= Aumont =

Aumont may refer to:

== People ==
- House of Aumont, a French noble house
- Jacques Aumont (born 1942), French academic and writer
- Jean-Pierre Aumont (1911–2001), French actor
- Michel Aumont (1936–2019), French actor
- Phillippe Aumont (born 1989), Canadian baseball player
- Tina Aumont (1946–2006), French-American actress

== Places ==
=== France ===
- Aumont, Jura
- Aumont, Somme
- Aumont-Aubrac, Lozère
- Aumont-en-Halatte, Oise
- Isle-Aumont, Aube
- Villequier-Aumont, Aisne

=== Switzerland ===
- Aumont, Fribourg, a former municipality of the Canton of Fribourg
