= Louis Marie Victor d'Aumont, 2nd Duke of Aumont =

Louis Marie Victor d'Aumont
- 2nd Duke of Aumont
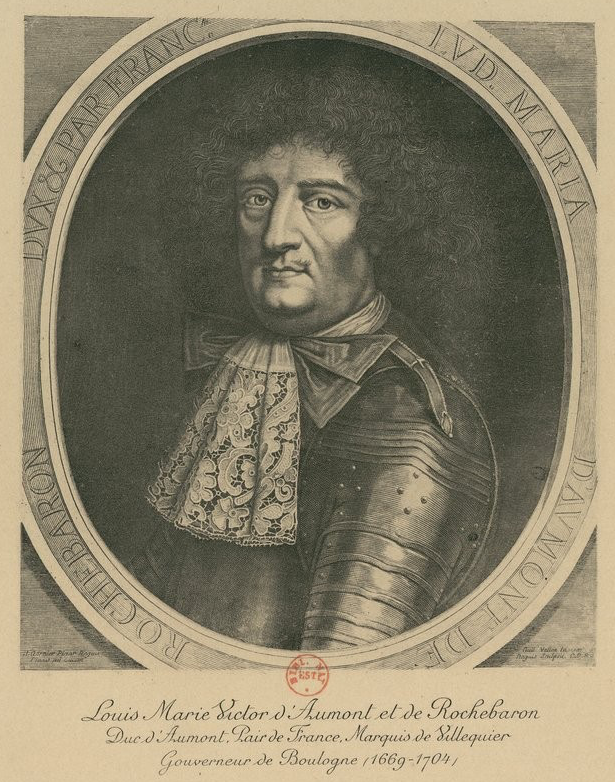
- Full name: Louis Marie Victor d'Aumont
- Born: 9 December 1632; Paris, France
- Died: 19 March 1704 (aged 71); Paris, France
- Spouses: Madeleine Le Tellier (21 November 1660); Françoise Angélique de La Mothe-Houdancourt
- Issue: Louis, 3rd Duke of Aumont
- Father: Antoine d'Aumont, 1st Duke of Aumont
- Mother: Catherine Scarron

Louis Marie Victor d'Aumont, 2nd Duke of Aumont (1632–1704) was a French Army officer and courtier who served Louis XIV in various capacities, including Premier Gentilhomme de la Chambre du Roi and as Governor of Paris.

In 1666, he assumed by Royal Licence the name de Villequier, and was styled marquis de Villequier until he succeeded to the dukedom of Aumont upon the death of his father Marshal Antoine d'Aumont, 1st Duke of Aumont in 1669.

He first married, on 21 November 1660, Madeleine Fare, daughter of Michel Le Tellier, marquis de Barbezieux, by whom he had five children, including

- Louis d'Aumont (1667–1723), the 3rd Duke (who married Olympe, daughter of Antoine de Brouilly, marquis de Piennes) and was French Ambassador to London;

He married a second time to Françoise Angélique de la Mothe Houdancourt, daughter of Philippe de La Mothe-Houdancourt and Louise de Prie.
Other descendants include the Grimaldis Princes of Monaco, via Hereditary Princess Louise of Monaco née d'Aumont, a great-granddaughter.

== See also ==
- Aumont family
- Villequier-Aumont
