= House of Aumont =

Family arms of the House of d'Aumont

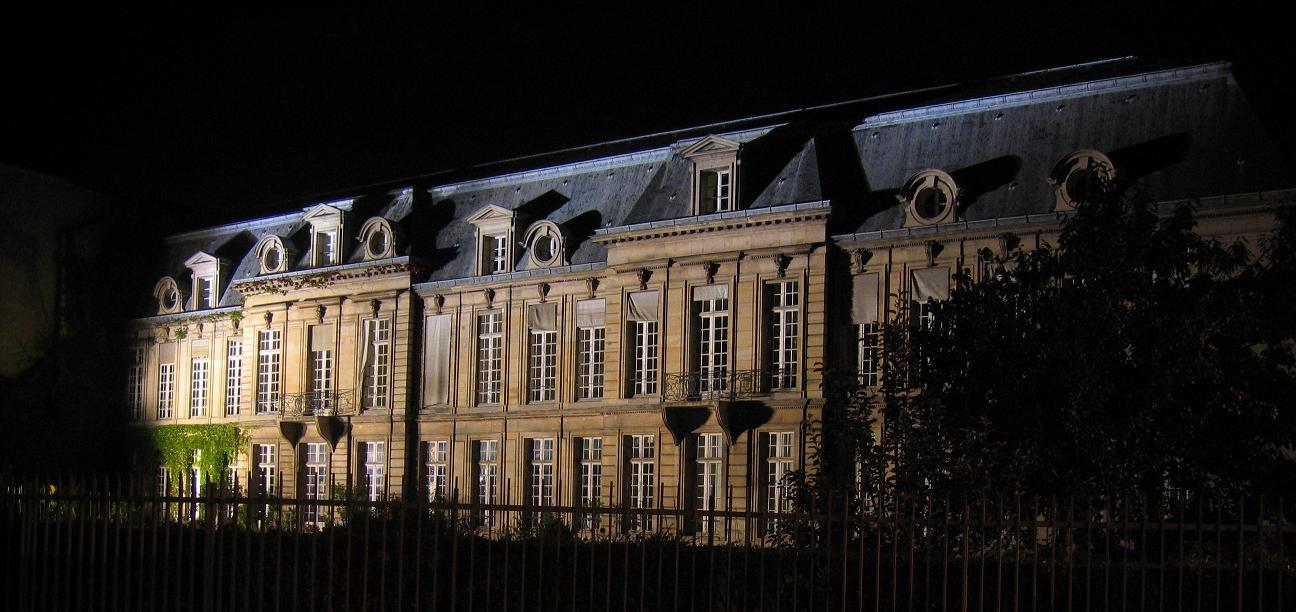
Hôtel d'Aumont, rue de Jouy, Paris

The House of Aumont is an ancient French noble house which takes its name from Aumont, a small commune in the department of the Somme. The dukedom of Aumont in the peerage of France was created in 1665 for Antoine d'Aumont de Rochebaron (1601–1669), Marquis of Isles. For over two centuries, the Dukes of Aumont held the position of First Gentleman of the Bedchamber to the king (Premier gentilhomme de la chambre du Roi).

The d'Aumont family became extinct in 1888 with Louis Marie Joseph d'Aumont, last duke of Aumont, who died single and without children.

== History ==
The d'Aumont family has a proven lineage dating back to Jean, sire d'Aumont, living in 1248.

Already powerful by the 14th century, during the Hundred Years' War the Aumonts served as military commanders to the French kings. Towards the end of that century, the family changed sides to the Dukes of Burgundy, but transferred its loyalties back to the Kings of France after the death of Charles the Bold in 1477.

Jean V d'Aumont, a Lieutenant-General in the French Army and Governor of Burgundy, was a key player under Louis XII and Francis I.

Jean VI d'Aumont (1552–1595) a Marshal of France and appointed an inaugural Knight of the Holy Spirit in 1578, fought against the Huguenots under the last of the Valois kings; he was among the first to recognize Henry IV, and was appointed Governor of Champagne and of Brittany, where he faced battles against the Catholic League. He died at the Château de Comper fighting Philippe Emmanuel, Duke of Mercœur, the League's leader. His grandson Antoine d'Aumont de Rochebaron (1601––1669) was a Marshal of France (1651), Governor of Paris (1662), and first Duke of Aumont. He was Marquis of Villequier, Isle, Nolay and Chappes, as well as Baron of Estrabonnes, before being created Duke of Aumont and a Peer of France in 1665. He had played an important role in the Battle of Rethel in December 1650.

The family has also held positions of ecclesiastic notability. Roger D'Aumont (1645–1651) was anointed Bishop of Avranche in the Catholic Diocese of Coutances, which includes the renowned abbey of Mont-Saint-Michel.

== Dukes of Aumont ==
- Louis-Marie-Victor d'Aumont (1632–1704), 2nd Duke of Aumont (previously Marquis of Chappes and Villequier), was a royal courtier under Louis XIV, who married on 21 November 1660 Madeleine, daughter of Michel le Tellier, marquis de Barbezieux (1603–1685).
- Louis d'Aumont (pl) (1667–1723), 3rd Duke of Aumont (Marquis of Villequier until 1704), was a politician and French Ambassador to London, who married Olympe, daughter of Antoine de Brouilly, marquis de Piennes.
- Louis-Marie d'Aumont de Rochebaron (1691–1723), 4th Duke of Aumont (known as Marquis of Villequier).
- Louis-Marie-Augustin d'Aumont (1709–1782), 5th Duke of Aumont, was a royal courtier and a celebrated collector of works of art. His collection included several pieces by noted painter Aglaé Cadet.
- Louis-Marie-Guy d'Aumont de Rochebaron (1732-1799), 6th Duke of Aumont, and marquis de Villequier et de Piennes, duc de Mazarin, later duc de Piennes, as well as baron de Chappes. His daughter Louise married Honoré IV, Prince of Monaco.
- Alexandre d'Aumont (1736-1814), 7th Duke of Aumont, devoted to Louis XVI, helped him escape from his prison during the Revolution in the misguided flight to Varennes.
- Louis-Marie-Celeste d'Aumont (1762–1831), 8th Duke of Aumont (from 1814), was also Duke of Piennes, etc. He emigrated during the Revolution and served in the army of the royalists, as also in the Swedish army. During the Hundred Days of Napoleon he effected a descent upon Normandy in the Bourbon interest, succeeding in the capture of Bayeux and Caen. Following his ancestors, he became Premier Gentilhomme of the Bedchamber to Louis XVIII, after the Restauration.
- Adolphe-Henri-Aimery d'Aumont (1785–1849), 9th Duke of Aumont (also Marquis of Villequier, etc.).
- Louis-Marie-Joseph d'Aumont (1809–1888), 10th Duke of Aumont (also Marquis of Villequier, etc.).

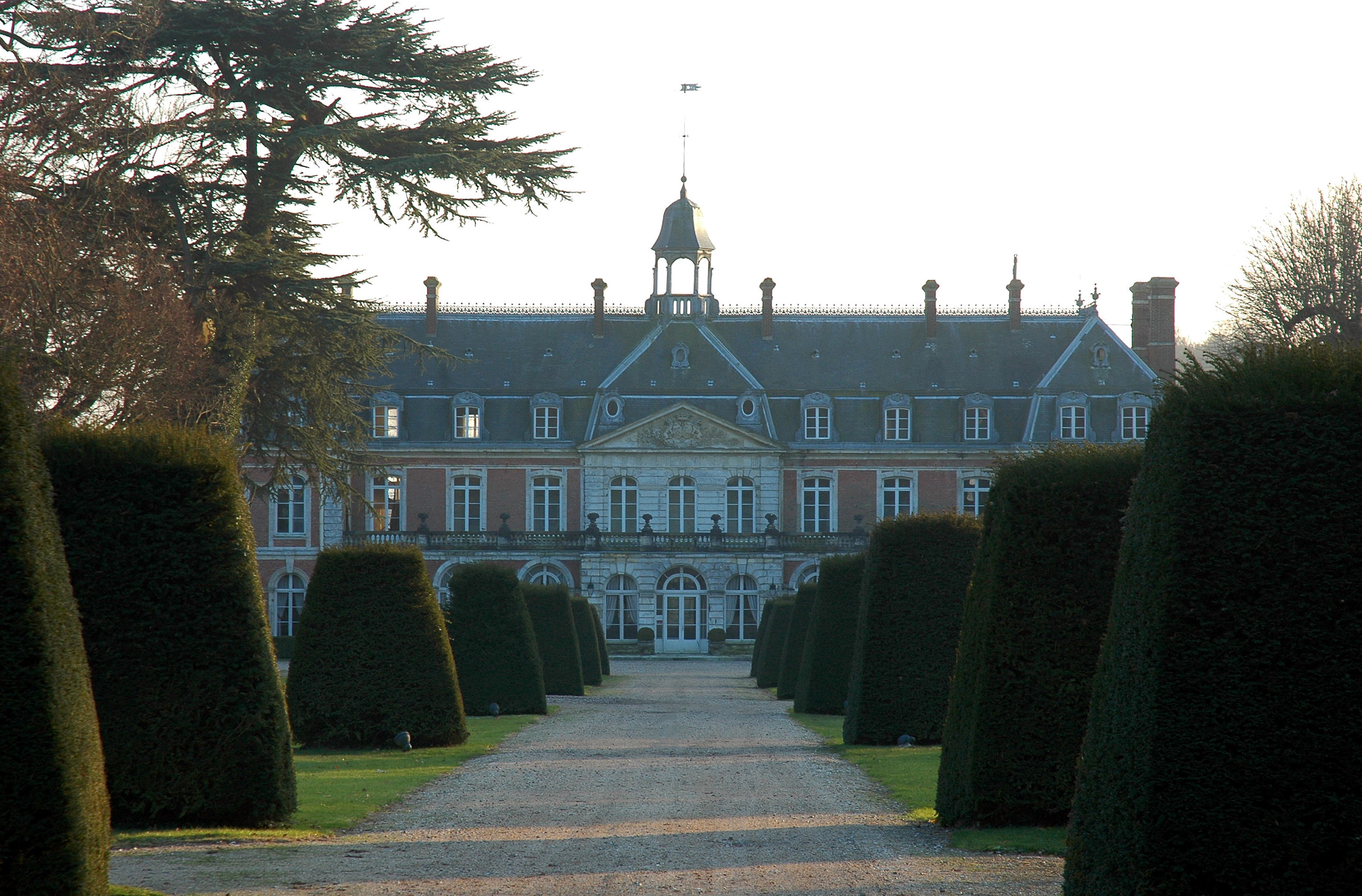
Château Villequier

== Armorial ==
Figure
Nom et blasonnement
Maison d'Aumont

D'argent, au chevron de gueules, accompagné de sept merlettes du même (2, 2, 1 et 2).
