= Antoine d'Aumont, 1st Duke of Aumont =

17th century French nobleman

The Marshal-Duke of Aumont
- 1st Duke of Aumont
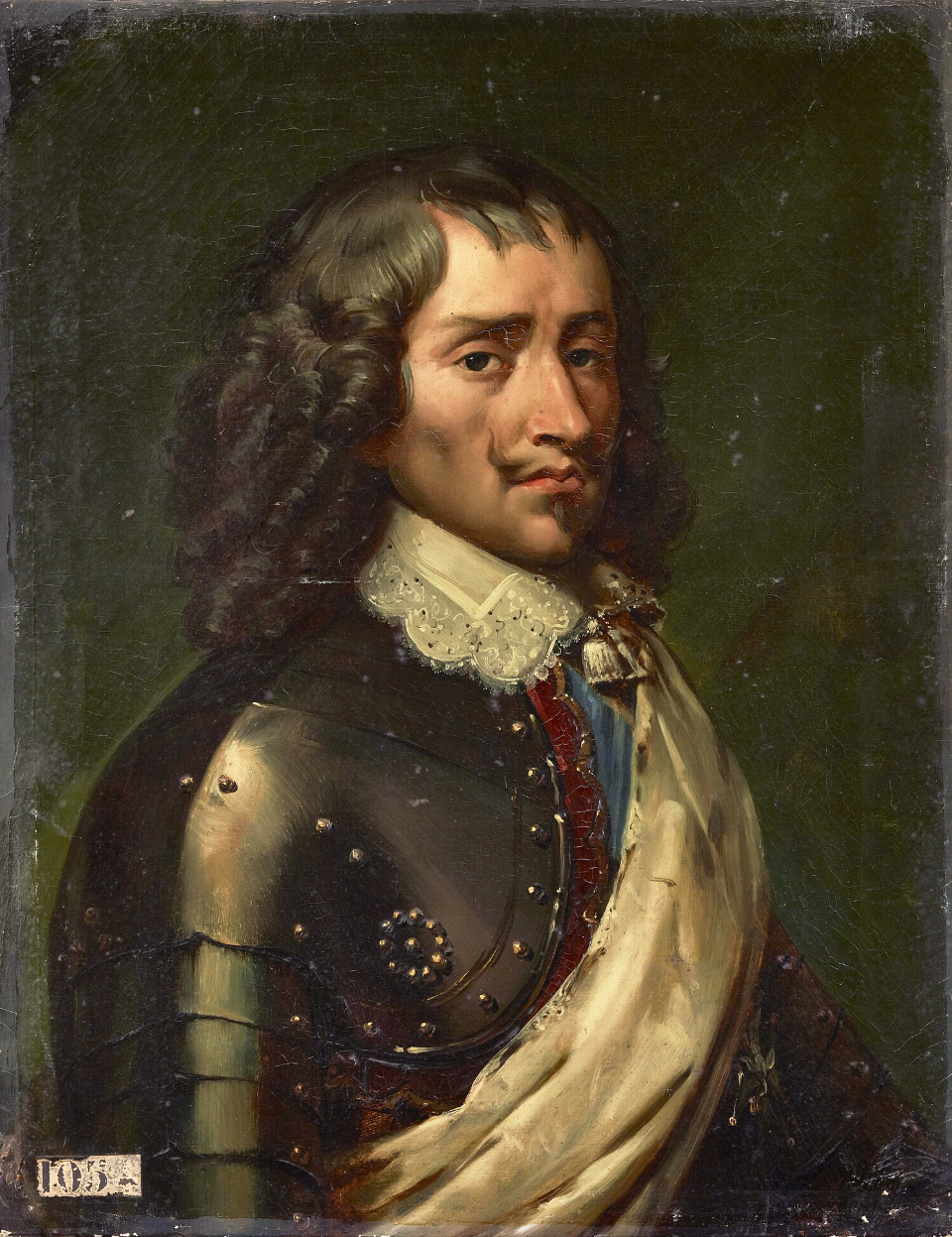
- Full name: Antoine d'Aumont
- Born: 1601; Paris, France
- Died: 1 January 1669 (aged 68); Paris, France
- Spouse: Catherine Scarron (March 1629)
- Issue: Louis Marie Victor, 2nd Duke of Aumont; Charles, Abbot of the Abbey of Saint-Pierre d'Uzerches; Anne Élisabeth, Countess of Broglio; Catherine Matie, Abbess of the Abbey of Saint-Julien du Pré
- Father: Jacques d'Aumont, Seigneur of Estrabonne
- Mother: Charlotte de Villequier

Antoine d'Aumont, 1st Duke of Aumont (1601 - 1 January 1669) was a French nobleman who was created the 1st Duke of Aumont in 1665 by King Louis XIV who had already created him a Marshal of France in 1651. His dukedom went extinct in 1888 after the death of the 10th Duke of Aumont Louis Marie Joseph d'Aumont. The Duke commissioned the construction and exstention of what became the Hôtel d'Aumont which was painted by Charles Le Brun and gardens designed by André Le Nôtre and in 1938, was purchased by the City of Paris, and restored and classified as a monument historique. Since 1959 the tribunal administratif of Paris has been housed in it. A radical restoration of the decayed framework was completed in 1964.

== Background ==
He was the second son of de Jacques d'Aumont and his wife the heiress Charlotte de Villequier. Antoine was a grandson of the celebrated Marshal of France Jean d'Aumont, Count of Châteauroux and baron of Estrabonne. Raised at the court of Henry IV of France, Antoine was an enfant d'honneur of the future King Louis XIII.

== Marriage ==
In March 1629, he married Catherine Scaron, niece of Paul Scarron.

== Children ==
1. Louis Marie Victor d'Aumont, 2nd Duke of Aumont (1632 - 1704) married Madeleine Le Tellier.
2. Charles d'Aumont, Abbot of the Abbey of Saint-Pierre d'Uzerches, Longuilliers, (?-1695)
3. Élisabeth d'Aumont married Charles Count of Broglio.
4. Catherine Marie d'Aumont, Abbess o the Abbey of Saint-Julien du Pré au Mans.

== Honours ==
- 5 January 1651: Created a Marshal of France.
- 1665: created 1st Duke of Aumont and a Peer of France.
- 14 May 1633: created a Knight of the Order of the Holy Spirit.

== Arms ==
- Français : Écartelé : 1, d'argent, au chevron de gueules, accompagné de 7 merlettes du même (4 et 3). (d'Aumont); 2, de gueules, à la croix fleurdelisée d'or, cantonnée de douze billettes du même (de Villequier); 3, contre-écartelé, aux 1 et 4, de (Chabot); au 2, d'argent, au lion de gueules, armé, lampassé et couronné d'or, la queue fourchée et passée en sautoir (Luxembourg); au 3, de gueules, à l'étoile à seize rais d'argent (Baux). (Alias: Marquis de Mirebeau, comtes de Charny etc ... mêmes armes.); 4, fascé-nébulé d'argent et de gueules (de Rochechouart); sur-le-tout de gueules, au chef échiqueté d'argent et d'azur (de Rochebaron).
