= Intendant des finances =

Government official in Kingdom of France

The Intendants des finances were intendants or agents of France's financial administration under the Ancien Régime.

== History ==
The role of intendant des finances was created in 1552 as a 'commission' or committee, to manage the subsidies raised for the 'trip to Germany', though these commissaires were only known by that title from 1556 onwards. They formed a collegiate ministry of finances, but it was common for one among them to become preeminent or even sometimes be made surintendant des finances.

The number of intendants fluctuated significantly, from 3 to 6 in the mid 16th century, then 12 in the mid 17th century, before falling back to 3 in 1661. Each intendant was put in charge of a geographical département as well as (until 1661) specialist duties such as for roads and bridges or for directly imposed taxes.

In 1690, the intendants became officiers or office-holders, under the direction of the Controller-General of Finances, who held a titular commission that could be revoked at any time (unlike the 'offices' of the intendants, who could ensure continuity in the financial administration thanks to the stability of their posts). The Controller-General and intendants were suppressed under the polysynody but revived in 1722. In 1777 they were again suppressed and their duties transferred to the maîtres des requêtes, who in 1787 received the commissions of the intendants des finances. It was briefly revived as the title for the French finance minister for the Dutch departments under the First French Empire, being held in that form by Alexander Gogel.

== Organization ==
The intendants des finances were only subsidiary by law to the Conseil privé, but they were not very diligent. Two of them sat on the Conseil royal des finances. Nearly all of them ended up being made conseillers d'État.

They benefitted from a wide autonomy in exercising their powers in their own départements, directly answering to the chancellor of France, the secrétaires d'État and the provincial intendants. The intendants des finances ended up informally gathering to prepare dossiers to present to the Conseil royal des finances, which resulted in its becoming a de facto substitute for that Conseil.

The intendants des finances and Controller-General were generally chosen from among the maîtres des requêtes. This origin, allied to the stability of the intendants des finances and the instability of the Controller-General, tended to blur the hierarchy that in principle placed the Controller-General above the intendants. However, even if the rank of the intendant des finances became almost equivalent to that of a secretary of state, they did not have the privilege (reserved for the Controller-General) of working in particular with the king. The intendants des finances nevertheless continued to assert their importance and rank nevertheless right up to the reign of Louis XV.

Each intendant des finances headed a département with a coherent assembly of duties:

- impositions
- bridges and roads
- forests and royal domains

== Holders ==
- André Guillard (1552–1557)
- Marc de la Rue de La Couste (1552–1556)
- Jean Leconte de Voisinlieu (1552–1573)
- Claude Burgensis du Coguier (1552–1568)
- Jean de Saint-Marcel d'Avençon (1556–1559)
- Jacques Hurault de Vibraye (1557–1567)
- Antoine Bohier de Chesnaye (1559–1560)
- Jean Ferey de Durescu (1559–1567) and (1568–1573)
- Étienne Lalemant de Vouzay (1559–1560)
- Charles Leprévot de Grandville (1560–1568) (†)
- Nicolas de Verdun (1567–1569) (†)
- Pierre Brulard (1567–1569)
- Pierre Clausse de Marchaumont (1568–1577)
- Pierre Sarred (1569–1570)
- Guillaume de Marillac (1569–1573) (†)
- Jean Camus de Saint-Bonnet (1570–1579)
- Jean Chastelier du Milieu (1573–1580) en surnombre
- Claude Marcel (1573–1590) (†)
- Olivier Le Fèvre d'Ormesson (1573–1578)
- Benoît Myllon d'Olainville (1573–1584)
- Robert Miron de Chenailles (1576–1588) en surnombre
- Étienne de Bray (1579–1580)
- Étienne Hennequin de Cury (1579–1580)
- Adrien Pétremol de Rosières (1587–1592) (†)
- Michel Sublet d'Heudicourt (1589–1599) (†)
- Charles de Saldaigne d'Incarville (1589–1596)
- Jacques Vallée des Barreaulx (1589–1596)
- Pierre Mollan (1589)
- Jacques Lallier du Pin (1590–1592) (†)
- Mathieu Marcel (1591–1596)
- Octavien Dony d'Attichy (1592–1596), (1597–1598) and (1610–1614)
- Gilbert Gombaud (1592) (†)
- Louis Guibert de Bucy (1592–1596)
- Louis Picot de Santeny (1593–1596) and (1599)
- Jean de Vienne (1594–1596) and (1599)
- Raymond de Viçose (1594–1596)
- Pierre de Prugue (1594–1596);
- Gilles de Maupeou (1600–1608) and (1611–1621)
- Isaac Arnauld (1605–1617) (†)
- Louis Dollé (1614–1616) (†)
- Charles Duret de Chevry (1615–1633)
- Pierre de Castille (1616–1623) and (1626–1629)
- Pierre Baudouyn de Soupir et des Portes (1617–1623) and (1624–1626) (†)
- Guichard Déageant (1617–1621)
- Claude Malier du Houssay (1621–1641) (†)
- Thomas Le Clerc (1621–1624) (†)
- Charles Le Beauclerc (1623–1624)
- Louis Tronson (1624–1626)
- François Sublet de Noyers (1629–1636)
- Michel Particelli d'Émery (1631–1643)
- Claude Cornuel (1634–1638) (†)
- Jacques Tubeuf (1638–1650)
- Séraphin de Mauroy (1640–1658)
- Étienne Le Charron (1643–1649) (†)
- Pierre Malier de Montharville (1643–1650)
- Jacques Le Tillier (1649–1662)
- Jacques Bordier (1649–1660) (†)
- Guillaume de Bordeaux (1649–1660) (†)
- Étienne Foullé (1649–1658)
- Denis Marin (1650–1678) (†)
- Barthélemy Hervart (1650–1657)
- Pierre Gargam (1650–1657) (†)
- Jacques Paget (1654–1658)
- Guillaume Brisacier (1654–1658)
- Claude Housset (1654–1658)
- Claude de Boylesve (1654–1658)
- Jacques Amproux de Lorme (1657–1658)
- Bernard de Fieubet de Caumont (1657–1658)
- Jean-Baptiste Colbert (1661–1666)
- Vincent Hotman de Fontenay (1666–1683) (†)
- Nicolas Desmarets (1678–1684)
- Michel Le Peletier de Souzy (1684–1700)
- François Le Tonnelier de Breteuil (1684–1701)
- Louis Phélypeaux de Pontchartrain (1687–1689)
- Nicolas Heudebert du Buisson (1690–1714)
- Michel Chamillart (1690–1699)
- Louis Urbain Lefebvre de Caumartin (1690–1715)
- Joseph Jean-Baptiste Fleuriau d'Armenonville (1690–1708)
- Armand Roland Bignon de Blanzy (1699–1709)
- Michel Robert Le Peletier des Forts (1700–1715)
- François Guyet de la Faye (1703–1715)
- Alexandre Le Rebours (1704–1715)
- Jacques Poulletier (1708–1715)
- Charles Henri de Malon, seigneur de Bercy (1709–1715)
- Louis Fagon (1714–1715) and (1722–1744) (†)
- Henri François Lefèvre d'Ormesson (1722–1756) (†)
- Jean-Baptiste de Gaumont (1722–1735)
- Charles Gaspard Dodun (1722)
- Gabriel Taschereau de Baudry (1722–1755) (†)
- Félix Claude Le Peletier de La Houssaye de Signy (1722–1748)
- Louis Michel Berthelot de Monchesne (1725–1726)
- Jean-Jacques Amelot de Chaillou (1726–1737)
- Daniel Trudaine (1735–1769)
- Jean-Louis Henri Orry de Fulvy (1737–1751) (†)
- Jean de Boullongne (1744–1757)
- Jean Dominique Barberie de Courteilles (1748–1767)
- Jacques Bernard Chauvelin de Beauséjour (1751–1766)
- François Marie Peyrenc de Moras (1755)
- Jean-Louis Moreau de Beaumont (1756–1777)
- François Marie Lefèvre d'Ormesson (1756–1775) (†)
- Jean-Nicolas de Boullongne (1757–1771)
- André François Langlois (1763–1771)
- Charles Robert Boutin (1766–1771) and (1774–1777)
- Augustin Henri Cochin (1767–1771)
- Jean-Charles Philibert Trudaine de Montigny (1769–1777)
- Joseph François Foullon (1771–1774)
- Antoine-Jean Amelot de Chaillou (1774–1776)
- Henri François II Lefèvre d'Ormesson (1775–1777)
- François Fargès (1776–1777)
- Gabriel Isaac Douet de La Boullay (1787)
- Antoine Louis Blondel (1787–1791)
- André Charles de Bonnaire de Forges (1787–1791)
- Antoine-Louis Chaumont de La Millière (1787–1791)
