= François Sublet de Noyers =

French statesman and diplomat

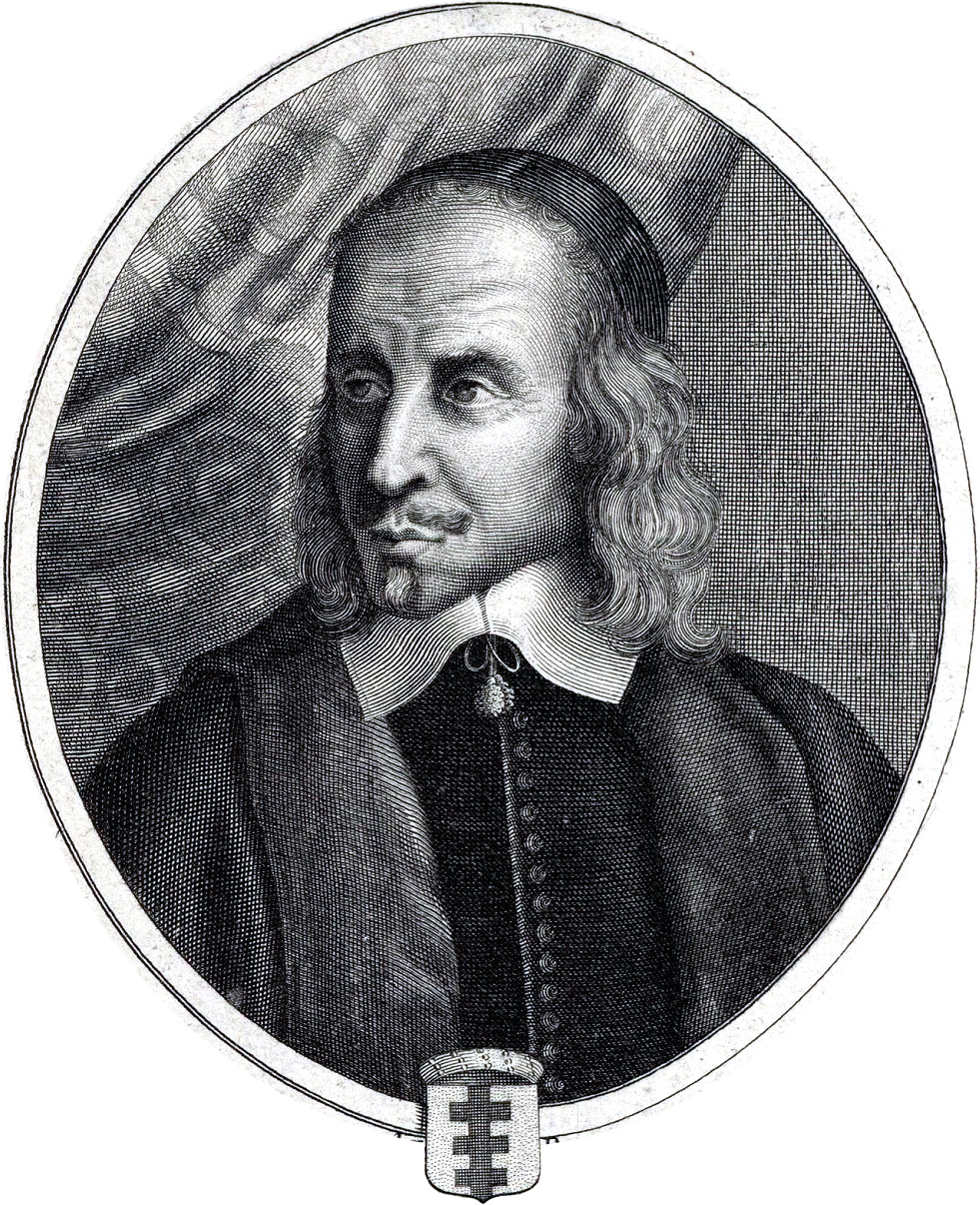
Portrait of François Sublet de Noyers by Pierre Daret

François Sublet de Noyers (1589 – 20 October 1645) was a French statesman and diplomat during the 17th Century. Closely associated with Cardinal de Richelieu, he derived his position and political weight from the Cardinal's consistent patronage, was a secretary of state to Louis XIII, and a member of his Conseil du Roi. He was a knowledgeable patron of the arts.

Sublet de Noyers held the posts of Intendant des finances, then of Secretary of State for War, reorganizing the army in Picardie and Champagne, an example of the developing tradition of professional administrators in the kingdom. He was superintendent of the Bâtiments du Roi, charged with overseeing all constructions undertaken on the part of the Crown, and a patron consequently of public art, but also a private patron.

== Career ==
He came from an aristocratic family with a history of service to the French monarchy and an unshakeable Catholic faith, that came to prominence at Blois with the sons of Jean Sublet, two of whom were ennobled towards the end of the reign of Charles IX. At the end of the 16th century the family found itself established in the Marais quarter of Paris and in Normandy, where the demesne of Noyers lay in the baillage of Gisors.

François Sublet de Noyers was the early protégé of his uncle, Jean Bochart, president of the parlement de Paris and surintendant des finances, who paved his nephew's way in the Conseil des finances. François was the effective head of the family upon the retirement of his father to the Carthusian monastery of Paris. In 1613 he married Isabelle Le Sueur, daughter of a maître des comptes, who brought him a solid dowry and further connections with the noblesse de robe.

Distant relations of the Bochart de Champigny family with Richelieu placed François in the Cardinal's orbit, under the high patronage of Queen Marie de' Medici and the prince de Condé. At the beginning of the 1630s Richelieu placed him in supervision of the armies of Champagne and Picardy in which post Sublet de Noyers distinguished himself in particular with the fortifications undertaken under his surveillance, and he gained useful field experience.

With the sudden death of his wife he entered upon an austere private life that his detractors attributed to his having taken secret vows in the Society of Jesus. Like others in Richelieu's immediate circle he did move in harmony with the Jesuits, as a member of the Confrérie des Messieurs de Paris. His funds financed the construction of the Jesuit novitiate in Paris.

At the time of his appointment as secretary of state for war to succeed Abel Servien, forced out by court intrigue, he was 47 years old. From 1640 Sublet de Noyers and his rival Léon Bouthillier, comte de Chavigny, secretary of state for foreign affairs, were the closest political collaborators with Louis XIII and Richelieu, between whom Sublet de Noyers transmitted confidential information, interpreting the one to the other. As the minister responsible for carrying on the all but constant state of war from 1636 to 1643, war with Spain, peasant revolts in the provinces, and the opening stages of the Fronde, Sublet de Noyers assumed a prominent position in the Conseil. The King, who considered him at first merely one of Richelieu's "lost souls", warmed to him by degrees, won over by his austere piety and his service to the party of the Dévots; eventually Louis entrusted him with even the low duties of evicting from court the Cardinal's enemies, like Cinq-Mars.

His extensive modernizing of the French army ranged to recruitment, provisioning, troop payments, lodging, the creation of military hospitals, put in place a reformed bureaucracy more directly dependent on royal will, but effected through a hierarchy of nepotism and patronage. He himself was constantly on the move, accompanying Richelieu and the King and visiting all the fronts of French involvement in the Thirty Years' War in turn.

Sublet de Noyers, who had rendered himself indispensable, was made superintendent of the king's architectural projects, the Bâtiments du Roi, in 1638. Here he employed the same systematized patronage, founded on kinship and acquaintance. His Fréart cousins, the brothers Fréart de Chambray and Fréart de Chanteloup, played determining roles in the choices that directed official patronage in the arts and architecture. The royal projects were essentially confined to restoration and interior embellishments and the royal château of Fontainebleau and the Palais du Louvre. The churches of Paris and urbanistic projects in the capital also required his attention. In retrospect, the single most important official gesture made on his part was his insistence from 1640 to 1641 that Nicolas Poussin return from Rome to Paris. His other concerns included establishing a royal printing-press.

Sublet de Noyers' recent biographer, Camille Lefauconnier, estimates that at the height of his career he enjoyed an income of approximately 50,000 livres tournois, from his official emoluments, from the rents on his properties in Normandy and in Paris, and the dowry of his late wife.

He divided his time among several residences, near the King at Fontainebleau, near the Cardinal at Rueil. In Paris his house was in rue Saint-Honoré, closer to his two masters than the old family accommodations in the Marais, which was beginning to lose its cachet. The house in rue Saint-Honoré was famed in its time for its sober elegance, which set him apart from his colleagues' more expansive and luxurious hôtels particuliers

In Normandy Sublet de Noyers abandoned by stages the château de Noyers constructed by his father to reside more and more during the 1640s at Dangu. This domaine was acquired in 1641 through an exchange forced upon the family of the duc de Montmorency, effected by his leverage as a creature of Richelieu. From a client of the Cardinal, he came to develop his own network of those who owed him favours, those whom he protected, those whose army commissions they owed to him, Above all he gained a reputation as a patron of the arts, gathering round him painters, sculptors and architects, the Intelligents, whose broad concerns were to impose a classical order upon French arts.

He was at the same time the protector of the religious establishment of France, headed by the Jesuits, with whose General at Rome he maintained a correspondence.

== His disgrace ==
At the apogee of his power in 1642, Richelieu died. The King was unable to resist the cabal of Sublet de Noyers detractors, led by Chavigny and Cardinal Mazarin. He requested leave from court and departed precipitously in April 1643. The death of Louis XIII soon afterwards gave him some hopes of returning, with the favour of Anne of Austria, for whose account he continued his place at the Bâtiments, where he was disappointed in his expectations of reimbursement. He retired a second time to Dangu where he died, 20 October 1645, surrounded by friends and relations.

In the new reign, his reputation was eclipsed by the careers of Louvois and of Jean Baptiste Colbert. The Montmorency instituted proceeding to have Dangu returned to them, and in 1663 they were successful before the Parlement.

His branch of the Sublet family came to an abrupt end with the death in 1673 of his only son Guillaume, unmarried. His daughter Madeleine became a Carmelite nun. The cadet branch of the family, the Sublet d’Heudicourt made names for themselves in the wars of Louis XIV.

== Notes ==
Political offices
Preceded by Louis Tronson	Intendant des finances 1628–1636	Succeeded by Michel Particelli d'Émery
Preceded by Abel Servien	Secretary of State for War; 1636–1643	Succeeded by Michel Le Tellier
Preceded by Henri de Fourcy de Corbinière	Superintendent of the Bâtiments du Roi; 1638–1645	Succeeded by Jules Mazarin
