= Louis Urbain Lefebvre de Caumartin =

French nobleman

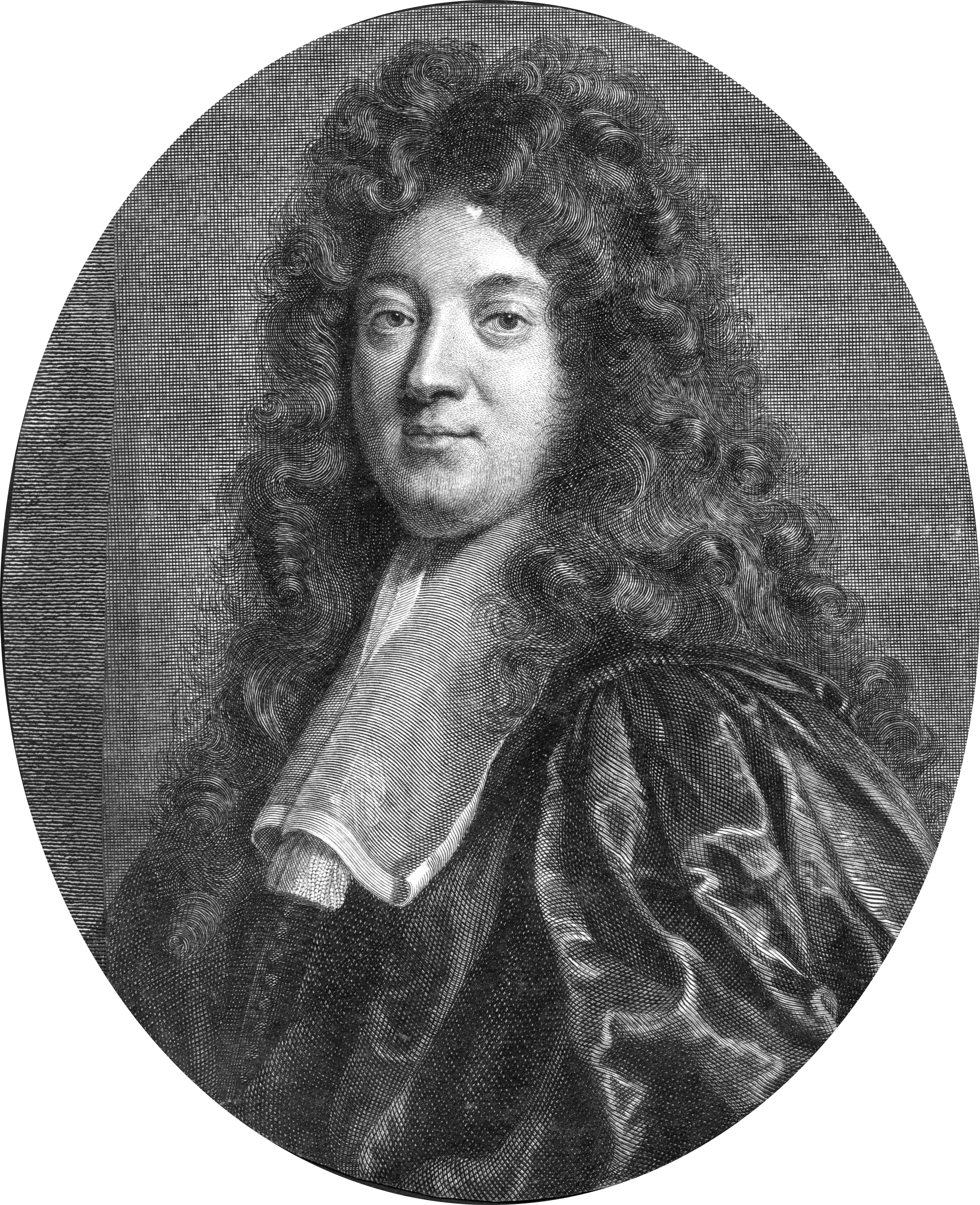
Louis Urbain Lefebvre de Caumartin.

Louis Urbain Lefebvre de Caumartin (1653–1720) was a French nobleman. He held the offices of member of the Parlement of Paris, and later Intendant des finances and counsellor of state.
