= Statue of Alexander VII (Bernini) =

Sculpture by Gian Lorenzo Bernini

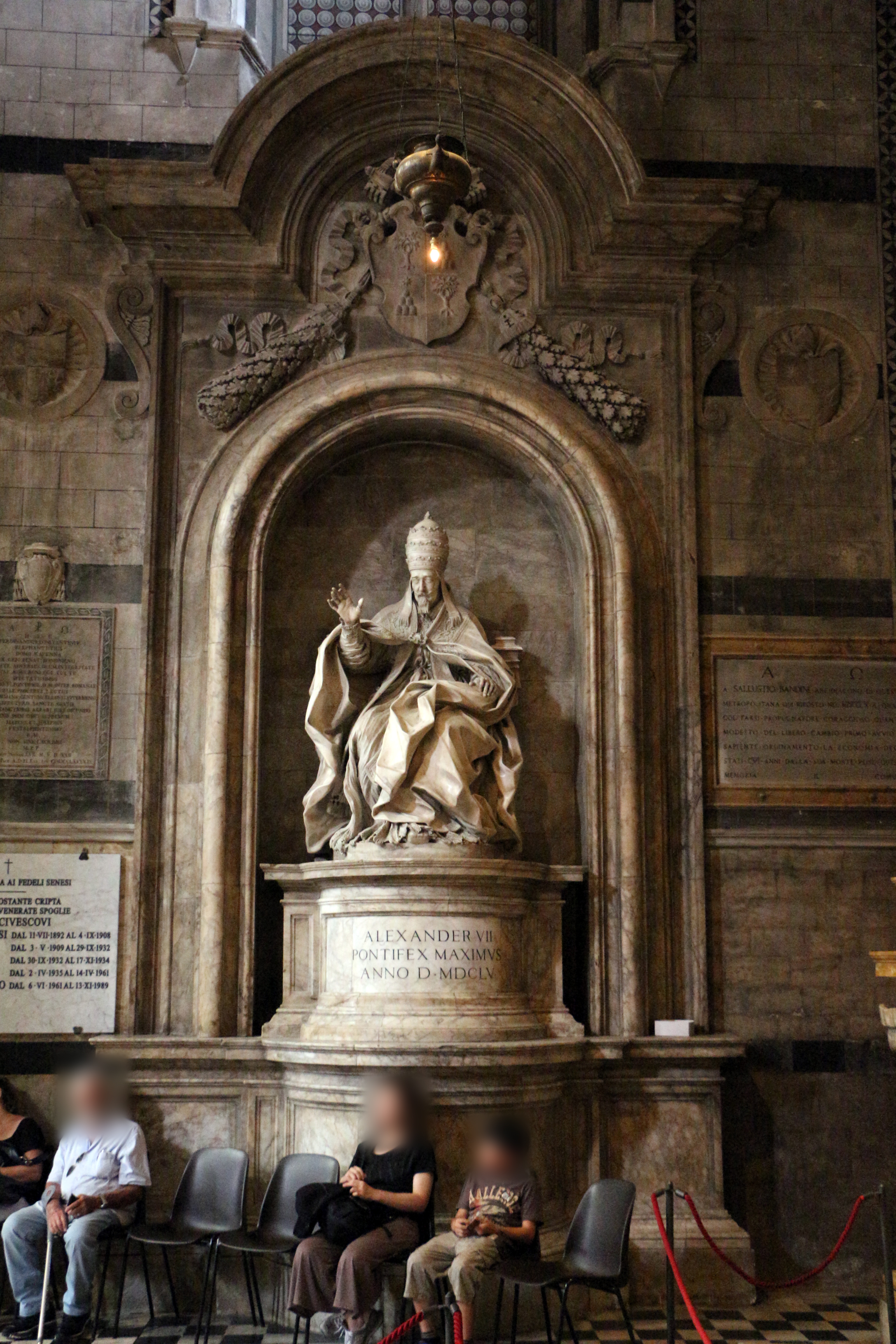
- Artist: Gian Lorenzo Bernini
- Year: 1661-63
- Type: Marble Sculpture
- Location: Siena Cathedral, Siena
- Preceded by: Saints Jerome and Mary Magdalen (Bernini)
- Followed by: Bust of Louis XIV (Bernini)

The Statue of Alexander VII is a large sculpture of Fabio Chigi (Pope Alexander VII), designed by the Italian artist Gian Lorenzo Bernini and executed by a member of his studio, probably Antonio Raggi. It sits in its original location of the Cathedral of Siena. It was begun in 1661 and completed in 1663.

== See also ==
- List of works by Gian Lorenzo Bernini

== Links ==
Image of statue from Courtauld Institute of Art
