= Jean-Baptiste Weyler =

French miniaturist (1747–1791)

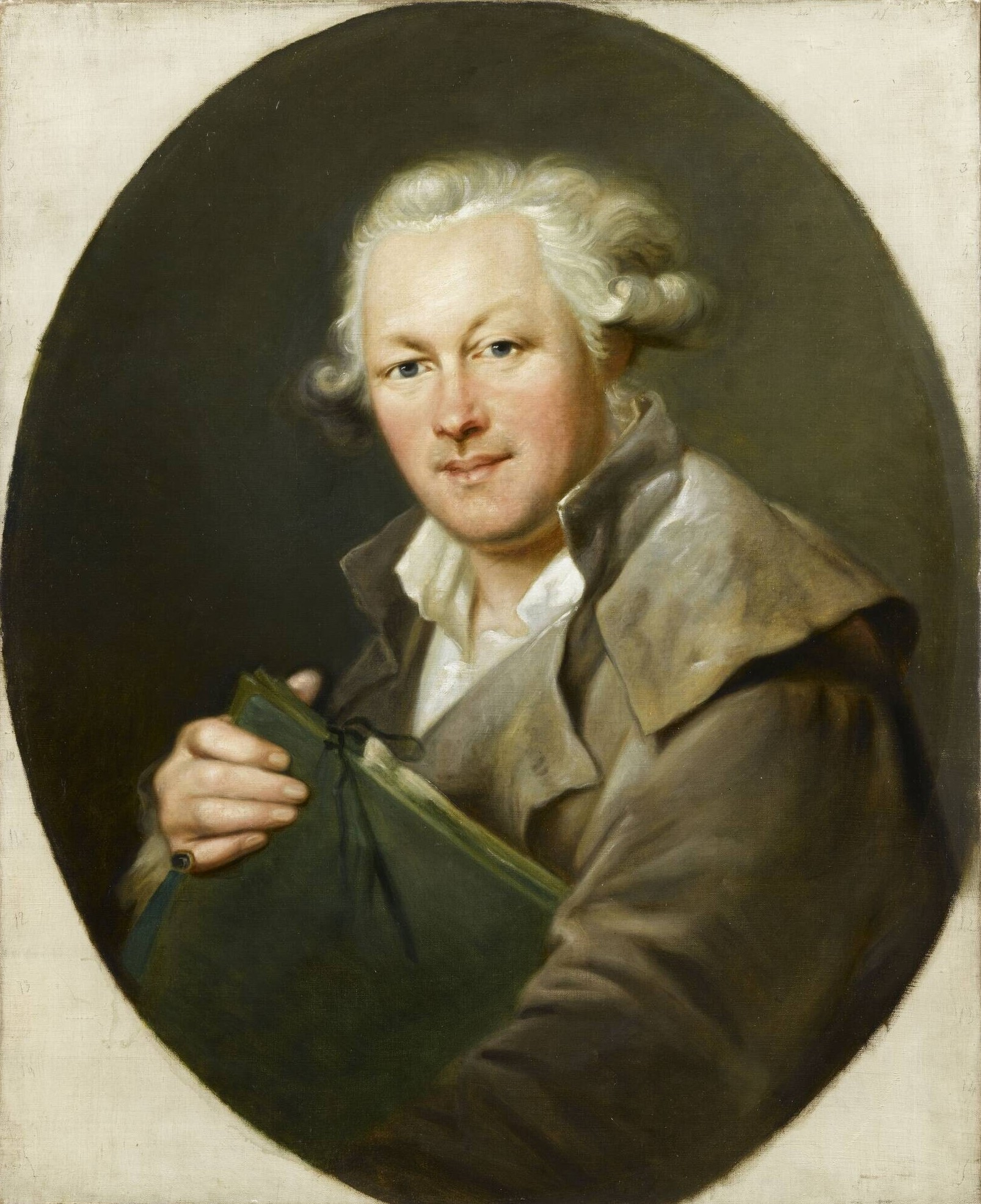
Portrait by Jules Augé after Alexander Roslin

Jean-Baptiste Weyler (3 January 1747 – 25 July 1791) was a French miniaturist.

One of his pupils is thought to have been Aglaé Cadet, mother of Weyler's wife Henriette-Thérèse Cadet
