= Louis Boucherat, Count of Compans =

The Count of Compans
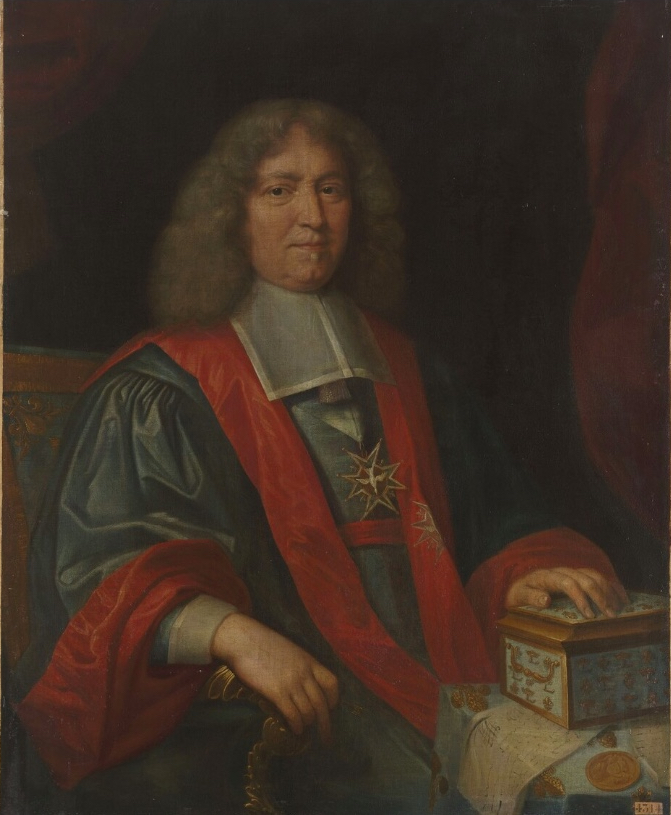

Chancellor of France
- In office 1685–1699
- Preceded by: The Marquis of Barbezieux
- Succeeded by: The Marquis of Phélypeaux

Personal details
- Born: 26 August 1616 Paris
- Died: 2 September 1699 (aged 83) Paris

Louis Boucherat, count de Compans (26 August 1616 – 2 September 1699) was Chancellor of France from 1685 until his death.

== Biography ==
From a family in Troyes, Louis Boucherat was the son of Jean Boucherat, advisor to the King at the Councils of State and Privy and Master of the Courts of Accounts. Boucherat married first Françoise Marchant, and then Anne-Françoise de Loménie.

Boucherat began his career as an advisor to the Parlement of Paris in 1641 and then as Master of requests in 1643.

He served under Louis XIV as Intendant of Guyenne, Languedoc, Picardy, and Champagne and as a State Councilor in 1662. Boucherat also served as Commissioner of Languedoc and Brittany.

In 1681, Boucherat became an advisor to the Royal Council of Finance, and was appointed Chancellor of France upon the death of Michel le Tellier in 1685, a position he held until his death. He had to implement the Edict of Fontainebleau which his predecessor had just signed before his death.
