= Bust of Louis XIV (Bernini) =

Sculpture by Gian Lorenzo Bernini

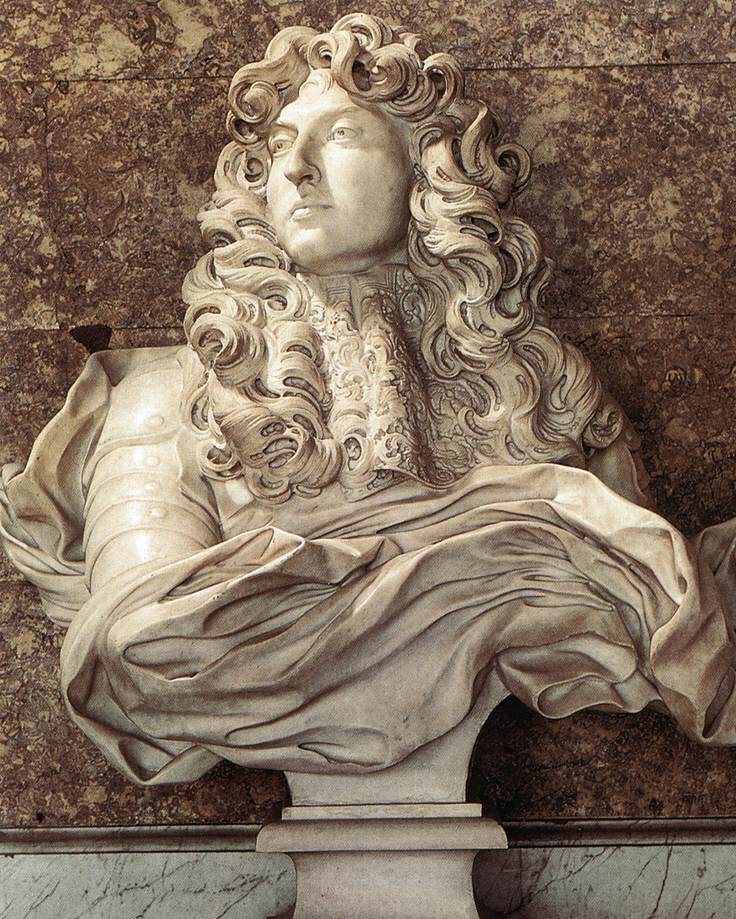
- Artist: Gian Lorenzo Bernini
- Year: 1665
- Catalogue: 70
- Type: Sculpture
- Medium: Marble
- Subject: Louis XIV
- Dimensions: 80 cm (31 in)
- Location: Palace of Versailles, Versailles; 48°48′18.000″N 2°7′16.284″E
- Preceded by: Statue of Alexander VII (Bernini)
- Followed by: Elephant and Obelisk

The Bust of Louis XIV is a marble portrait by the Italian artist Gian Lorenzo Bernini. It was created in the year 1665 during Bernini's visit to Paris. This sculptural portrait of Louis XIV has been called the "grandest piece of portraiture of the Baroque age". The bust is on display at the Versailles Palace, in the Salon de Diane in the King's Grand Apartment.

== Commissioning ==
Bernini had been invited to Paris as part of a larger diplomatic exchange between the Papacy and France. The ostensible reason for the visit was to create new designs for the Louvre Palace, but the young king Louis XIV had declared he also desired a portrait bust. Bernini's designs for the Louvre did not go down well and were not acted upon; indeed their failure to be accepted was a reflection of the general antagonism between the Italian Bernini and certain members within the French court. However, the portrait bust, which depended upon a more personal relationship between the king and the artist, was completed and largely considered a great success.

== Creation ==
The creation of the bust is incredibly well documented, thanks to efforts of the French diarist Paul Fréart de Chantelou, a steward at the court of Louis XIV, who befriended Bernini during his time in Paris.

The bust took just over three months to carve. According to Chantelou's diary the process of selecting suitable marble blocks took several days to accomplish. While searching for a suitable block of marble to create the bust there was some discussion with members of the court about whether or not Bernini would make a full body statue or a bust. Once potential blocks of marble had been selected, Bernini began by taking drawings (none of which survive) and small clay models of the king. However, it seems that once he had done this initial work, Bernini chose to work only during sittings with the king. His pupil, Giulio Cartari, began work on carving down the chosen block of marble (and would later do much of the drapery work), and then Bernini took over, taking forty days to complete the work. He had hoped to have twenty sittings with the king during the final carving process, but in fact there were thirteen of around one hour each. The bust is modeled heavily after an earlier bust that Bernini made almost a decade prior of Francesco d'Este, the duke of Modena, and other than the fact that Louis' cloak was slightly longer horizontally a person would not be able to tell that one was of higher nobility.

Bernini's son and biographer, Domenico Bernini, noted the artistic arguments of his father as to why the King agreed to sit for such a length of time, explaining that the artist preferred to work from Truth (i.e. real life) rather than rely on the unnecessary imaginative extras that would creep into working from sketches. Equally, Bernini wanted to see the king, as he did many of this other sitters, not remaining immobile, but sitting and talking in such as way that Bernini could capture all his characteristics. Such an approach, with Bernini wishing to capture the figure in physical and psychological motion, was a common element of Bernini's work: “mere resemblance is inadequate. One must express what goes on in the heads of heroes,” Bernini is recorded as saying. Bernini also observed the king in other locations - playing tennis, resting after lunch, or simply walking around court.

Filippo Baldinucci (biographer of artists/art historian) records numerous events that advertise Bernini's supposed influence on French culture, including one incident where Bernini's rearranged the King's hair to give greater exposure to the King's brow - the new style was apparently followed by all at the French court, and became known as the Bernini modification. Contemporary art historians are sceptical of this however; Jeanne Zarucchi claims that the alteration was deliberate, altering the shape of the King's head in an unflattering manner.

== Conception ==
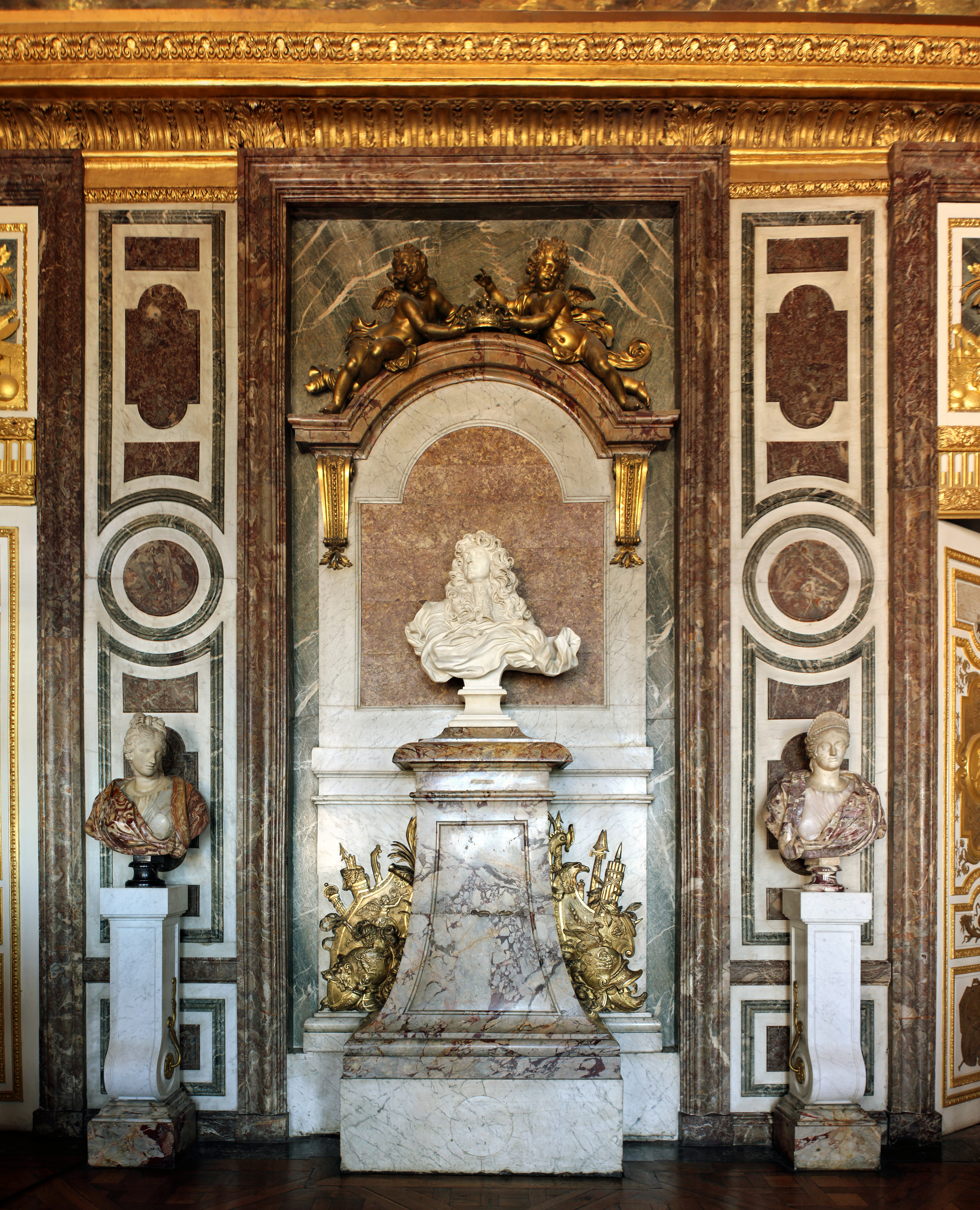
The bust, as displayed in the Salon de Diane

Sculpted late in his career, the bust's grand nature, with its dramatic drapery and regal nature can be seen as a continuation of the bust Bernini executed for Francesco I D’Este.

Despite not being an actual military commander, Bernini conceived of Louis in armour, drawing on notions of heroic kings such as Alexander the Great. Though a small man, Louis is figured as a stately character, fusing grandeur with a rich elegance of spirit. The drapery suggests the movement of wind, but also demonstrates the ability of the king to overcome such earthly distractions - he stares in to the distance, perhaps as if giving a military commands, turning his face against the direction the wind is blowing. Bernini may also have explored concept of Louis as the Sun King in the portrait, relating the king's hair to sunbeams and the drapery as passing clouds.

Yet the idealisation of the king as a great emperor was also grounded in reality. It was a feature of Bernini's sculpture that he could combine abstract notions such as grandeur and nobility with precise individual characteristics of the sitter. Bernini paid careful attention to and played with the hair, eyes, nose forehead, and the clothing of Louis making subtle adjustments that allowed Bernini to give the appearance of the individual sitter, being without it being a slavish copy or a lifeless abstraction.

To strengthen the military grandeur of the bust, Bernini designed a large globe to act as a pedestal for the bust, thus giving the appearance that the entire world was a platform for Louis's majesty. Bernini also intended such a pedestal to raise the overall height of the artwork, so that the artwork would sit above and be out of touch of the spectator. However, this was never completed and the bust was moved from its position in the Louvre palace to the Palace of Versailles in 1680s, where it still remains now.

== Immediate Reception ==
Despite the carping of French critics at the court of Louis XIV, the bust was immediately considered a success, as the number of reproductions testifies. A mould of the bust was made in 1666; by 1669 at least seven plaster casts had been created. An early bronze version was taken to Quebec, Canada but is now lost. The only other early copy in bronze is in the National Gallery of Art in Washington.

== See also ==
- List of works by Gian Lorenzo Bernini
