= Chair of Saint Peter =

Relic in St. Peter's Basilica in Vatican City

- Cathedra Petri (Latin)
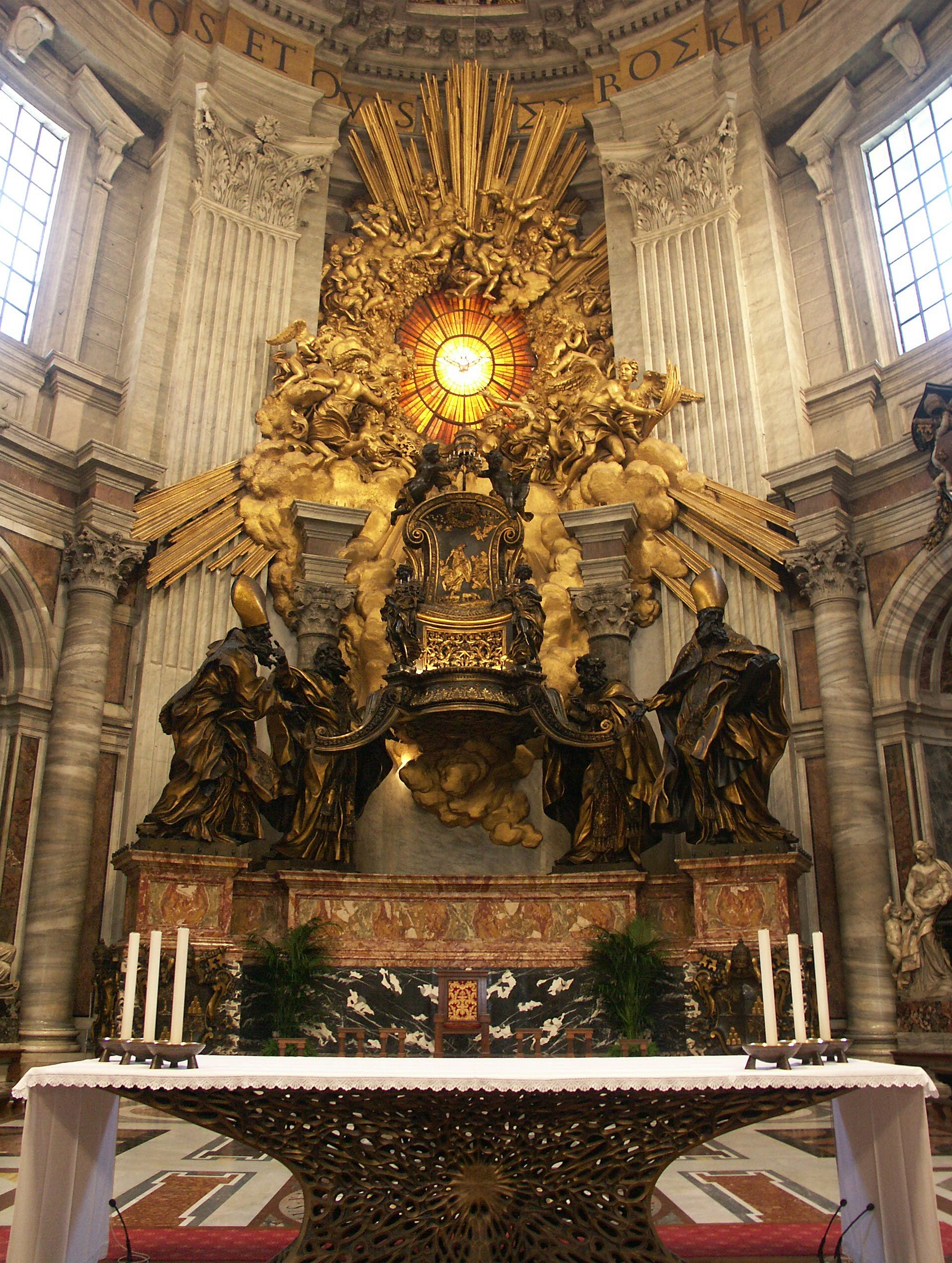
- Artist: Gian Lorenzo Bernini
- Year: 1657–1666
- Catalogue: 61
- Type: Sculpture
- Medium: Gilt bronze
- Location: St. Peter's Basilica, Vatican City; 41°54′8″N 12°27′12″E
- Preceded by: Habakkuk and the Angel (Bernini)
- Followed by: Saints Jerome and Mary Magdalen (Bernini)

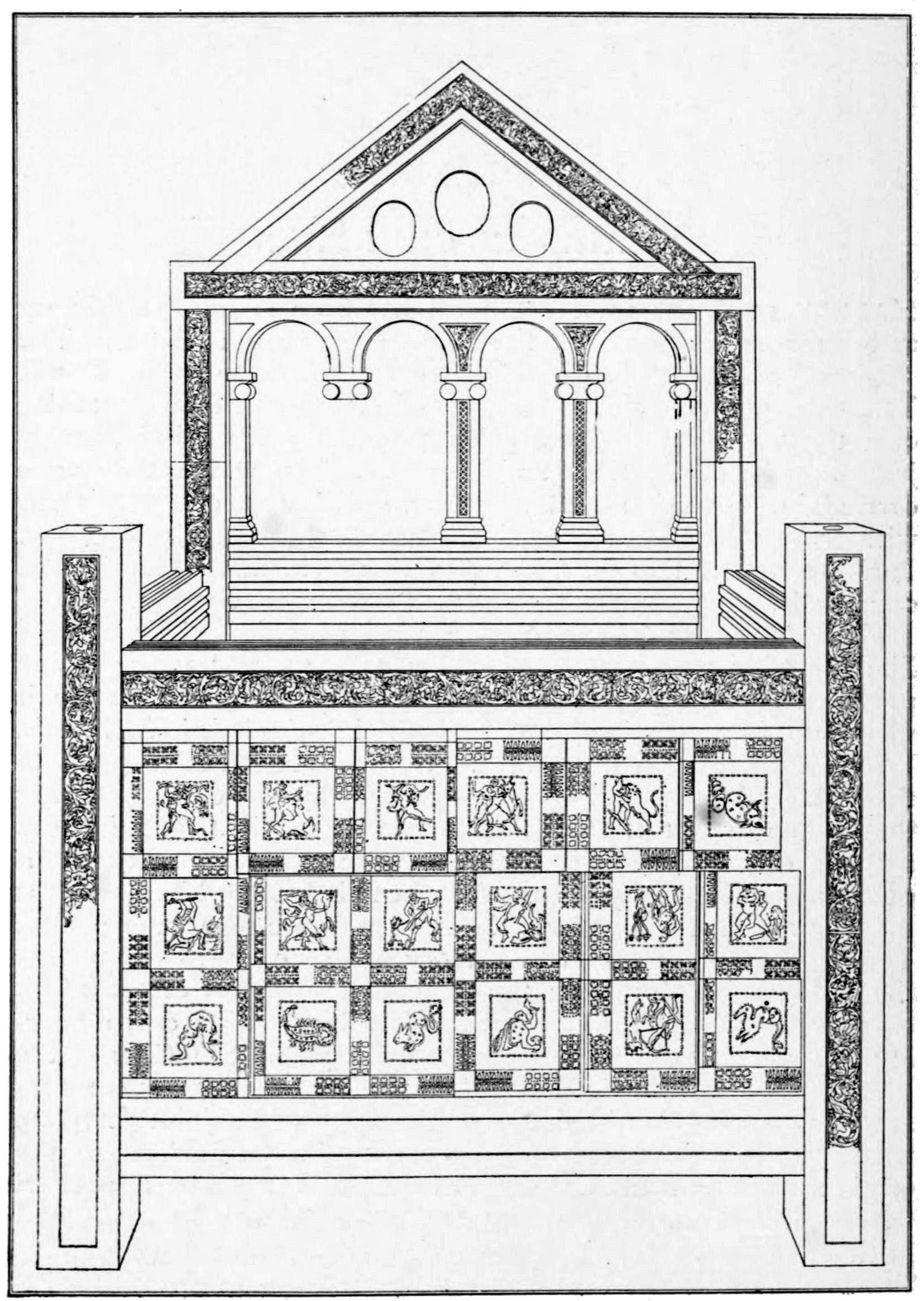
The Pope's throne in St. Peter's Basilica, Vatican City (From Wood Carvings in English Churches, 1910)

The Chair of Saint Peter (Latin: Cathedra Petri), also known as the Throne of Saint Peter, is a relic conserved in St. Peter's Basilica in Vatican City. The relic is a wooden throne that tradition claims belonged to the Apostle Saint Peter, the leader of the Early Christians in Rome and first Pope, and which he used as Bishop of Rome. The relic is enclosed in a sculpted gilt bronze casing designed by Gian Lorenzo Bernini and constructed between 1647 and 1653. In 2012, Pope Benedict XVI described the chair as "a symbol of the special mission of Peter and his Successors to tend Christ's flock, keeping it united in faith and in charity."

The wooden throne was a gift from Emperor of the Romans Charles the Bald to Pope John VIII in 875. It has been studied many times over the years, most recently between 1968 and 1974. The study concluded that it was not a double, but a single chair, with a covering, and that the oldest parts are from the 6th century. The Chair of Saint Peter is the second altar within the church, with the first one being the one under St. Peter's Baldachin. It stands to remind visitors of the Catholic Church's authority.

In January 2024, the Vatican Museums, Fabbrica di San Pietro, the Commission for the Protection of Monuments and other Vatican institutions announced a restoration campaign of the baldachin over the high altar and adjacent Altar of the Chair that was expected to cost approximately €700,000 and was funded by a gift from the Knights of Columbus. This was the first major work done in these areas since 1758.

On 27 October 2024, the newly restored chair was shown in public for the first time since 1867, on a decision by Pope Francis. After the concluding Mass of the Synod on Synodality, it was centered in front of the baldachin. By 28 October, the chair was in front of the right front pillar. The chair was due to be on display until 8 December 2024 but was returned to the reliquary on 26 November 2024.

== Description ==
The relic itself is described as an oaken chair damaged by cuts and worms. The chair has metal rings attached to each side, allowing use as a sedia gestatoria. The back and front of the chair are trimmed with carved ivory. This description comes from 1867, when the relic was photographed and displayed for veneration.

The reliquary, like many of the medieval period, takes the form of the relic it protects, i.e. the form of a chair. Symbolically, the chair Bernini designed had no earthly counterpart in actual contemporary furnishings. It is formed entirely of scrolling members, enclosing a coved panel where the upholstery pattern is rendered as a low relief of Christ instructing Peter to tend to his sheep. Large angelic figures flank an openwork panel beneath a highly realistic bronze seat cushion, vividly empty: the relic is encased within. (Note: In late 17th-century Venice, Andrea Brustolon constructed a few grandiose armchairs that employ similar sculptural figures doing duty as front legs and armrest supports.)

The cathedra is lofted on splayed scrolling bars that appear to be effortlessly supported by four over-lifesize bronze Doctors of the Church: Western doctors Saint Ambrose and Saint Augustine of Hippo on the outsides, wearing miters, and Eastern doctors Saint John Chrysostom and Saint Athanasius on the insides, both bare-headed. The cathedra appears to hover over the altar in the basilica's apse, lit by a central tinted window through which light streams, illuminating the gilded glory of sunrays and sculpted clouds that surrounds the window. Like Bernini's Ecstasy of Saint Theresa, this is a definitive fusion of the Baroque arts, unifying sculpture and richly polychrome architecture and manipulating effects of light.

Above, on the golden background of the frieze, is the Latin inscription: "O Pastor Ecclesiae, tu omnes Christi pascis agnos et oves" ('O Shepherd of the Church, you feed all Christ's lambs and sheep'). On the right is the same writing in Greek, "ΣΥ ΒΟΣΚΕΙΣ ΤΑ ΑΡΝΙΑ, ΣΥ ΠΟΙΜΑΙΝΕΙΣ ΤΑ ΠΡΟΒΑΤΙΑ ΧΡΙΣΤΟΥ". Behind the altar is placed Bernini's monument enclosing the wooden chair, both of which are seen as symbolic of the authority of the Bishop of Rome as Vicar of Christ and successor of Saint Peter.

== Feast of the Chair of Saint Peter ==
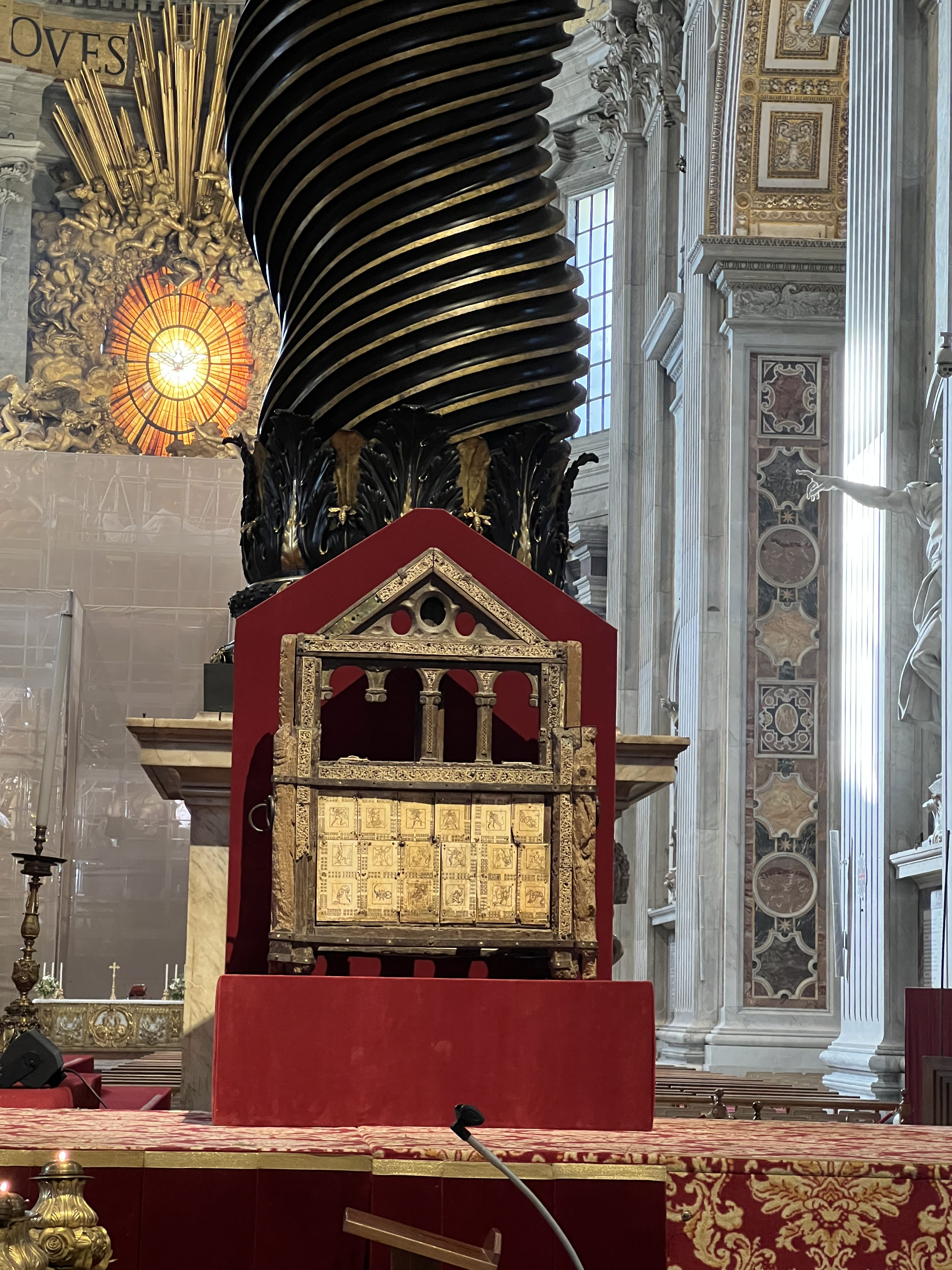
The Chair of St. Peter in 2024 at St. Peter's Basilica, exposed for the first time since 1867

Early martyrologies indicate that two liturgical feasts were celebrated in Rome, centuries before the time of Charles the Bald, in honour of earlier chairs associated with Saint Peter, one of which was kept in the baptismal chapel of Old St. Peter's Basilica, the other at the catacomb of Priscilla. The dates of these celebrations were 18 January and 22 February. No surviving chair has been identified with either of these chairs. The feasts thus became associated with an abstract understanding of the "Chair of Peter", which by synecdoche signifies the episcopal office of the Pope as Bishop of Rome, an office considered to have been first held by Saint Peter, and thus extended to the diocese, the See of Rome.

According to historian Anton de Waal, although both feasts were originally associated with Saint Peter's stay in Rome, the ninth-century form of the Martyrologium Hieronymianum associated the January 18 feast with his stay in Rome, and the 22 February feast with his stay at Antioch. The two feasts were included in the Tridentine calendar with the rank of Double, which Pope Clement VIII raised in 1604 to the newly invented rank of Greater Double.

In 1960 Pope John XXIII deleted the January 18 feast from the General Roman Calendar, along with seven other feast days that were duplicate feasts of a single saint or mystery. The 22 February celebration became a Second-Class Feast. This calendar was incorporated in the 1962 Roman Missal of Pope John XXIII, whose continued use Pope Benedict XVI authorized under the conditions indicated in his motu proprio Summorum Pontificum. Traditionalist Catholics who use older calendars continue to celebrate both feast days: Saint Peter's Chair at Rome on 18 January and the Chair of Saint Peter at Antioch on 22 February.

In the new classification of holy days introduced in 1969, the 22 February celebration has the rank of Feast.

== See also ==
- List of works by Gian Lorenzo Bernini
- Index of Vatican City-related articles
