= Charles Le Beauclerc =

French statesman and diplomat

Charles Le Beauclerc (around 1560 – 12 October 1630), Lord of Achères and Rougemont, was a French statesman during the 17th Century. He held the posts of Intendant des finances (1623–24) and of Secretary of State for War (1624–30) under King Louis XIII.

== Biography ==
The son of a Treasurer General of Extraordinary War Expenses, he was the chief clerk to Martin Ruzé de Beaulieu and became Intendant of Finance on 24 January 1623.

On 5 February 1624, he was appointed Secretary of State for War.
Charles Le Beauclerc was the first Secretary of State for War to fully exercise his authority over the Kingdom's military administration. Between 1617 and 1626, a series of regulations clarified the Secretary of State's responsibilities, gradually concentrating the administration of war in his hands, to the detriment of the former geographical distribution of affairs. Furthermore, from 1626 onward, following the death of François de Bonne, Duke of Lesdiguières, the office of Constable of France was abolished, thus removing the only authority over the Secretary of State of War, besides that of the King.

He also abolished the post of Admiral of France and the 200 gentlemen of the King's chamber, but created 12 generals of finance for the camps, armies and garrisons of France.
He accompanied the King to the Siege of La Rochelle in 1627–28.

In 1621, Charles Le Beauclerc bought the Lordships of Rougemont and Achères from Charles Hotman.

Political offices
Preceded by Pierre Baudouyn de Soupir et des Portes	Intendant des finances 1623–1624	Succeeded by Louis Tronson
Preceded by Pierre Brûlart, marquis de Sillery	Secretary of State for War; 1624–1630	Succeeded by Abel Servien
