= Paul Fréart de Chantelou =

French collector and patron of the arts

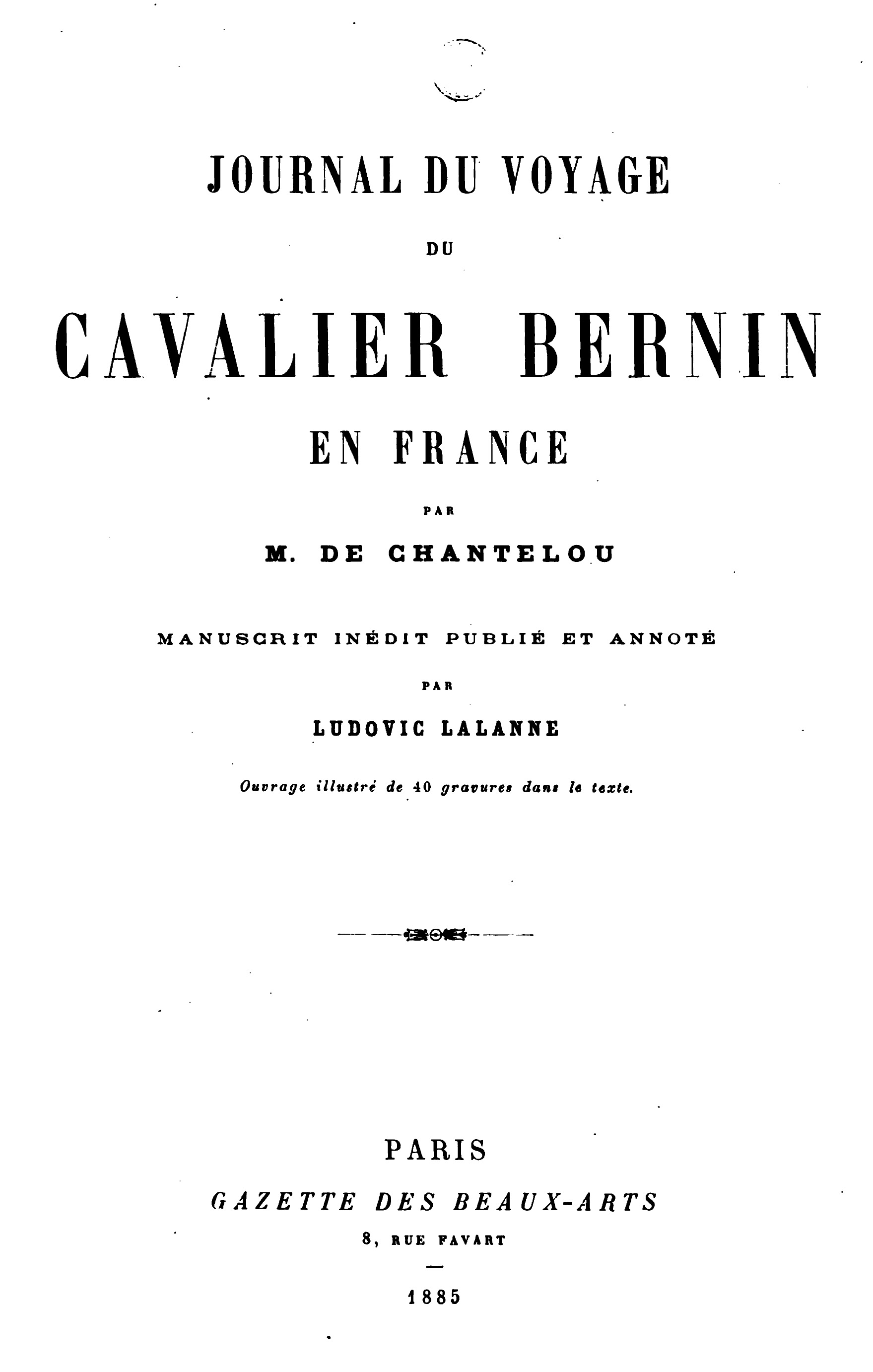
Title page of Fréart de Chantelou's Journal du voyage du cavalier Bernin

Paul Fréart de Chantelou (25 March 1609 – 1694) was a French collector and patron of the arts. He encouraged major artists of his era, in particular Nicolas Poussin (1594–1665) and Gian Lorenzo Bernini (1598–1680), and is known for his diary describing Bernini's visit to Paris in 1665 (first published in 1885).

== Early life ==
Paul Fréart was born in Le Mans, the third son of Jean Fréart, sieur de Chantelou and grand provost of Maine (died 1611). Paul's older brothers, Jean Fréart, sieur de Chantelou (1604–1674), and Roland Fréart, sieur de Chambray (1606–1676), were also connoisseurs and patrons of the arts.

== Chantelou and Poussin ==
In 1638 Paul Fréart de Chantelou became a secretary to his cousin, François Sublet de Noyers, the superintendent of the Bâtiments du Roi, who sent Paul and his brother Roland to Rome in 1639 and 1640, principally to fetch Poussin, but also to bring back casts and designs of Roman antiquities for the French court. Poussin's return to Paris in December 1640 would doubtless have resulted in the end of his artistic career had he not attached himself to a prestigious clientele of Parisian amateurs, among whom Chantelou was of the most influential. The two men had a long correspondence which even today provides a rich source of details on the artist's life and his artistic conception.

Among Chantelou's commissions from Poussin after his time in Paris are his Seven Sacraments (1644–1648), once in the collection of the duke of Sutherland and now in the store of the National Gallery of Scotland, and the famous Self-portrait (1650), now in the musée du Louvre.

== Chantelou and Bernini ==
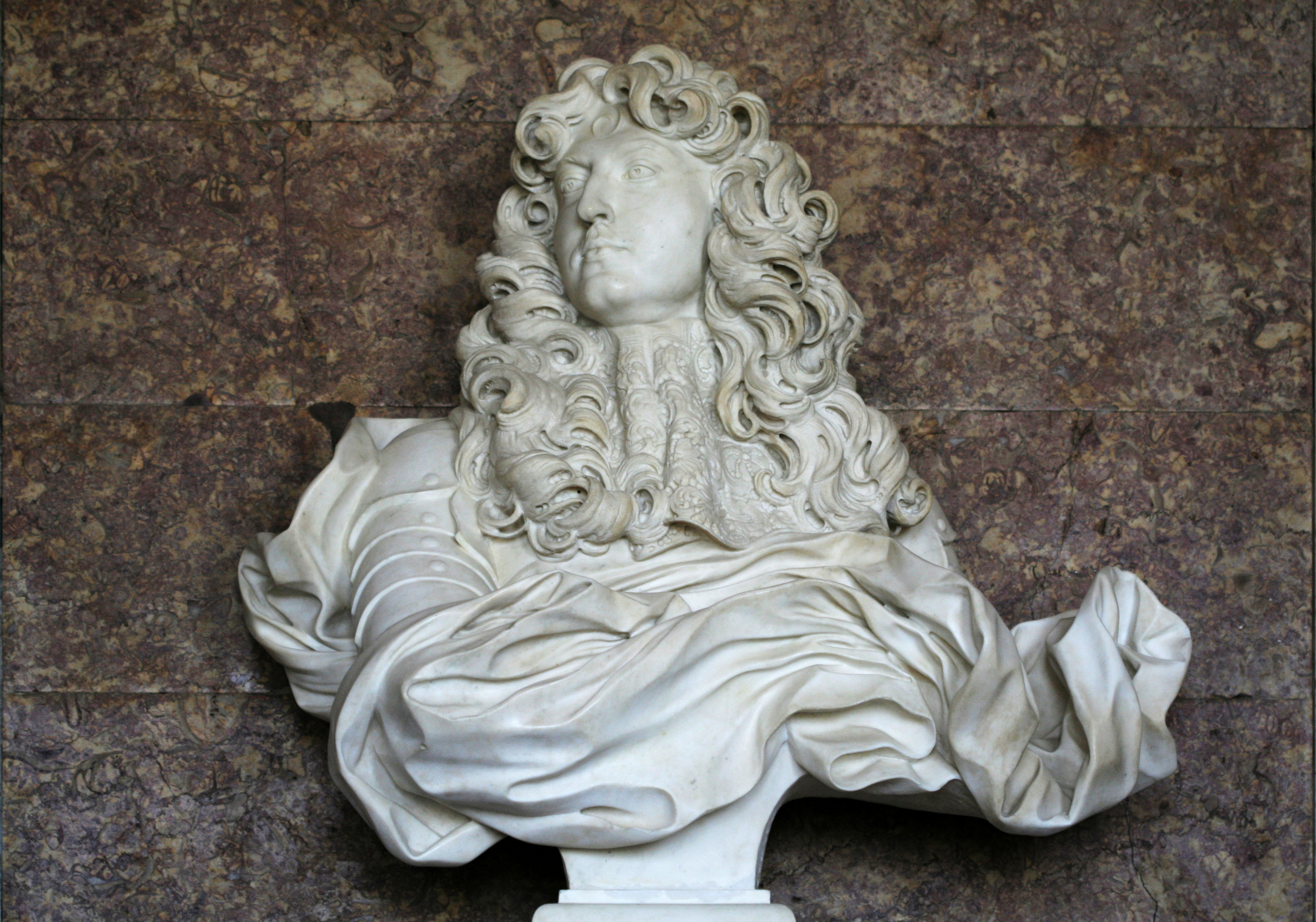
Bust of Louis XIV, by Gian Lorenzo Bernini (1665). The Journal describes in detail the gestation of this marble bust of the King. This is one of the few portraits for which Louis XIV agreed to pose: he allowed thirteen sittings.

In 1665, Louis XIV, through his intermediary and minister Colbert, summoned Bernini to Paris to take part in the rebuilding of the Louvre The king designated Chantelou to welcome him and accompany him during his stay in Paris. Chantelou kept a precise day-to-day Journal of this meeting—from Bernini's arrival in Paris at the start of June, to his departure five months later—which survives to this day. Intended for his brother (who lived in the provinces at the time and unable to meet the sculptor in person), this Journal has become a source of importance, for history and for art history. It not only tells of the artist's personality and the conception of his art (detailing, for example, the creation of the king's portrait), but also of everyday court life: confrontation between the king of France and the most renowned Italian artist of his time reveals the king's political clout.

== Bibliography ==
- Asfour, Amal (1996). "Fréart. (1) Roland Fréart" in Turner 1996, vol. 11, pp. 743–744. Also at Oxford Art Online (subscription required).
- Blunt, Anthony (1967). Nicolas Poussin. London: Palas-Athene. ISBN 9781873429648.
- Bull, Malcolm (1996). "Fréart. (2) Paul Fréart" in Turner 1996, vol. 11, p. 744. Also at Oxford Art Online (subscription required).
- Chardon, Henri (1867). Les frères Fréart de Chantelou. Le Mans: Monnoyer. Copy at Gallica.
- Dauvois, Daniel (2008). "Fréart, Paul", vol. 1, pp. 504–505, in The Dictionary of Seventeenth-Century French Philosophers, edited by Luc Foisneau. London: Continuum. ISBN 9780826418616.
- Fréart de Chantelou, Paul (1885). Journal du cavalier Bernin en France (in French), edited by Ludovic Lalanne. Paris: Gazette des Beaux-Arts. Copy at Internet Archive. Copy at Gallica. Reprinted 1981, Aix-en-Provence: Pandora. ISBN 9782863710265.
- Jouanny, Charles, editor (1911). Correspondance de Nicolas Poussin (in French). Paris: Archives de l'art français. Copy at Internet Archive.
- Turner, Jane, editor (1996). The Dictionary of Art, 34 volumes, reprinted with minor corrections in 1998. New York: Grove. ISBN 9781884446009.
