= Aglaé Cadet =

French artist (c. 1738–1801)

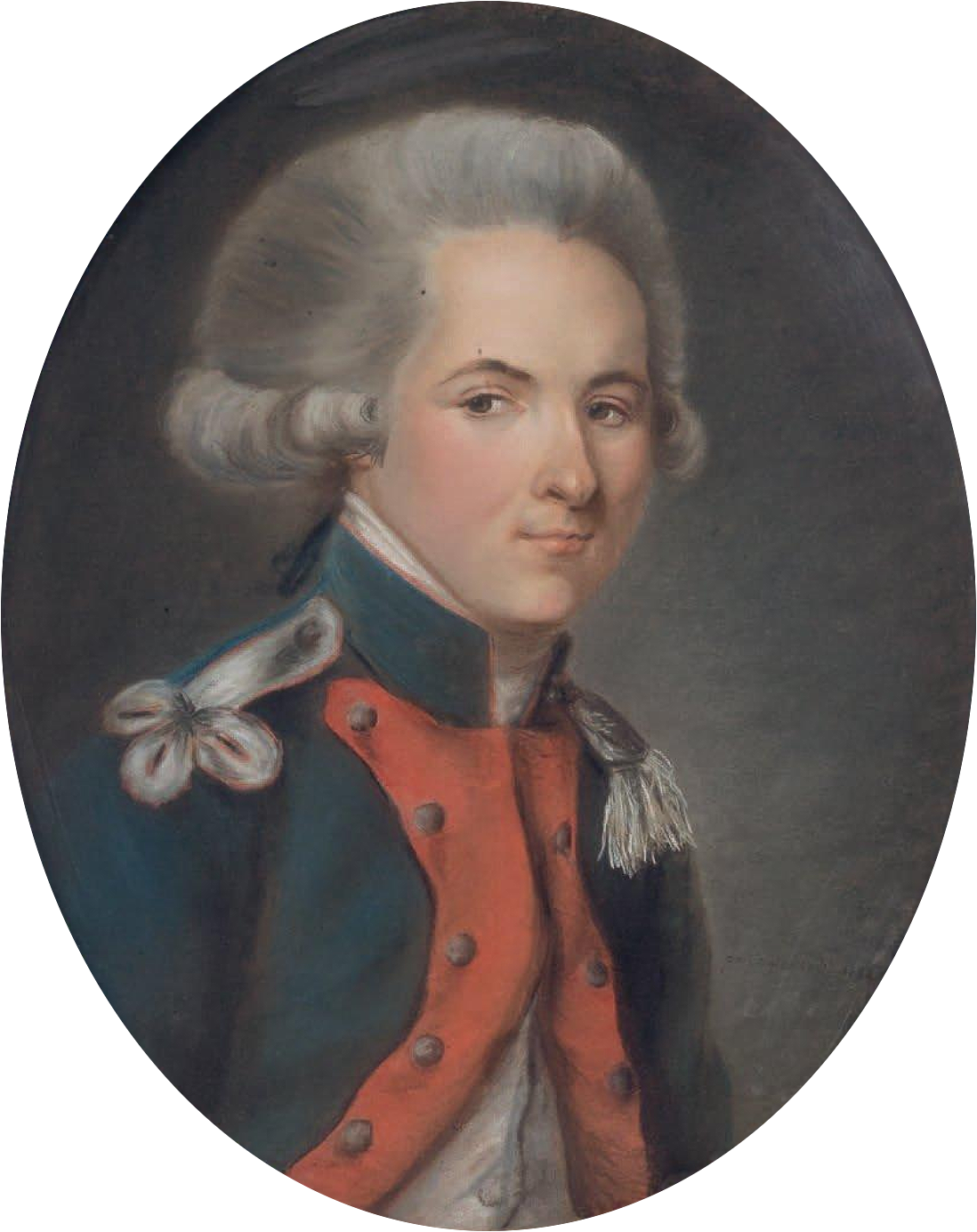
Aglaé Cadet, Portrait of Michel Victor Frédéric Moisson de Vaux, captain of Régiment des Dragons de la Reine, 1784

Aglaé-Geneviève-Eurélie Cadet de Gassicourt, known as Aglaé Cadet (c. 1738 – 1801) was a French enamelist and painter of miniatures.

Born in Paris, Cadet was the daughter of lawyer Jean-Pierre Joly, and was supposedly a distant relation of the marquis de Marigny; her family claimed a portion of his estate at one time. In 1761 she became the second wife of Claude-Antoine Cadet de Gassicourt. Their daughter Marie-Aglaé, later married to printseller Julien-François Fatou, became a miniaturist like her mother. A second daughter, Rosalie-Louise, having divorced her first husband, became the wife of the marquis de Montalembert, while a third, Henriette-Thérèse, married Jean-Baptiste Weyler, who is believed to have been her mother's instructor. The couple had three other daughters, and also had six sons. Mme. Cadet, named a peintre de la reine in 1787, was best known for her work in miniature and enamel, though a single pastel, similar in composition to those produced by Weyler, is known. At the Paris Salon of 1791 she showed a portrait of Jacques Necker; she is also known to have produced an enamel of Maurice de Saxe, after a work by Jean-Étienne Liotard, in 1789. Five of her enamels were in the collection of the 5th Duke of Aumont.
