= Saints Jerome and Mary Magdalen (Bernini) =

Sculptures by Gianlorenzo Bernini

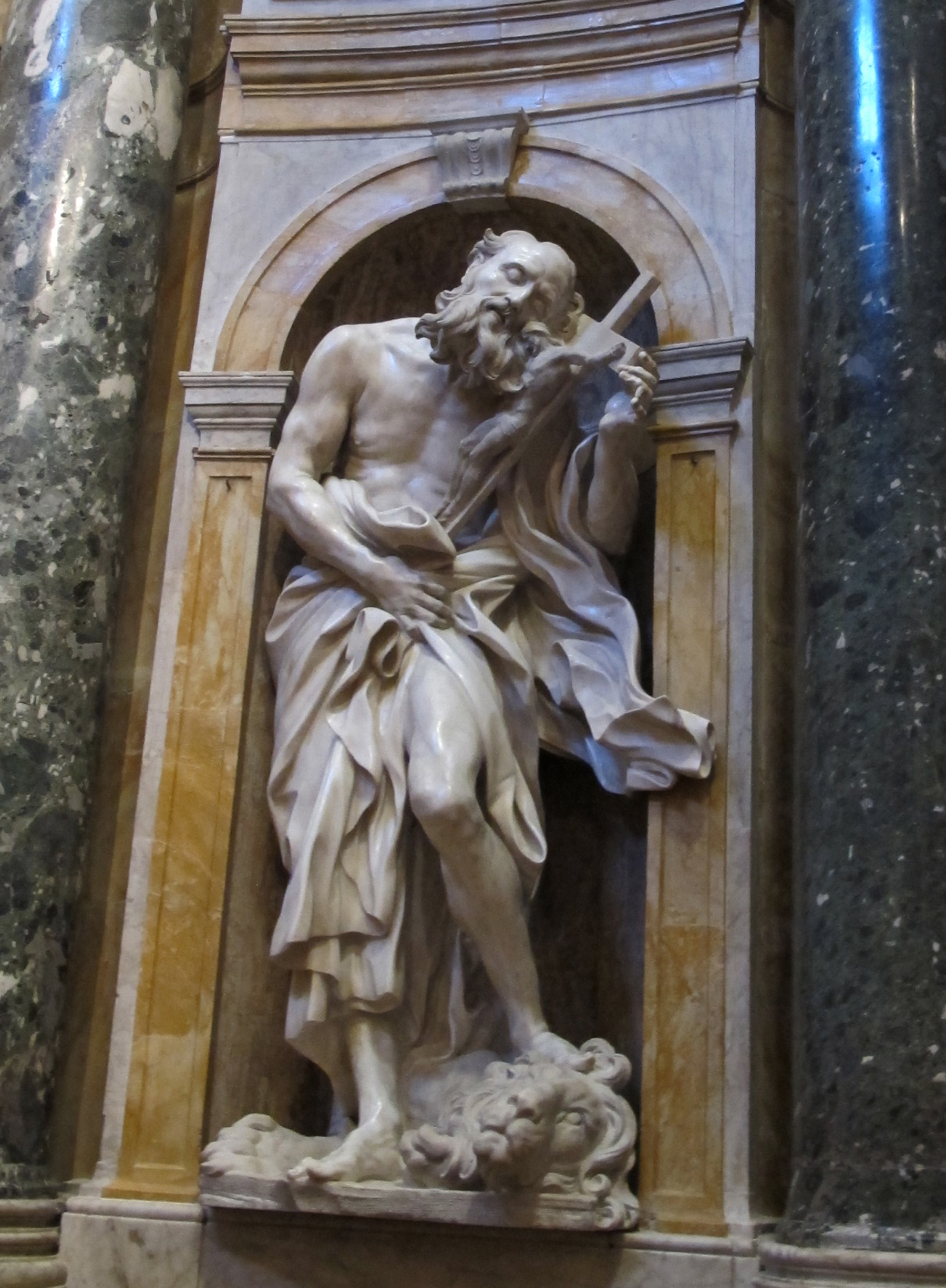
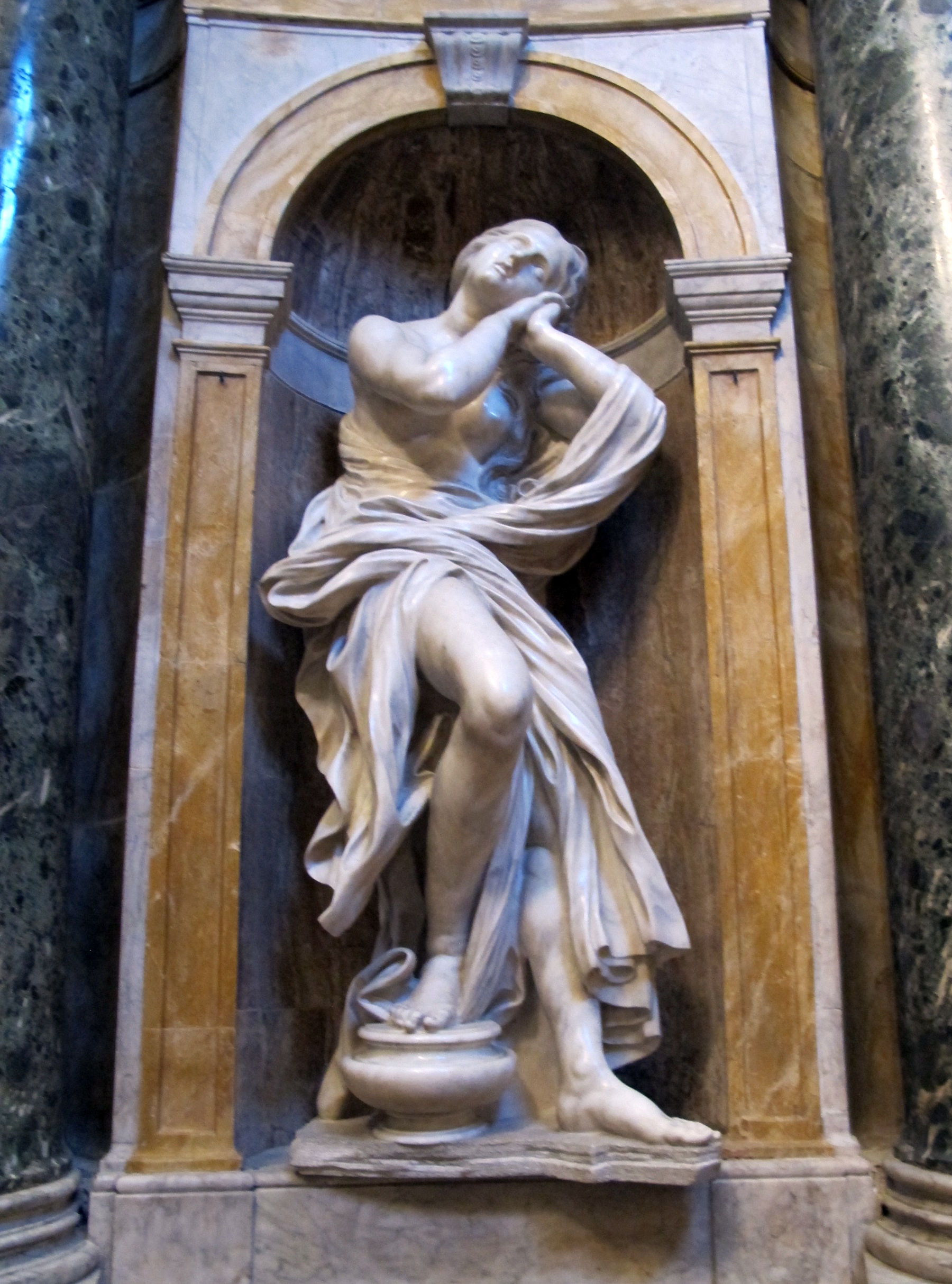
- Saint Jerome Mary Magdalen
- Artist: Gianlorenzo Bernini
- Year: 1661–1663
- Type: Marble Sculpture
- Location: Siena Cathedral, Siena
- Preceded by: Chair of Saint Peter
- Followed by: Statue of Alexander VII (Bernini)

Saints Jerome and Mary Magdalen are two sculptures by the Italian artist Gianlorenzo Bernini. They sit in the Chigi Chapel of Siena Cathedral. The statues were commissioned as part of the chapel by the then–pope Alexander VII (Fabio Chigi).

Work began on the sculptures in 1661 and they were delivered from Rome to Siena in 1663. Bernini was paid 2,128 scudi for his work, although he probably received considerable assistance in their creation.

Within the chapel, there are a further two sculptures by artists from Bernini's workshop – a St Catherine of Siena by Ercole Ferrata and a St Bernard of Siena by Antonio Raggi. The chapel as a whole was designed by Bernini.

Scholars have emphasised the mystical experience being undergone by the figures. Rudolf Wittkower documents the "intensification of the visionary quality" in the statues, both figures engaged not in the physical world around them, but absorbed in their own spiritual spaces. Howard Hibbard continues this line of argument, demonstrating how the figures break out of the niches which are supposed to contain them—further evidence of how Jerome and Mary Magdalen are not constrained by the earthly world but responding to something higher.

A preparatory drawing for the Mary Magdalen exists at the Leipzig Museum of Fine Arts, while there is preparatory sculpture of Jerome's head in the Fogg Art Museum of Harvard University.

== See also ==
- List of works by Gian Lorenzo Bernini
