= Hôtel d'Aumont =

Coordinates: 48°51′16″N 2°21′30″E

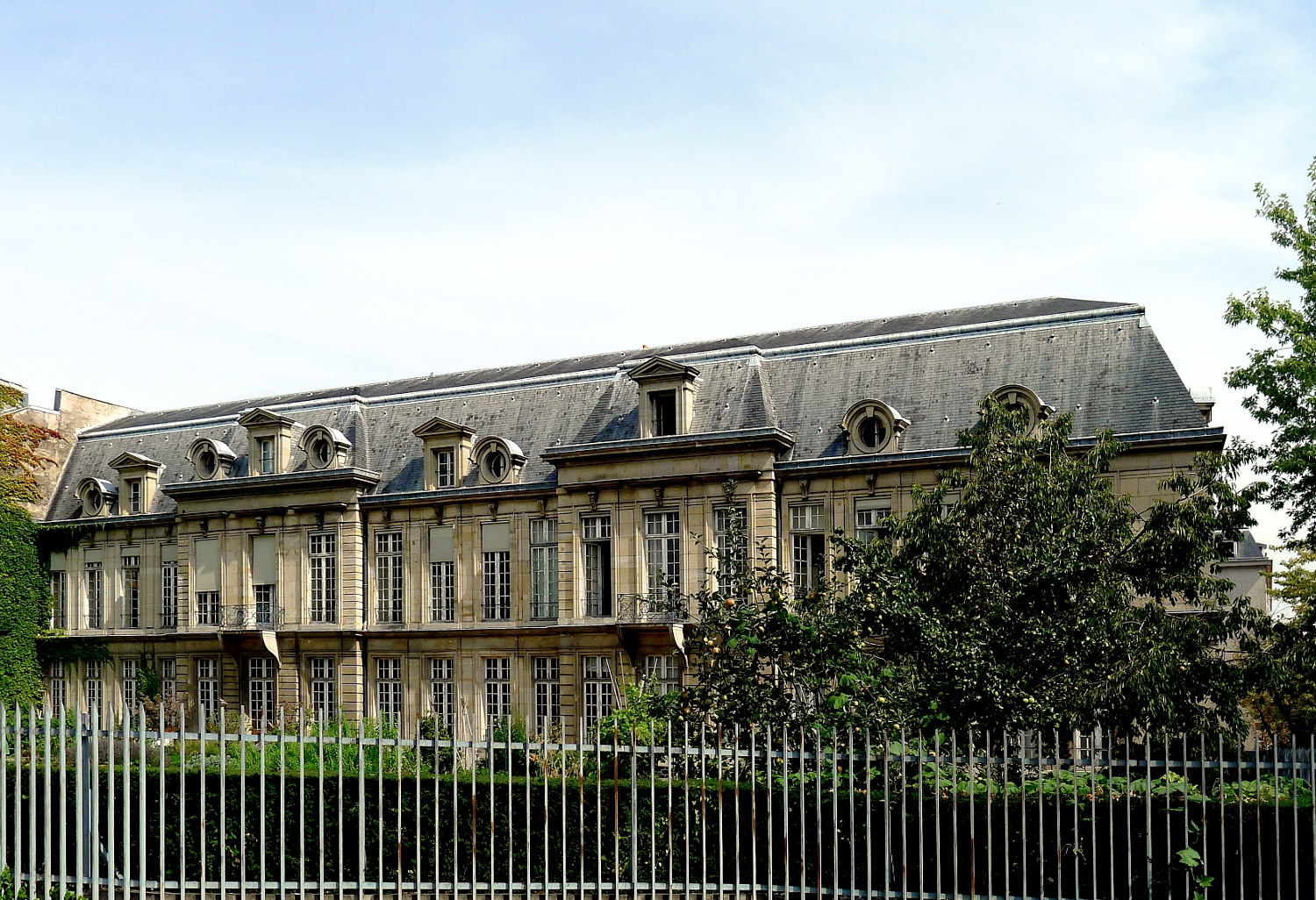
- Interactive map of the Hôtel d'Aumont area

General information
- Location: Paris, France

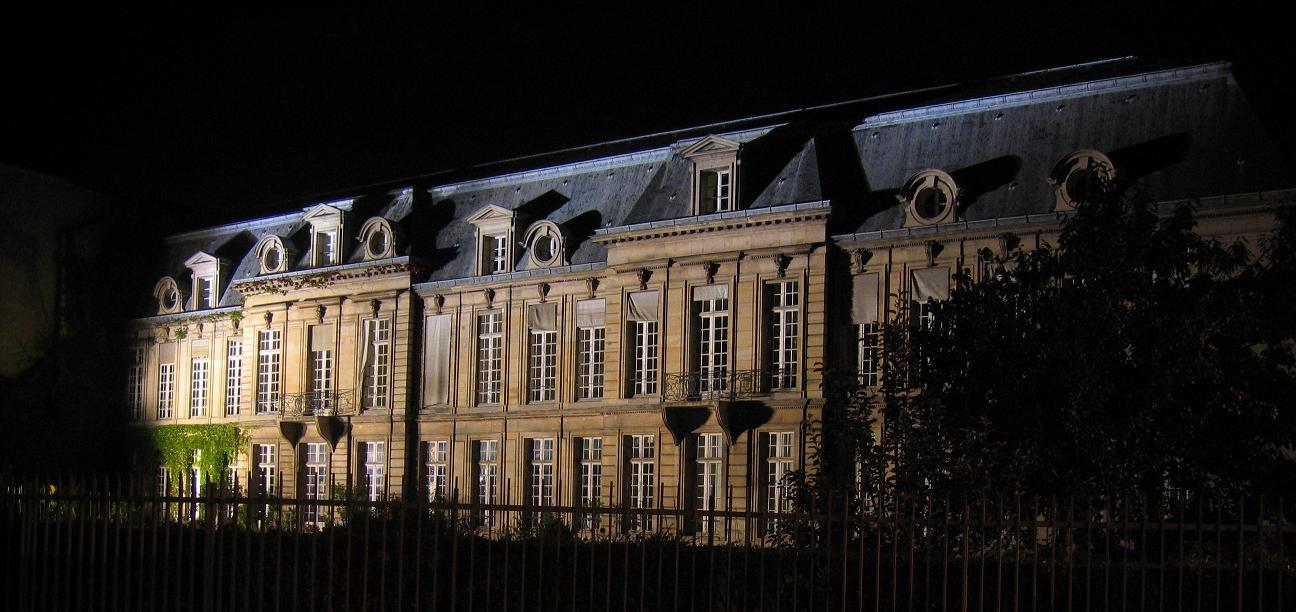
Garden front of the Hôtel d'Aumont, Paris

The Hôtel d'Aumont (French pronunciation: [otɛl domɔ̃]) is a former hôtel particulier, at 7, rue de Jouy, in the 4th arrondissement of Paris; it was built as the seat of the ducs d'Aumont. It is sited in the south of the Marais, facing rue de l’hôtel de Ville, quai de l’hôtel de Ville and the River Seine.

== History ==
At the beginning of the fifteenth century there was on part of this site a property at the Sign of the Die, belonging to the family of Cousinot, magistrates. In 1644 Michel-Antoine Scarron, conseiller du roi, and uncle of the burlesque poet Paul Scarron and father-in-law of the maréchal-duc d'Aumont, governor of Paris, found the old structure, on three adjoining properties, which he had assembled between 1619 and 1630, too old-fashioned for his requirements; though he had erected a party wall and constructed the left half of the present corps de logis as early as 1631, he rebuilt and extended it to create the present structure, built entre cour et jardin, to the designs of Louis Le Vau. Le Vau rearranged and completely refaced the earlier structures.

When the new building was completed in 1648, it was the duc d'Aumont who came to inhabit it, and he bought it outright from his father-in-law in 1656. For him it was enlarged and enriched by the architect François Mansart, who inserted a grand new staircase in the right wing, replaced the stairs in the corner pavilion, and provided it with decors painted by Charles Le Brun and Simon Vouet. The mason on-site, overseeing the new constructions was Michel Villedo. The name of André Le Nôtre is attached to its garden à la française; a garden has been remade linking the hôtel to the quai of the Seine.

Later, at the beginning of the eighteenth century, interior modernizations resulted in the present Cabinet neuf, currently the office of the president of the tribunal administratif.

Four ducs d'Aumont in succession lived at the hôtel, until the death in 1743 of Victoire-Félicité de Durfort, the wife of Louis-Marie-Augustin d'Aumont (1709–1782), who had married her in 1727: he sold the hôtel d'Aumont in 1756.

Several proprietors followed in succession: Charles Sandrié, attached to the Bâtiments du Roi, then Pierre Terray, brother of the financier the abbé Terray and procureur général of the Cour des aides until 1780. The Hôtel d'Aumont was sold by his heirs in 1795.

From 1802 until 1824, the building, in its commanding public situation, was rented to house the mairie of the arrondissement. From 1824 to 1859, it housed the boarders of the Lycée Charlemagne. After 1859, it became the property of the Pharmacie centrale de France and underwent some transformations: the garden was overbuilt with an assortment of service buildings, and the boiseries of the salons formed backgrounds to a variety of offices and storerooms. A history of the hôtel was issued, however, in 1903.

In 1938, the Hôtel d’Aumont was purchased by the City of Paris, and restored and classified as a monument historique. Since 1959 the tribunal administratif of Paris has been housed in it. A radical restoration of the decayed framework was completed in 1964.

== Architecture ==
The street front in the rue de Jouy presents a symmetrical, austerely unornamented range of two-storey buildings with a rusticated central arched porte cochère leading between ranges of stabling to the entrance court and matching end pavilions of three storeys, crowned with tall sloping slate roofs à la française, which are pierced with pedimented dormers. The cour d'honneur is enclosed by the five-bay principal corps de logis, corner pavilions and the identical flanking wings, of two storeys equal in value, of paired windows of four-over twelve panes framed in molding between lightly panelled piers. The keystones of the windows are integrated with sculptured friezes that run above them and serve as supports to the cornices, tying together all the elements of the design. Garlands of fruit and leaves, human and animal masks and carved draperies provide a rich decor.

The garden front (pictured) combines the end pavilions in a unified corps de logis with a pair of slightly projecting pavilions flanking the central three bays to break the long façade.
