= Michel Le Tellier =

French statesman (1603-1685)

- Marquis de Barbezieux; Seigneur de Chaville, d'Étang et de Viroflay
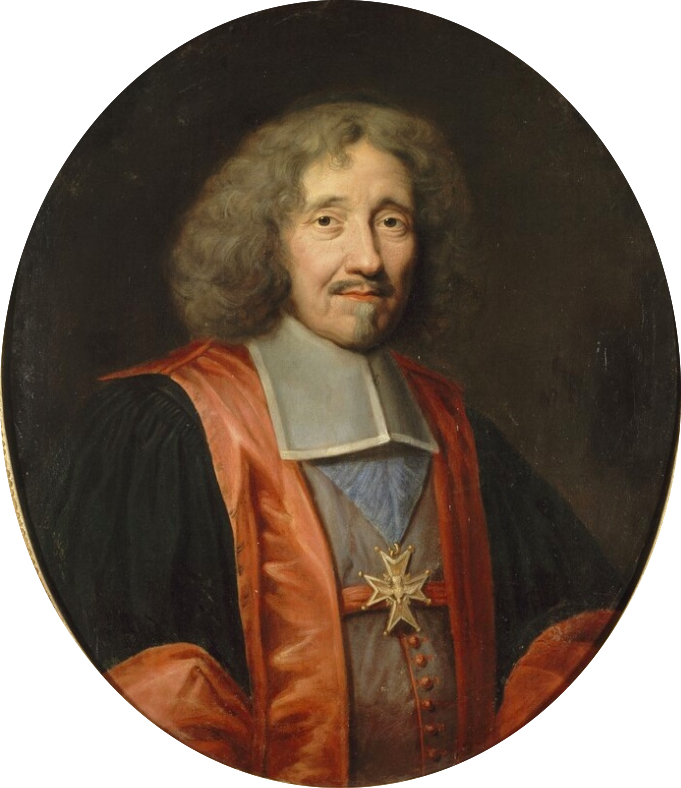
- Born: 19 April 1603; Paris, Kingdom of France
- Died: 10 October 1685 (aged 82); Paris, Kingdom of France
- Buried: Saint-Gervais-Saint-Protais
- Noble family: Le Tellier
- Spouse: Élisabeth Turpin
- Issue: François Michel Le Tellier; Charles Maurice Le Tellier; Madeleine Fare Le Tellier
- Father: Michel III Le Tellier
- Mother: Claude Chauvelin

Secretary of State for War of France
- In office 13 April 1643 – 19 July 1651
- Monarch: Louis XIV
- Regent (Note: During the minority age of Louis XIV): Anne of Austria
- First Minister of State: Cardinal Mazarin
- Preceded by: François Sublet de Noyers
- Succeeded by: Henri-Auguste de Loménie
- In office 27 December 1651 – 27 October 1677
- Monarch: Louis XIV
- First Minister of State: Cardinal Mazarin; Jean Baptiste Colbert
- Preceded by: Henri-Auguste de Loménie
- Succeeded by: François Michel Le Tellier

Chancellor of France
- In office 29 October 1677 – 30 October 1685
- Monarch: Louis XIV
- Preceded by: Étienne II d'Aligre
- Succeeded by: Louis Boucherat, Count of Compans

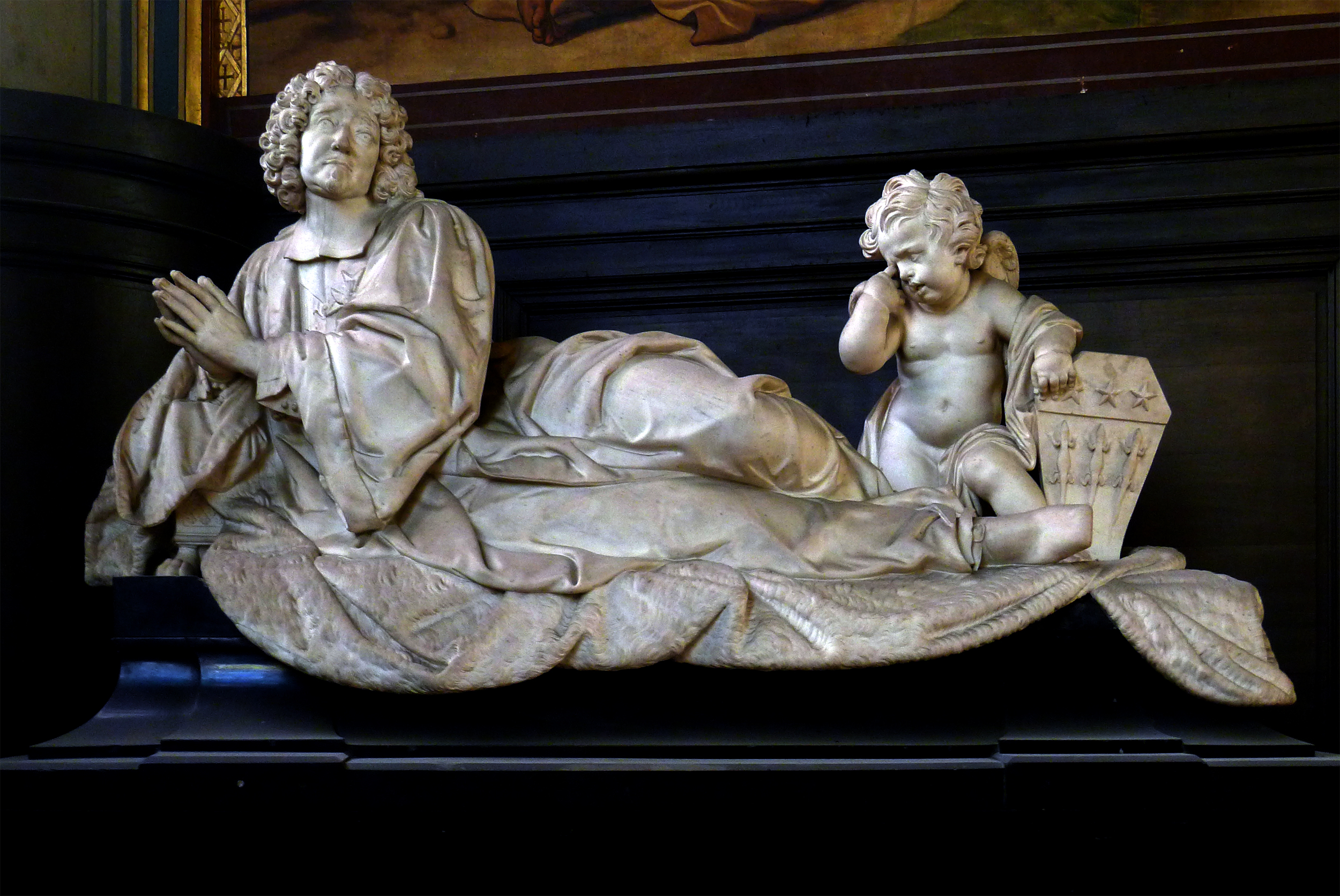
Funeral monument of Michel Le Tellier (1685)

Michel Le Tellier, marquis de Barbezieux, seigneur de Chaville et de Viroflay (French: [miʃɛl lə təlje]; 19 April 1603 – 30 October 1685) was a French statesman.

== Biography ==
Le Tellier was born in Paris to a Parisian magistrate, Michel III Le Tellier, and his wife, Claude Chauvelin. He entered the public service and became maître des requêtes, (a higher level lawyer, or 'procureur') in 1631 for Louis XIII. In 1640 le Tellier was appointed Intendant of Justice for the French military stationed in Piedmont, Italy. In 1643, owing to his friendship with the head French minister Cardinal Jules Mazarin, he became Secretary of State for Military Affairs (known as 'Secretary of State for War' during that era), and was known as being an efficient administrator. He was active in the troubles associated with the aristocratic Fronde uprising, remaining loyal to Cardinal Mazarin and to the state.

In 1677 he was made Chancellor of France. One of his major contributions as chancellor included his transformation of the royal army into a considerably larger, more professional force that helped impose the absolute rule of Louis XIV, helping to ensure France's dominance of Europe. As Chancellor, he also reestablished, in April 1679, the teaching of Civil Law at the University of Paris after Pope Honorius III had prohibited it on 11 May 1219.

Le Tellier, who despised Protestantism, was one of those who influenced Louis XIV to revoke the Edict of Nantes which had previously provided religious freedoms to them. He further encouraged the persecution of the Huguenots. He died in Versailles, 15 days after the revocation had been signed by Louis XIV and himself.

Le Tellier also amassed great wealth during his life and left two sons, one being famous statesman Louvois who also served France as Secretary of State for War, and who ultimately became one of the most powerful officials of the regime under his father's tutelage. Michel's other son Charles Maurice Le Tellier became the Archbishop of Reims.

Michel le Tellier's correspondence reside within the Bibliothèque nationale de France in Paris.

== Children ==
- François Michel Le Tellier (18 January 1641 – 16 July 1691), marquis de Louvois, married Anne de Souvré, Marquise de Courtenvaux, and had issue; his son the Marquis de Barbezieux succeeded him as Secretary of State for War; his grandson Louis Charles César Le Tellier was duke of Estrées, minister, and Marshal of France, and one of his grand daughters married Emmanuel Théodose de La Tour d'Auvergne, the Duke of Bouillon; amongst Louvois' direct descendants, we find Duke of Richelieu, and Empress Elisabeth of Austria (Sissi).
- Charles Maurice Le Tellier (18 July 1642 – 22 February 1710), Archbishop of Reims, a very influential leader of France's Catholic Church, and one of the main European bibliophiles.
- Madeleine Fare Le Tellier (1645 – 23 June 1668) married Louis Marie Victor d'Aumont, 2nd Duke of Aumont had issue; ancestress of Louise d'Aumont, Hereditary princess of Monaco. Present Prince of Monaco is a descendant of Madeleine Fare.

== See also ==
- Ancien Régime
- François-Michel le Tellier, Marquis de Louvois (le Tellier son)
- Charles Maurice Le Tellier (le Tellier son)
- French Wars of Religion
- Religious persecution
- Religious violence
- Religious war

== Notes ==
Political offices
Preceded by François Sublet de Noyers	Secretary of State for War; 1643–1666	Succeeded by François-Michel le Tellier, Marquis de Louvois
