= Michel Particelli d'Émery =

French politician

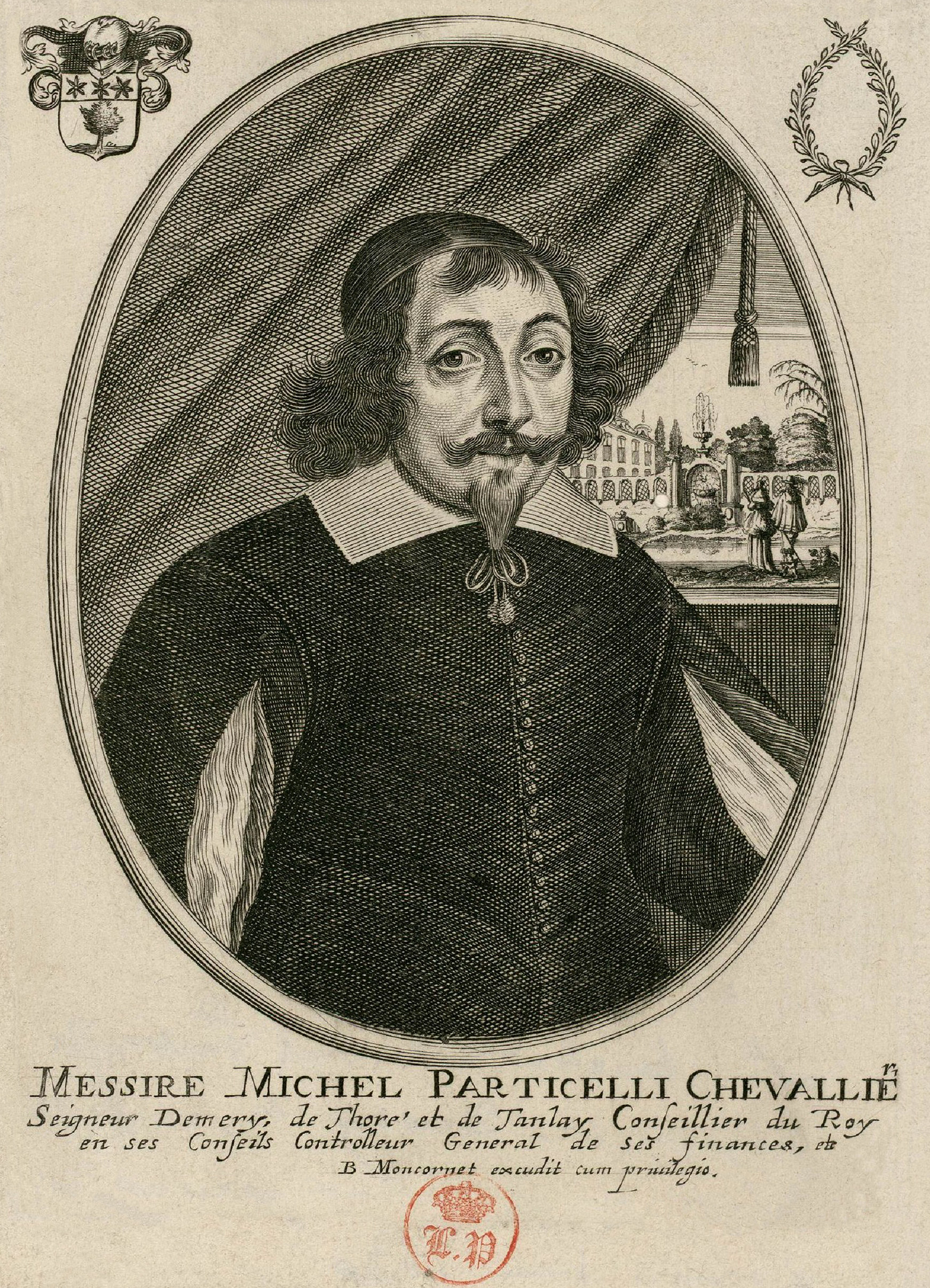
- Michel Particelli d'Émery by Balthasar Moncornet
- Born: 6 June 1596; Lyon, France
- Died: 25 May 1650 (aged 54); Paris, France
- Occupation: Contrôleur général des finances

Michel Particelli d'Émery (6 June 1596 in Lyon – 25 May 1650 in Paris) was the son of a banker in Lyon, France. Originally from an Italian family of Lucca, Italy, he was the counsellor of Cardinal-Duke of Richelieu. A portrait of him was changed by Théophile-Abraham Hamel to give a face to Samuel de Champlain.

According to the Archives Canada site, d'Émery's face was used to represent Champlain for more than a century and is still used by many historians to represent Champlain.
