= Villequier-Aumont =

- Commune
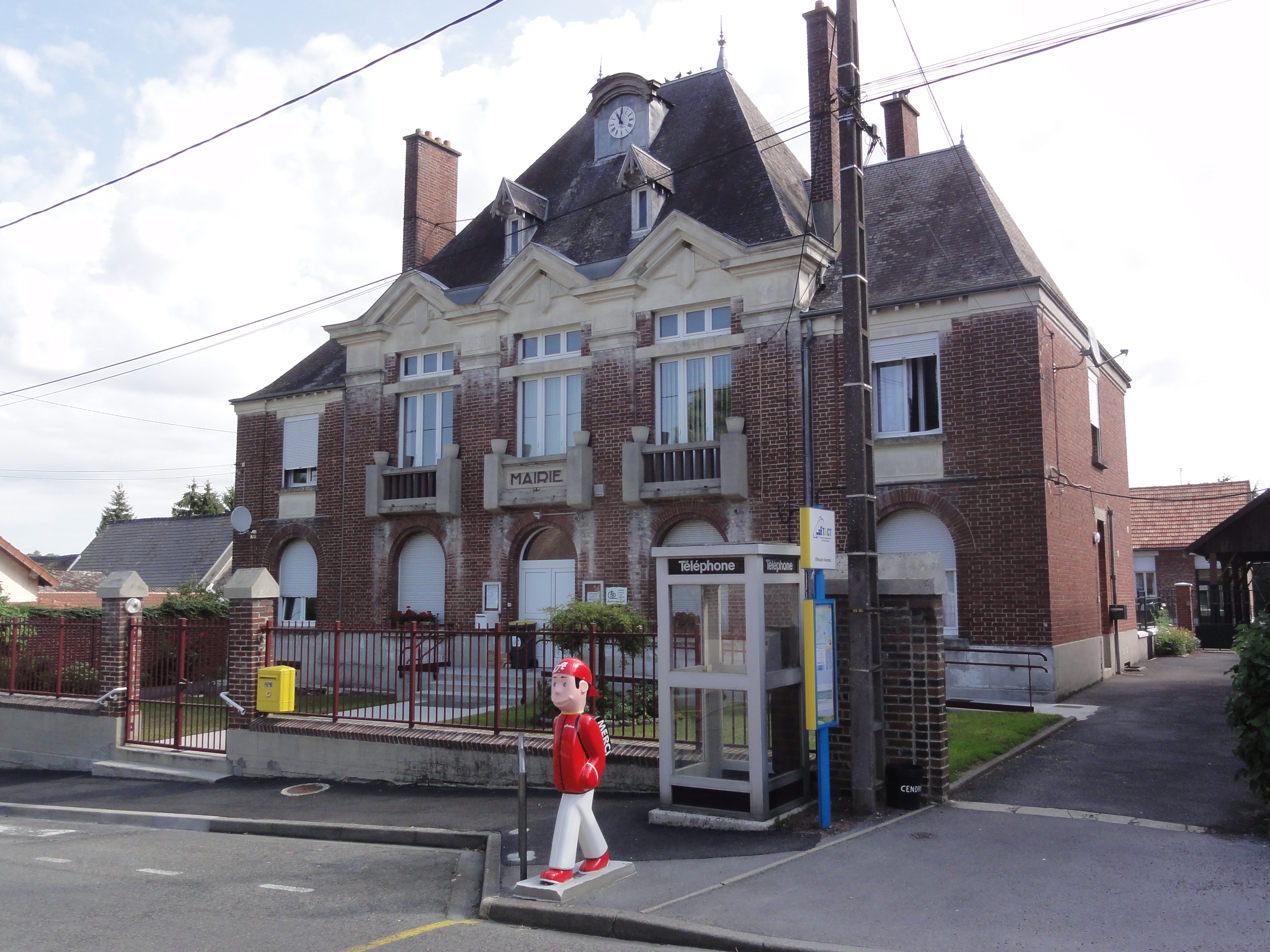
- The town hall of Villequier-Aumont
- Location of Villequier-Aumont
- Location within France Location within Hauts-de-France
- Coordinates: 49°39′29″N 3°12′25″E
- Country: France
- Region: Hauts-de-France
- Department: Aisne
- Arrondissement: Laon
- Canton: Chauny
- Intercommunality: CA Chauny Tergnier La Fère

Government
  - Mayor (2026–32): Loïc Chala
- Area^{1}: 12.34 km^{2} (4.76 sq mi)
- Elevation: 84 m (276 ft)
- Highest elevation: 121 m (397 ft)
- Lowest elevation: 52 m (171 ft)
- Population (2023): 684
  - Density: 55.4/km^{2} (144/sq mi)
- Time zone: UTC+01:00 (CET)
  - Summer (DST): UTC+02:00 (CEST)
- INSEE/Postal code: 02807 /02300
- ^{1} French Land Register data, which excludes lakes, ponds, glaciers > 1 km^{2} (0.386 sq mi or 247 acres) and river estuaries.

Villequier-Aumont (French pronunciation: [vilkje omɔ̃]) is a commune in the Aisne department in Hauts-de-France in northern France.

Villequier-Aumont was formerly called Genlis, and was the seat of a marquisate.

== Population ==
Historical population
Year	Pop.	±% p.a.
1968	503	—
1975	504	+0.03%
1982	600	+2.52%
1990	603	+0.06%
1999	602	−0.02%
2007	595	−0.15%
2012	639	+1.44%
2017	646	+0.22%
2023	684	+0.96%
Source: INSEE

== See also ==
- Communes of the Aisne department
