= Aumont, Somme =

Aumont
- Commune
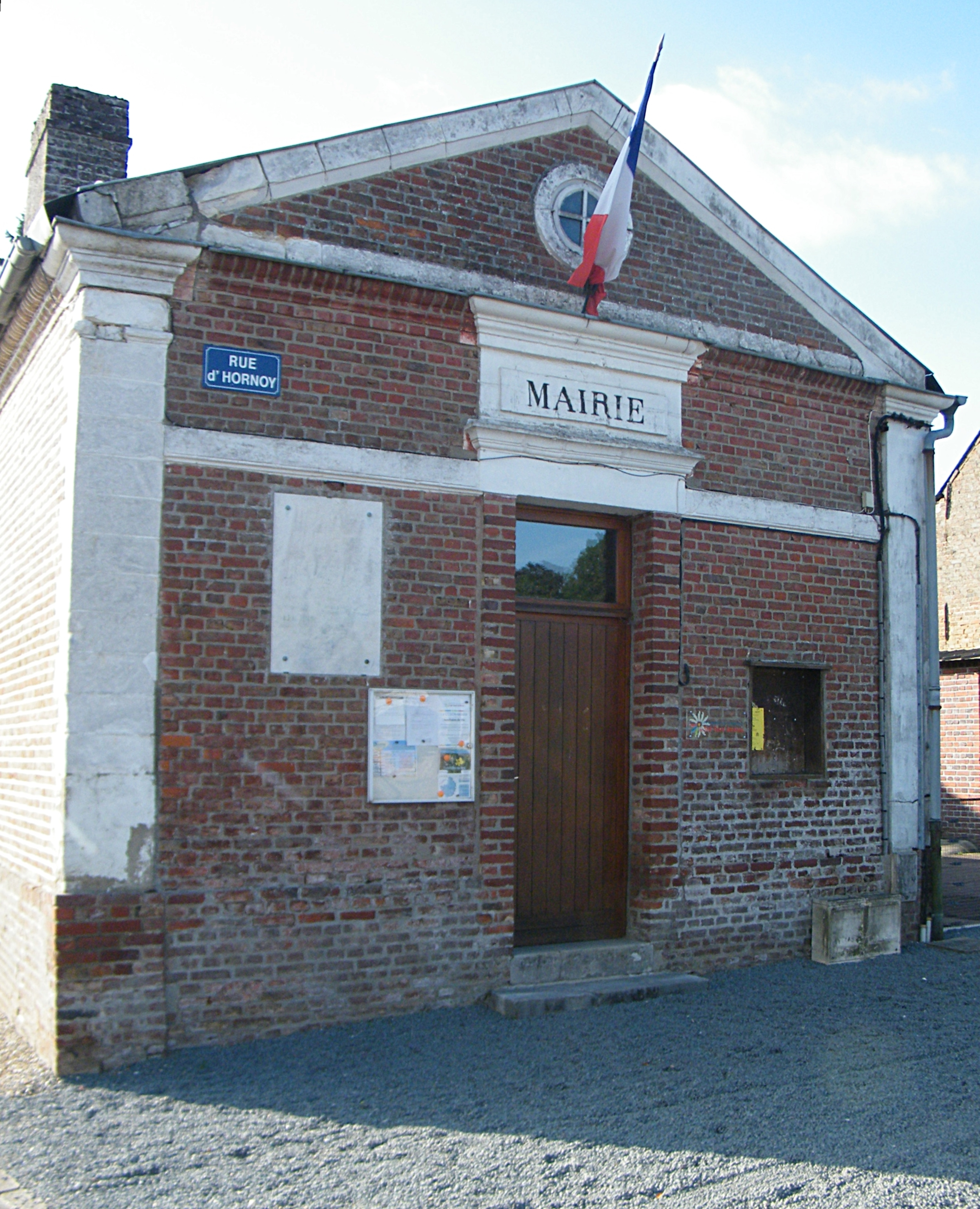
- The town hall in Aumont

- Coat of arms
- Location of Aumont
- Location within France Location within Hauts-de-France
- Coordinates: 49°52′59″N 1°55′01″E
- Country: France
- Region: Hauts-de-France
- Department: Somme
- Arrondissement: Amiens
- Canton: Poix-de-Picardie
- Intercommunality: CC Somme Sud-Ouest

Government
  - Mayor (2020–2026): Christophe Martin
- Area^{1}: 3.31 km^{2} (1.28 sq mi)
- Elevation: 127 m (417 ft)
- Highest elevation: 145 m (476 ft)
- Lowest elevation: 90 m (300 ft)
- Population (2023): 119
  - Density: 36.0/km^{2} (93.1/sq mi)
- Time zone: UTC+01:00 (CET)
  - Summer (DST): UTC+02:00 (CEST)
- INSEE/Postal code: 80041 /80640
- ^{1} French Land Register data, which excludes lakes, ponds, glaciers > 1 km^{2} (0.386 sq mi or 247 acres) and river estuaries.

Aumont (French pronunciation: [omɔ̃]) is a commune in the Somme department in Hauts-de-France in northern France.

== See also ==
- Communes of the Somme department
