= Pierre Rabon =

French painter

- Born: 18 October 1619; Le Havre, Province of Normandy, France
- Died: 18 January 1684 (aged 64); Paris
- Occupation: painter
- Known for: Portrait of Antoine de Ratabon
- Spouse: Louise Gomboust
- Children: Nicolas Rabon

Pierre Rabon (18 October 1619 – 18 January 1684) was a French portrait painter, who was active during the reign of Louis XIV.

== Early life ==
Rabon was born in Le Havre.

== Career ==
Rabon became a member of the Académie Royale de Peinture et de Sculpture on 3 July 1660. His reception piece was a portrait of Antoine de Ratabon, who at the time was both Superintendent of Buildings (Surintendant des Bâtiments) and the director of the Académie. His portrait of Ratabon was for a long time believed to have been lost, but in 1994, a painting in the collection of the Château de Versailles, which had previously been identified by Albert Laprade as a portrait of the architect Louis Le Vau, was proposed as more likely to be Rabon's portrait of Ratabon.

Rabon exhibited a portrait of a Monsieur Perier at the Paris Salon of 1673. His other works include Portrait of a Woman (private collection) and three other portraits known from engravings: Claude Gallard, Councillor at the Parlement, engraved by Jean-Baptiste Humbelot; Louis Roupert, Master Goldsmith at Metz, engraved by Louis Cossin; and Hyacinthe Serroni, Archbishop of Albi, engraved by Gantrel. There are also records of copies commissioned by the Bâtiments du Roi: Christ on the Cross after Charles Le Brun in 1667 for the Menagerie at Versailles and Equestrian portrait of Louis XIV after Mignard in 1671.

In 2000, the painting Saint John Preaching in the Desert (Musée des Beaux-Arts, Carcassonne), previously believed to be a work by Sébastien Bourdon, was reattributed to Pierre Rabon.

== Personal life ==
Pierre Rabon married Louise Gomboust on 29 October 1643. Their son, Nicolas Rabon (1644–1686), became a history painter. Pierre Rabon died in Paris.

== Gallery ==
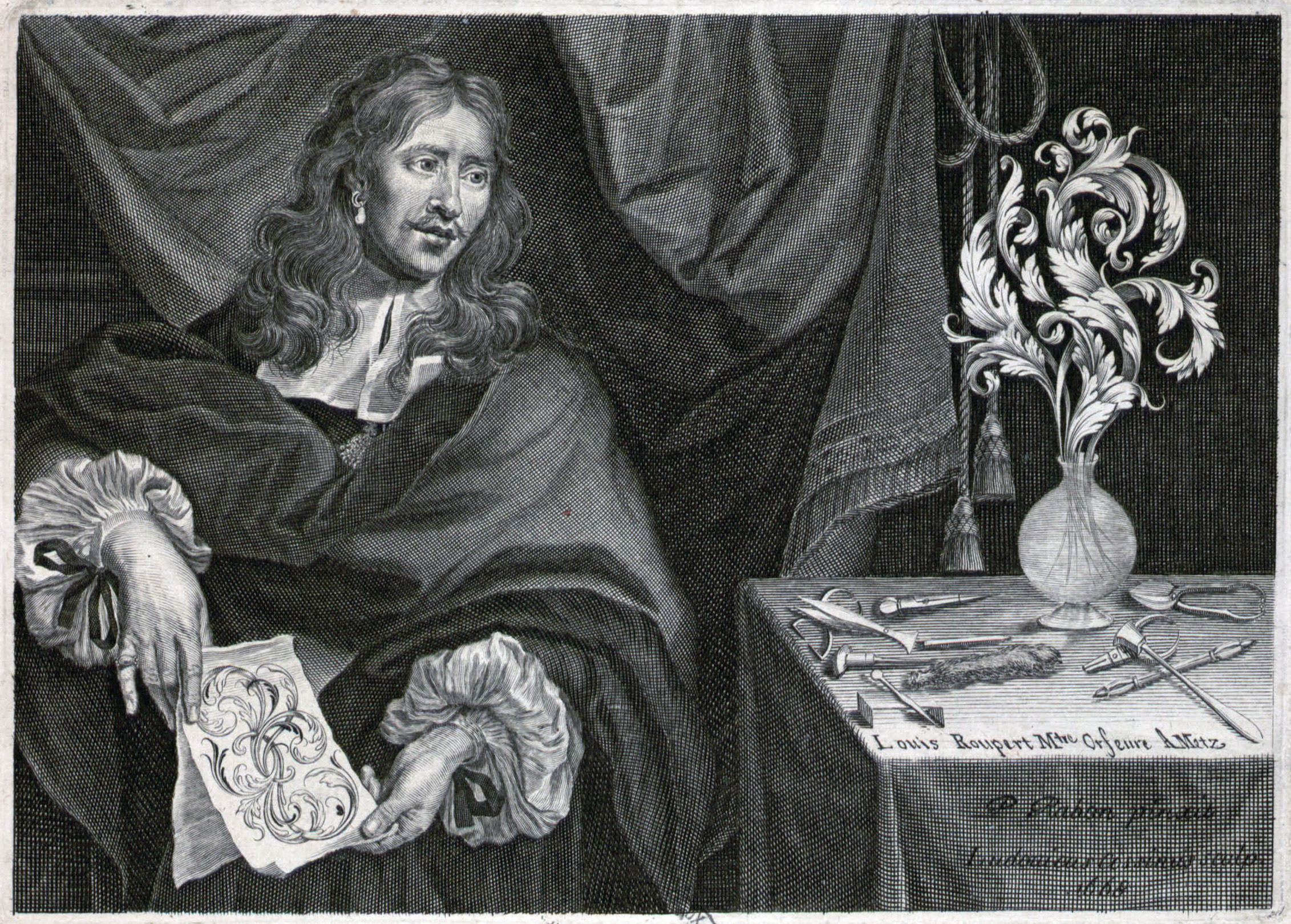
Louis Roupert, Master Goldsmith at Metz, engraved 1668 by Louis Cossin after a painting by Pierre Rabon

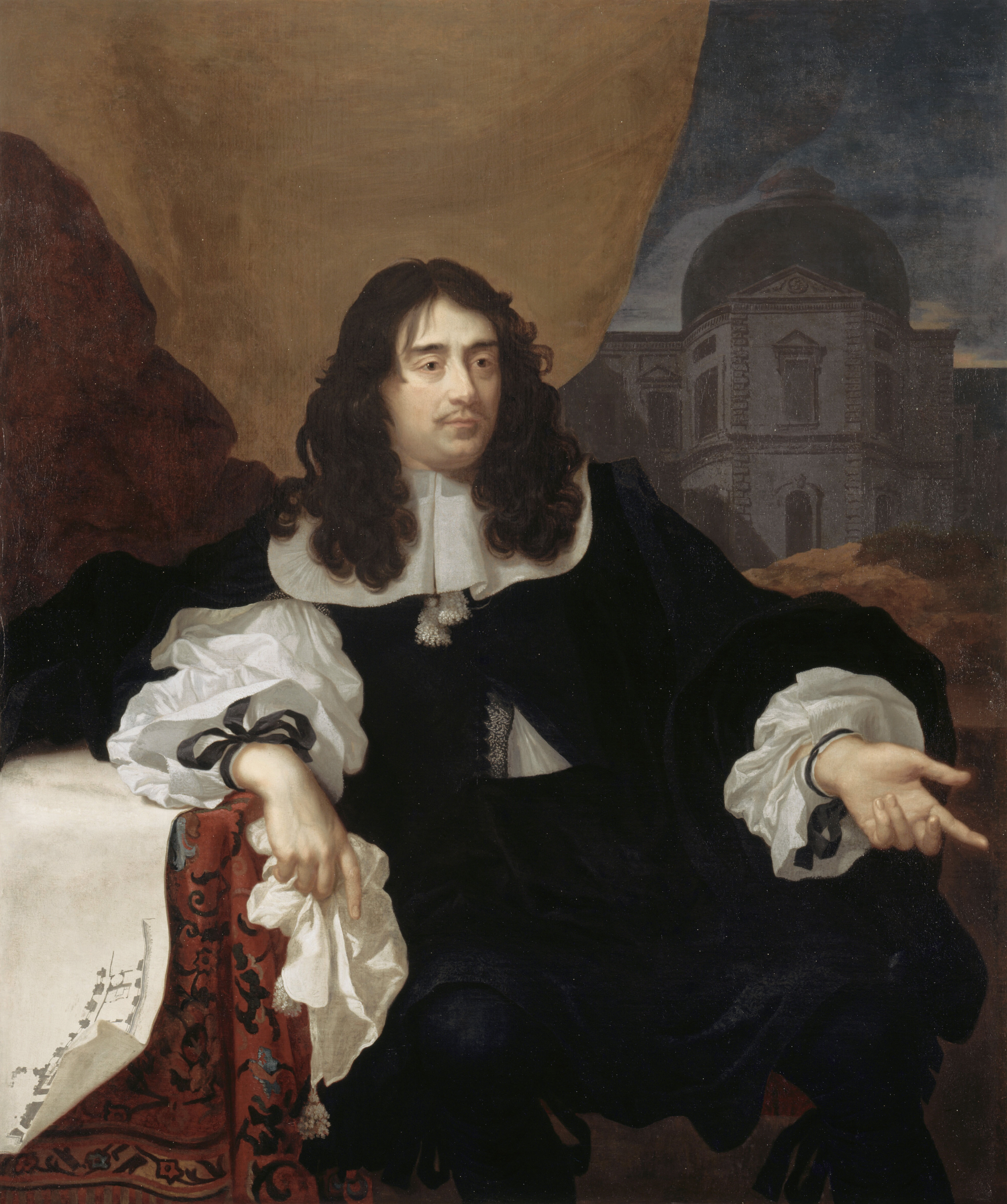
Possibly Pierre Rabon's 1660 reception piece, a portrait of Antoine de Ratabon (Château de Versailles)

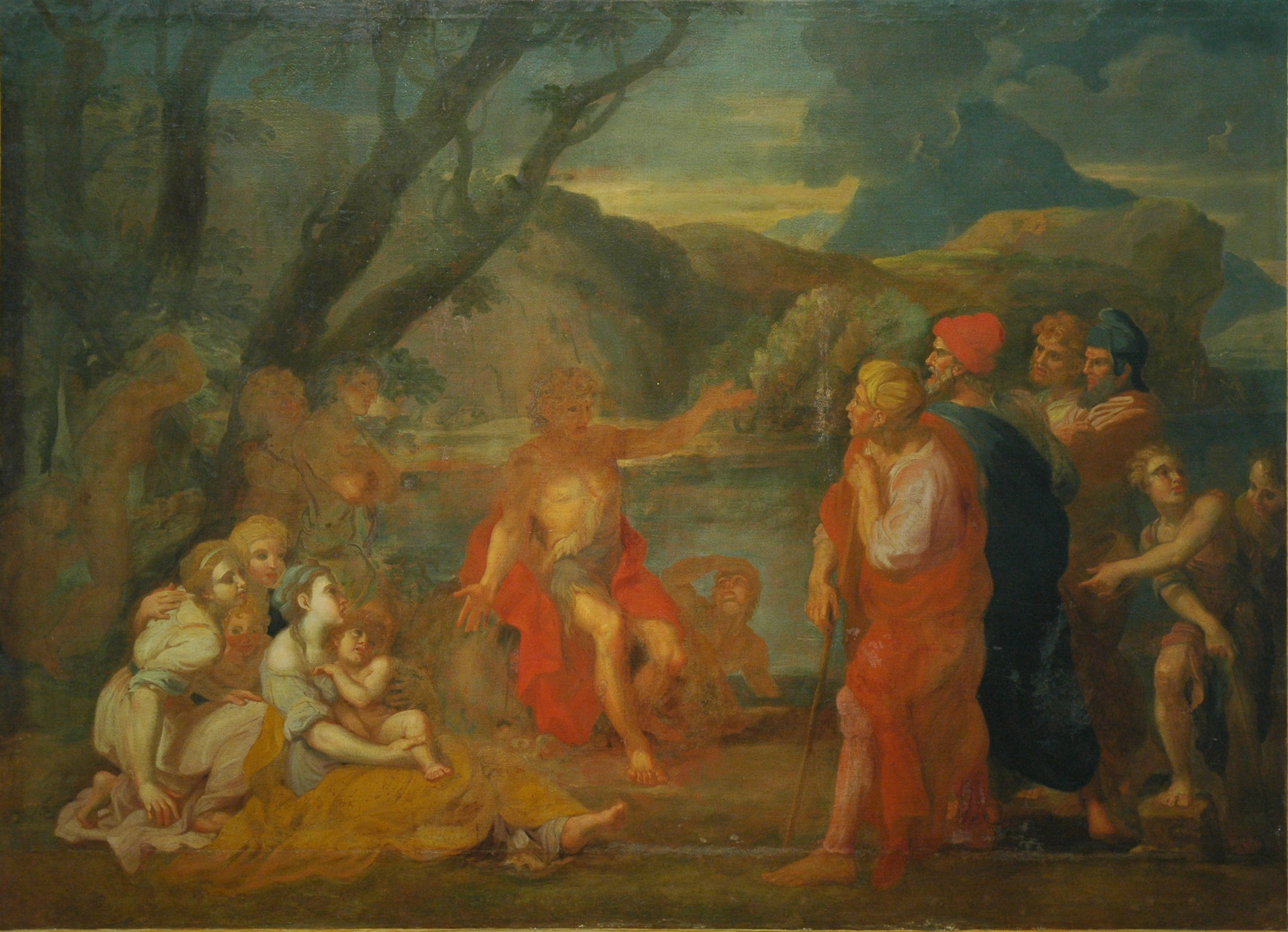
Saint John Preaching in the Desert, attributed to Pierre Rabon (Musée des Beaux-Arts, Carcassonne)

== Bibliography ==
- Bajou, Thierry (1998). La peinture à Versailles : XVIIe siècle. [English edition: Paintings at Versailles: XVIIth Century, translated by Elizabeth Wiles-Portier, p. 76.] Paris: Réunion des musées nationaux. ISBN 9782283017647. ISBN 9782283017654 (English edition).
- Ballon, Hilary (1999). Louis Le Vau: Mazarin's Collège, Colbert's Revenge. Princeton University Press. ISBN 9780691048956.
- Benezit Dictionary of Artists (2006), vol. 11, p. 575 ("Rabon, Pierre" and "Rabon, Nicolas"). Paris: Gründ. ISBN 9782700030709.
- Fontaine, André (1914). Académiciens d'autrefois. Paris: H. Laurens. Copy at Internet Archive.
- Hardouin, Christophe (1994). "La Collection de portraits de l'Académie royale de Peinture et de Sculpture: Peintures entrées sous le règne de Louis XIV (1648–1715", Mémoire de D.E.A., Université de Paris IV, 1994, pp. 164–166.
- Jal, Auguste (1872). "Rabon (Pierre), — (Nicolas)", pp. 1030–1031, in Dictionnaire critique de biographie et d'histoire, 2nd edition. Paris: Henri Plon. Title page at Gallica.
- Laprade, Albert (1955). "Portraits des premiers architectes de Versailles", Revue des Arts, March 1955, pp. 21–24. ISSN 0482-7872
- Laprade, Albert (1960). François d'Orbay: Architecte de Louis XIV. Paris: Éditions Vincent, Fréal. OCLC 562063179, 780531730, 1096782.
- Montaiglon, Anatole de (1875). Procès-verbaux de l'Académie royale de peinture et de sculpture, 1648-1793, Volume 1 (1648–1672). Paris: Charavay frères. Copy at Internet Archive.
- Montaiglon, Anatole de (1893). Descriptions de l'Académie royale de peinture et de sculpture par son secrétaire Nicolas Guérin et par Antoine-Nicolas Dézallier d'Argenville le fils (1715–1781). Paris: La Société de propagation des livres d'art. Copy at Gallica.
- Williams, Hannah (2015). Académie Royale: A History in Portraits. Farnham, Surrey: Ashgate. ISBN 9781409457428.
