= Antoine de Ratabon =

French aristocrat and architect

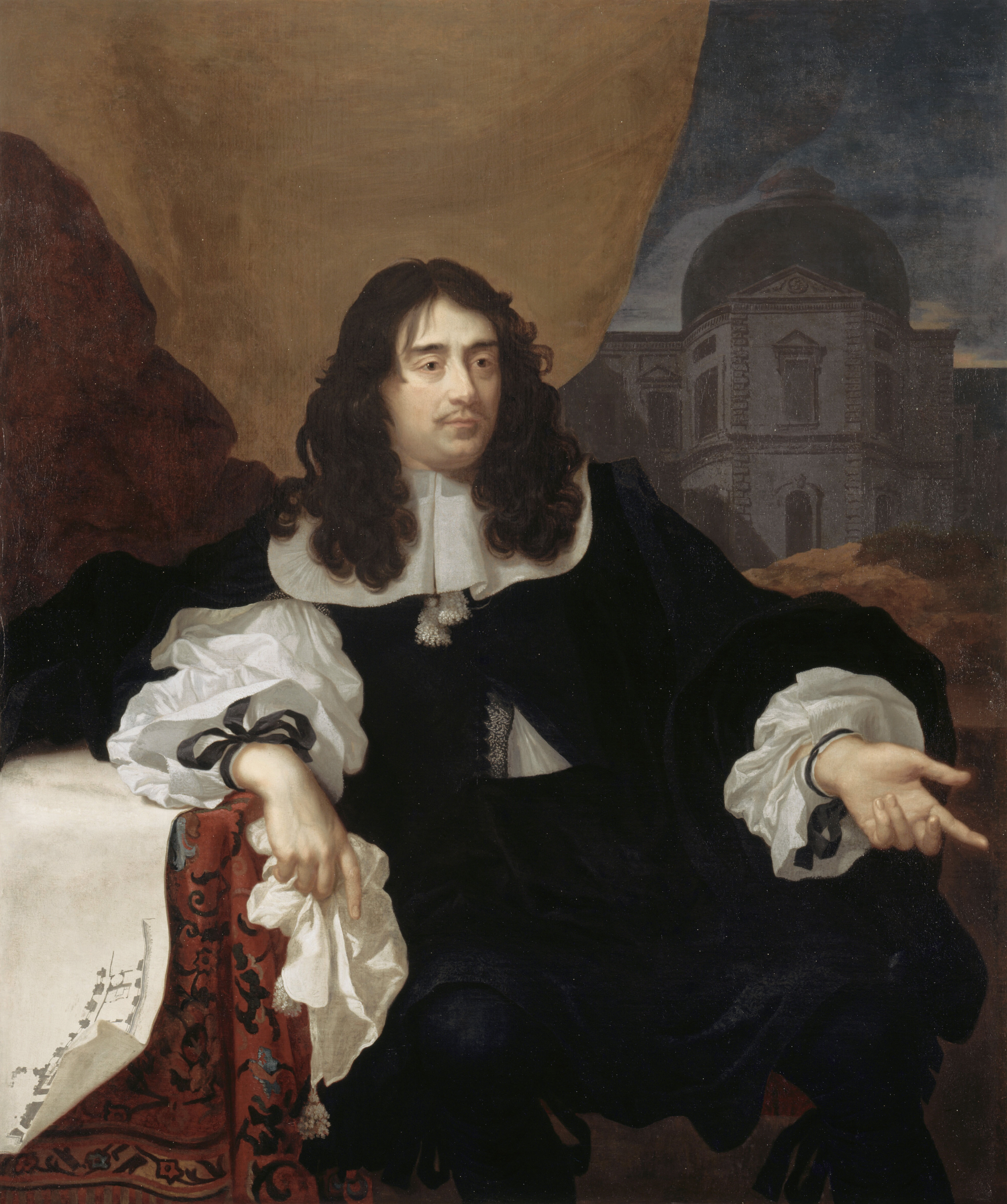
- Possible portrait of Antoine de Ratabon by Pierre Rabon (1660) (Note: The subject of this portrait was identified as Louis Le Vau in 1955 by Albert Laprade, who recognized the plan as that of the southwest corner of the old Louvre, that is the Bathing Apartment of the Queen Mother Anne d'Autriche, remodeled by Le Vau in the summer of 1661, and the building illustrated in the background as the pavilion at the north end of the Louvre's Petite Galerie, constructed after the fire of 1 February 1661 (see also Laprade 1960, chapter 3, plate 1). Christophe Hardouin disputed Laprade's attribution in an unpublished thesis for the University of Paris and identified the painting as Pierre Rabon's presentation piece before the Academy on 3 July 1660, which portrayed Antoine de Ratabon, Surintendant des Bâtiments (see Thierry Bajou; also Hilary Ballon 1999, p. 201, note 8, who was unable to examine the thesis but cites Bajou). Bajou comments that the "building plan and the facade therefore correspond to projects and not to completed buildings. It is unfortunately, just as impossible to confirm this identification, by comparing the sitter's features with those in other painted, sculpted or engraved portraits.")

Director of the Académie de Peinture et de Sculpture
- In office 1655–1670
- Monarch: Louis XIV
- Succeeded by: Charles Errard

Surintendant des Bâtiments du Roi
- In office 1656 – 1 January 1664
- Preceded by: Étienne Le Camus
- Succeeded by: Jean-Baptiste Colbert

Personal details
- Born: 1617 Montpellier, Languedoc, France
- Died: 12 March 1670 (aged 52–53) Paris, France
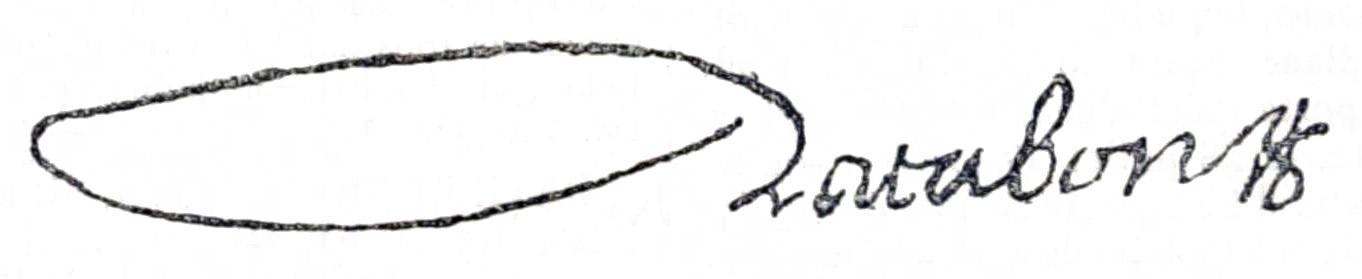
- Signature

Antoine de Ratabon (1617 – 12 March 1670) was a French aristocrat who served as an arts and architecture administrator during the reign of Louis XIV. He was the first Director of the Académie de Peinture et de Sculpture from 1655 to 1670 as well as the Surintendant des Bâtiments (Superintendent of Buildings) from 1656 to 1664.

== Early life and career ==
Ratabon was born in Montpellier, the son of Jean de Ratabon, an equerry, and Catherine Pache from Servien, near Mende. He became Maître d'Hôtel Ordinaire of King Louis XIV, Trésorier Général de France at Montpellier, and Intendant des Gabelles of Languedoc.

== Bâtiments du Roi ==
In Paris he became First Assistant to François Sublet de Noyers, who was the Surintendant des Bâtiments under Cardinal Richelieu, and continued in this role under Étienne Le Camus, who succeeded Sublet de Noyers as Surintendant after the latter's dismissal under Cardinal Mazarin in 1643. Ratabon succeeded Le Camus in 1656. Ratabon relinquished the post to Jean-Baptiste Colbert on 1 January 1664.

In his role as Surintendant des Bâtiments, Ratabon ordered the demolition of the Hôtel du Petit-Bourbon in October 1660 to make way for the eastward expansion of the Louvre and construction of the Louvre Colonnade. The order resulted in the eviction without warning of the troupe of Molière from the theatre of the Petit Bourbon and their transfer to the disused and run-down theatre of the Palais-Royal.

== Personal life ==
By a contract of 1 March 1647, Ratabon married Marie Sanguin, daughter of Nicolas Sanguin, an equerry and sieur de Pierrelaye. The eight-year-old Louis XIV, his mother Anne d'Autriche, and Cardinal Mazarin were all present and signed the contract. The couple had several children of which three survived into adulthood:

- Louis de Ratabon (died September 1693), seigneur de Trememont, Gentleman of the Chambre du Roi, Governor of Fécamp, and Special Envoy for the King to Liège, Venice and other foreign places.
- Marie-Marguerite de Ratabon (1652–1736), married Louis Verjus, Seigneur et Comte de Crécy, in 1676.
- Martin of Ratabon (1654–1728), Bishop of Ypres as well as Viviers

In 1664 Ratabon constructed a house, the Hôtel de Ratabon, to the designs of the architect Pierre Le Muet on a site on the western border of the garden of the Palais-Royal, now 10 rue de Richelieu in the 1st arrondissement of Paris. He died in this house in 1670. It was destroyed in 1873.

== Bibliography ==
- Bajou, Thierry (1998). La peinture à Versailles : XVIIe siècle. [English edition: Paintings at Versailles: XVIIth Century, translated by Elizabeth Wiles-Portier, p. 76.] Paris: Réunion des musées nationaux. ISBN 9782283017647. ISBN 9782283017654 (English edition).
- Ballon, Hilary (1999). Louis Le Vau: Mazarin's Collège, Colbert's Revenge. Princeton University Press. ISBN 9780691048956.
- Cojannot, Alexandre (2003). "Mazarin et le « Grand Dessein » du Louvre: Projets et réalisations de 1652 à 1664.", vol. 161, pp. 133–219, in Bibliothèque de l'École des Chartes. ISSN 0373-6237. OCLC 970023804.
- Gady, Alexandre (2008). Les Hôtels particuliers de Paris du Moyen Âge à la Belle Époque. Paris: Parigramme. ISBN 9782840962137.
- Gordan, Alden R. (1996). "Maison du Roi, II. Bâtiments du Roi", vol. 20, pp. 132–137, in The Dictionary of Art, 34 volumes, edited by Jane Turner. New York: Grove. ISBN 9781884446009.
- Hardouin, Christophe (1994). "La Collection de portraits de l'Académie royale de Peinture et de Sculpture: Peintures entrées sous le règne de Louis XIV (1648–1715", Mémoire de D.E.A., Université de Paris IV, 1994, pp. 164–166.
- Jal, Auguste (1872). "Ratabon (Antoine de)", p. 1042, in Dictionnaire critique de biographie et d'histoire, 2nd edition. Paris: Henri Plon.
- Laprade, Albert (1955). "Portraits des premiers architectes de Versailles", Revue des Arts, March 1955, pp. 21–24. ISSN 0482-7872
- Laprade, Albert (1960). François d'Orbay: Architecte de Louis XIV. Paris: Éditions Vincent, Fréal. OCLC 562063179, 780531730, 1096782.
- Michel, Christian (2018). The Académie Royale de Peinture et de Sculpture: The Birth of the French School, 1648–1793, translated from French by Chris Miller. Los Angeles: Getty Research Institute. ISBN 9781606065358.
- Vitu, Auguste-Charles-Joseph (1880). La Maison mortuaire de Molière d'apres des Documents inédits, avec Plans et Dessins. Paris: Alphonse Lemerre. Copy at HathiTrust. Copy at Gallica.
- Williams, Hannah (2015). Académie Royale: A History in Portraits. Farnham, Surrey: Ashgate. ISBN 9781409457428.
