= 17th-century French art =

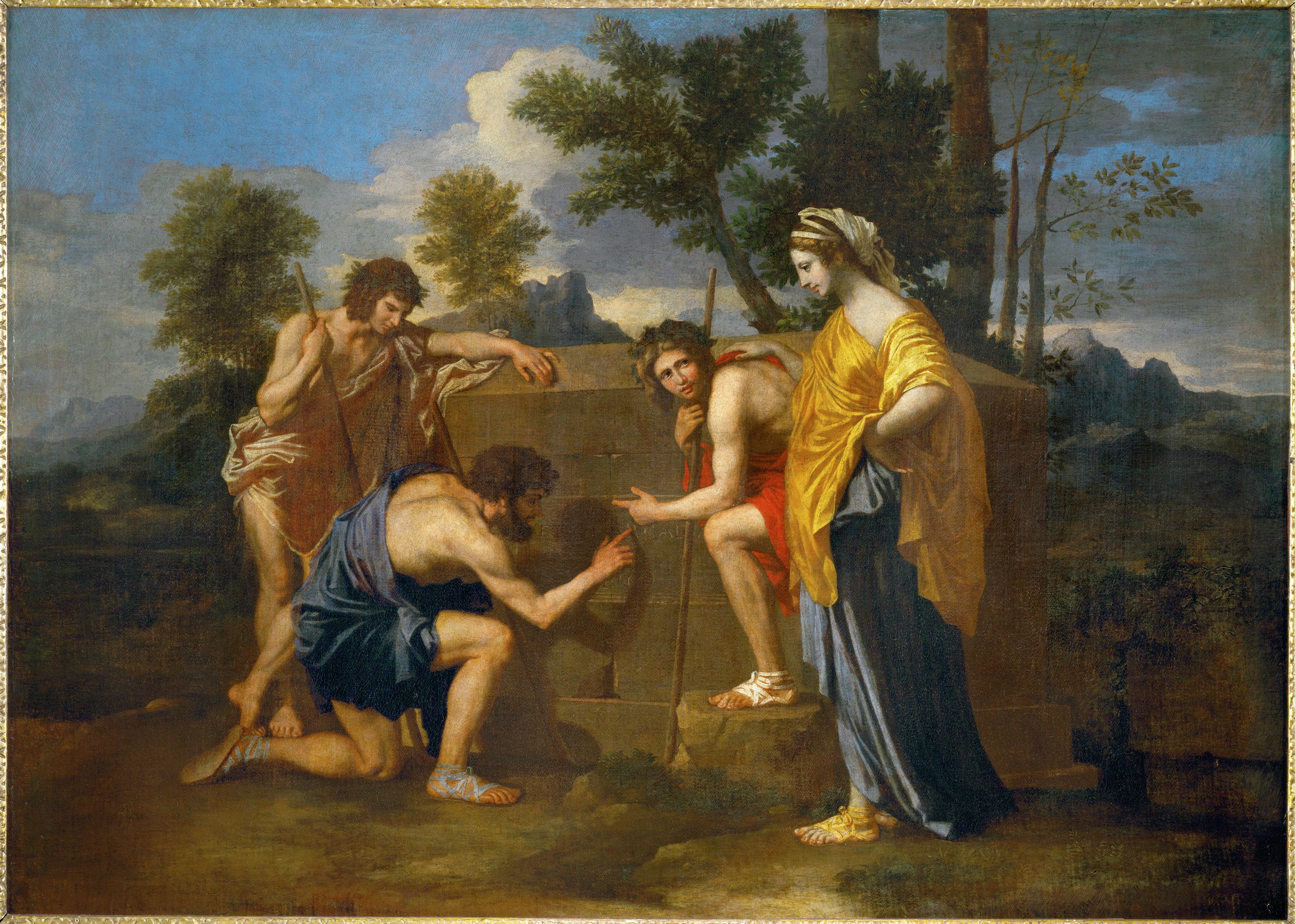
Et in Arcadia ego by Nicolas Poussin

17th-century French art is generally referred to as Baroque, but from the mid- to late 17th century, the style of French art shows a classical adherence to certain rules of proportion and sobriety uncharacteristic of the Baroque as it was practiced in most of the rest of Europe during the same period.

== Louis XIII style ==
In the early part of the 17th century, late mannerist and early Baroque tendencies continued to flourish in the court of Marie de' Medici and Louis XIII. Art from this period shows influences from both the north of Europe (Dutch and Flemish schools) and from Roman painters of the Counter-Reformation. Artists in France frequently debated the merits between Peter Paul Rubens (the Flemish Baroque, voluptuous lines and colors) and Nicolas Poussin (rational control, proportion, Roman classicism).

There was also a strong Caravaggio school represented in the period by the candle-lit paintings of Georges de La Tour. The wretched and the poor were featured in an almost Dutch manner in the paintings by the three Le Nain brothers. In the paintings of Philippe de Champaigne there are both propagandistic portraits of Louis XIII's minister Cardinal Richelieu and other more contemplative portraits of people in the Jansenist sect.

== Residential architecture ==
However, under Louis XIV, the Baroque as it was practiced in Italy was not in French taste (Bernini's famous proposal for redesigning the Louvre was rejected by Louis XIV.) Through propaganda, wars and great architectural works, Louis launched a vast program designed for the glorification of France and his name. The Palace of Versailles, initially a tiny hunting lodge built by his father, was transformed by Louis XIV into a marvelous palace for fêtes and parties. Architect Louis Le Vau, painter and designer Charles Le Brun and the landscape architect André Le Nôtre created marvels : fountains danced; wandering revelers discovered hidden grottos in the gardens.

The initial impetus for this transformation of Versailles is generally linked to the private château Vaux-le-Vicomte built for Louis XIV's minister of Finance Nicolas Fouquet. Having offered a lavish festival for the king in the newly finished residence in 1661 (Le Brun, Le Vau, Le Nôtre, the poet La Fontaine, the playwright Molière were all under Fouquet's patronage), the minister was accused of misappropriation of funds and was sentenced to life imprisonment. The architects and artists under his patronage were all put to work on Versailles.

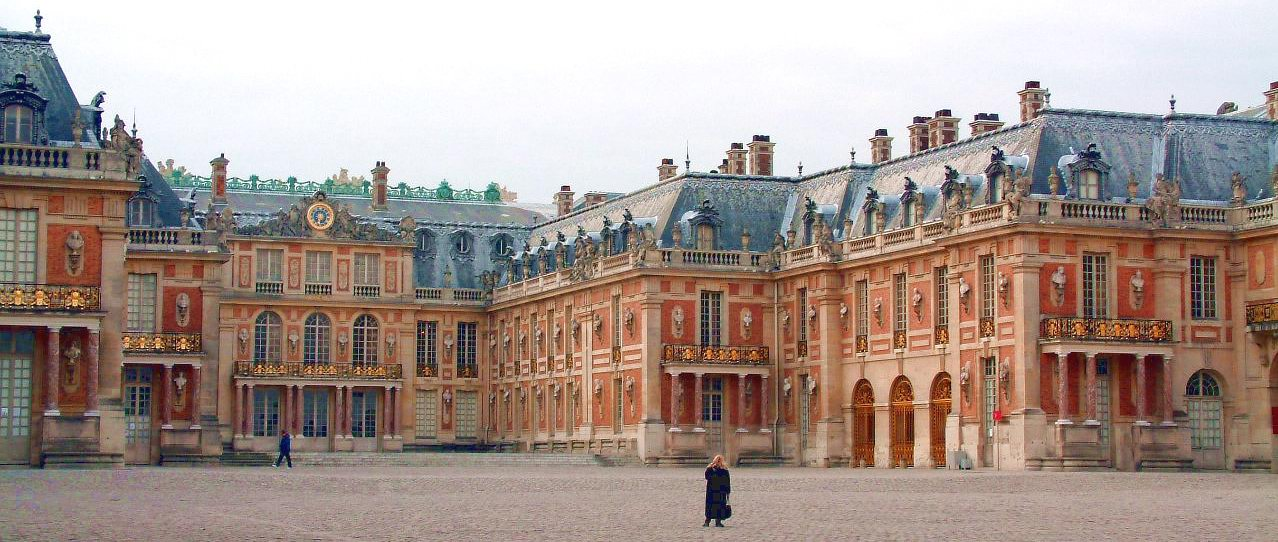
Versailles: Louis Le Vau's cour d'honneur

== The court of Louis XIV ==
In this period, Louis' minister Jean-Baptiste Colbert established royal control over artisanal production in France; henceforth France would no longer purchase luxury goods from abroad, but would, herself, set the standard for quality. This control was also seen in the creation of an academy of painting and sculpture, which maintained a hierarchy of genres in painting (the "noblest," according to André Félibien in 1667, being history painting), a strong use of pictorial rhetoric, and a strict sense of decorum in subject matter.

Furnishings and interior designs from this period are referred to as "Louis XIV style"; the style is characterized by weighty brocades of red and gold, thickly gilded plaster molding, large sculpted sideboards, and heavy marbling.

In 1682, Versailles was transformed into the official residence of the king; eventually the Hall of Mirrors was built; other smaller châteaux, like the Grand Trianon, were built on the grounds, and a huge canal featuring gondolas and gondoliers from Venice was created.

Through his wars and the glory of Versailles, Louis became, to a certain degree, the arbiter of taste and power in Europe and both his château and the etiquette in Versailles were copied by the other European courts. Yet the difficult wars at the end of his long reign and the religious problems created by the revocation of the Edict of Nantes made his last years dark ones.

== See also ==
- French artists of the seventeenth century
- French Baroque architecture
- Baroque painting
- French Baroque music
- Classicism
- Louvre Colonnade
- Louis XIV style
- Louis XV style
