= Louvre Colonnade =

East façade of the Palais du Louvre

Coordinates: 48°51′36.59″N 2°20′22.71″E

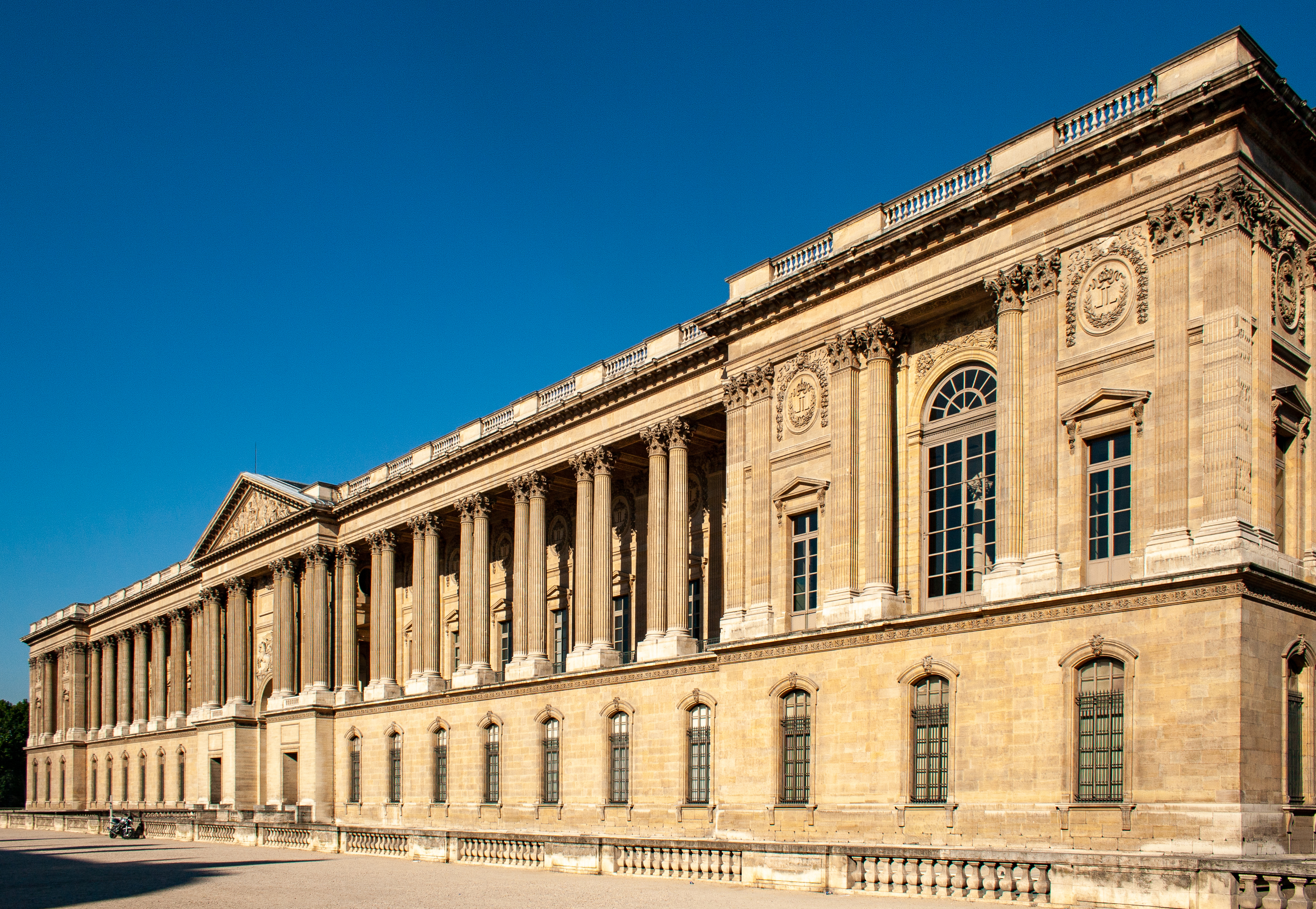
The Louvre Colonnade

The Louvre Colonnade is the easternmost façade of the Louvre Palace in Paris. It has been celebrated as the foremost masterpiece of French architectural classicism since its construction, mostly between 1667 and 1674. The design, dominated by two loggias with trabeated colonnades of coupled giant columns, was created by a committee of three, the Petit Conseil, consisting of Louis Le Vau, Charles Le Brun, and Claude Perrault. Louis Le Vau's brother, François Le Vau, also contributed. Cast in a restrained classicizing baroque manner, it interprets rules laid down by the ancient Roman architect Vitruvius, whose works Perrault translated into French (1673). Its flat-roofline design, previously associated with Italy and unprecedented in France, was immensely influential.

== Description ==
Little that could be called Baroque can be identified in the Colonnade's cool classicism that looks back to the 16th century. The use of one central and two terminal pavilions is typically French, while the main entrance, a pedimented avant-corps, resembles a triumphal arch or temple front. The simple character of the ground floor basement sets off the paired Corinthian columns, modeled strictly according to Vitruvius, against a shadowed void. This scheme of coupled columns on a high podium goes back as far as Bramante's House of Raphael (1512). The effect of the Colonnade has been likened to that of an ancient Roman temple whose elevations have "been flattened, as it were, into a single plane." Crowned by an uncompromising Italian balustrade along its distinctly non-French flat roof, the whole ensemble represents a ground-breaking departure in French architecture.

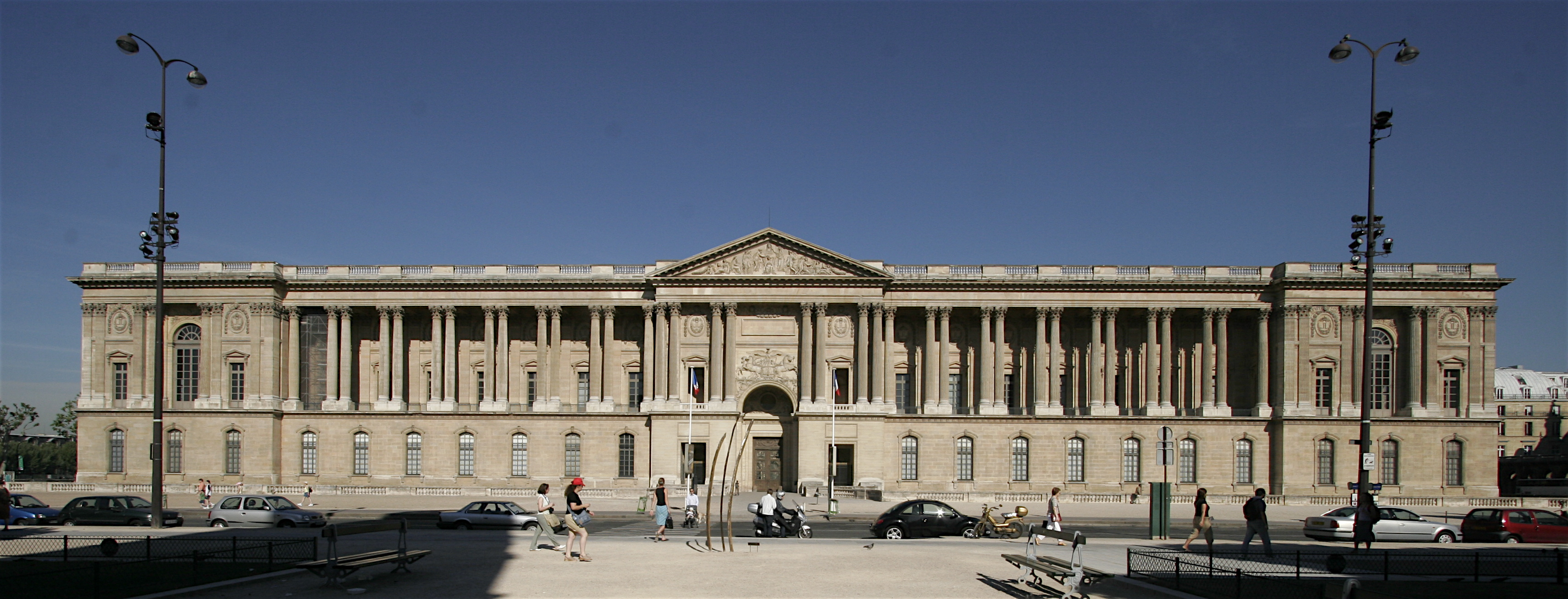
The 183-metre long east façade in 2005

== History of the design ==
Louis Le Vau, the King's First Architect at the time of the death of Cardinal Mazarin in 1661, completed the south wing of the Louvre's Cour Carrée in 1663. He had already started designing the east wing around 1659 and by late 1663 began laying the foundation.

On 1 January 1664, Jean-Baptiste Colbert purchased the post of Surintendant des Bâtiments du Roi from Antoine de Ratabon and suddenly halted all work on the east wing. He invited other French architects to submit designs, in effect starting a competition. He later extended his invitation to four Roman architects, including Pietro da Cortona and Gian Lorenzo Bernini, and sent them Le Vau's designs. Among the French projects submitted at that time were two of special interest: one (lost) shown anonymously by Claude Perrault, a physician and scientist, and one by François Le Vau, Louis Le Vau's younger brother and an accomplished architect in his own right.

Nevertheless, Colbert selected Bernini based on two preliminary projects and invited him to Paris to further revise and complete his designs. Bernini arrived in June 1665 and stayed until late October. During his stay he sculpted a portrait bust of Louis XIV, which is now in the Salon of Diana at the Palace of Versailles. Bernini's design for the Louvre was very Italianate and ambitious, encompassing the entire building rather than just the east wing. The foundation cornerstone was laid at a royal ceremony a few days before Bernini left for Rome.

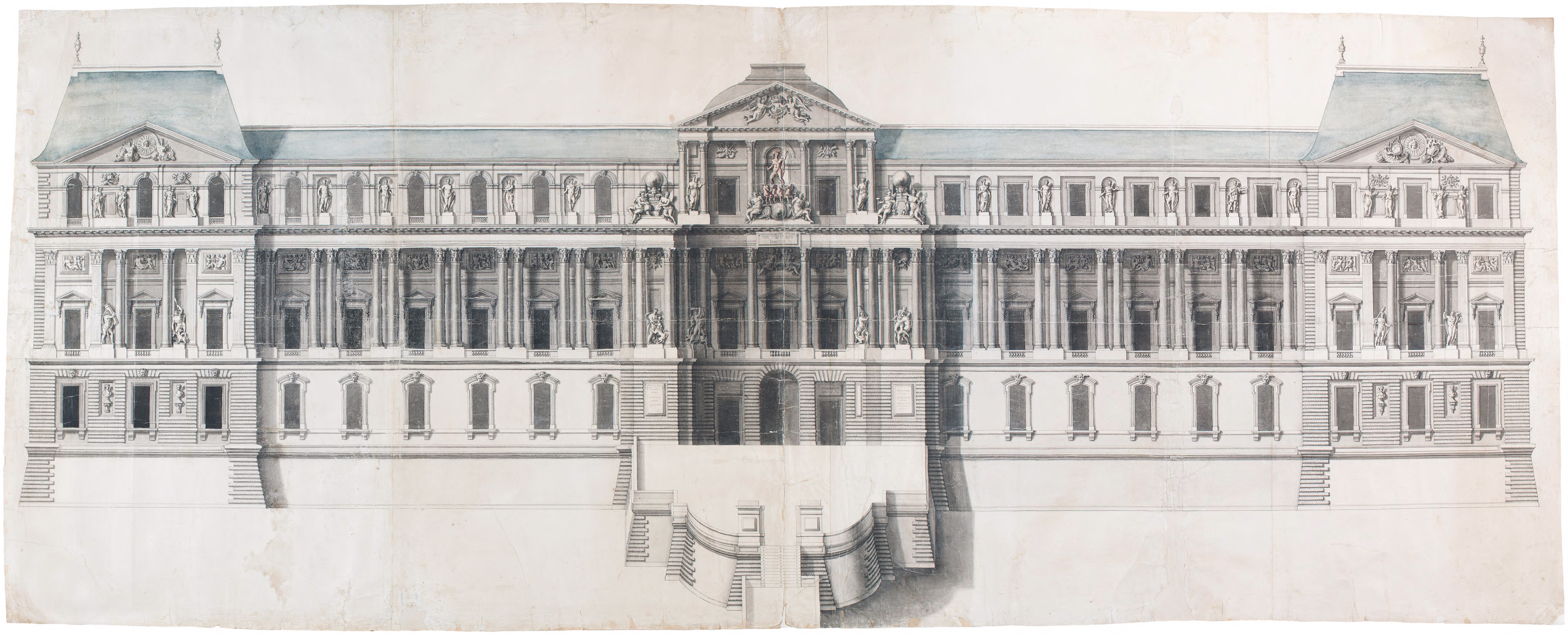
Drawing by François Le Vau, which may be his proposal of 1664

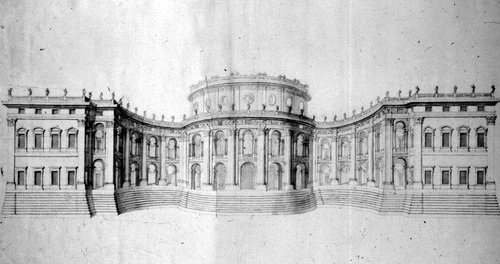
Bernini's first project (1664), drawing, Musée du Louvre

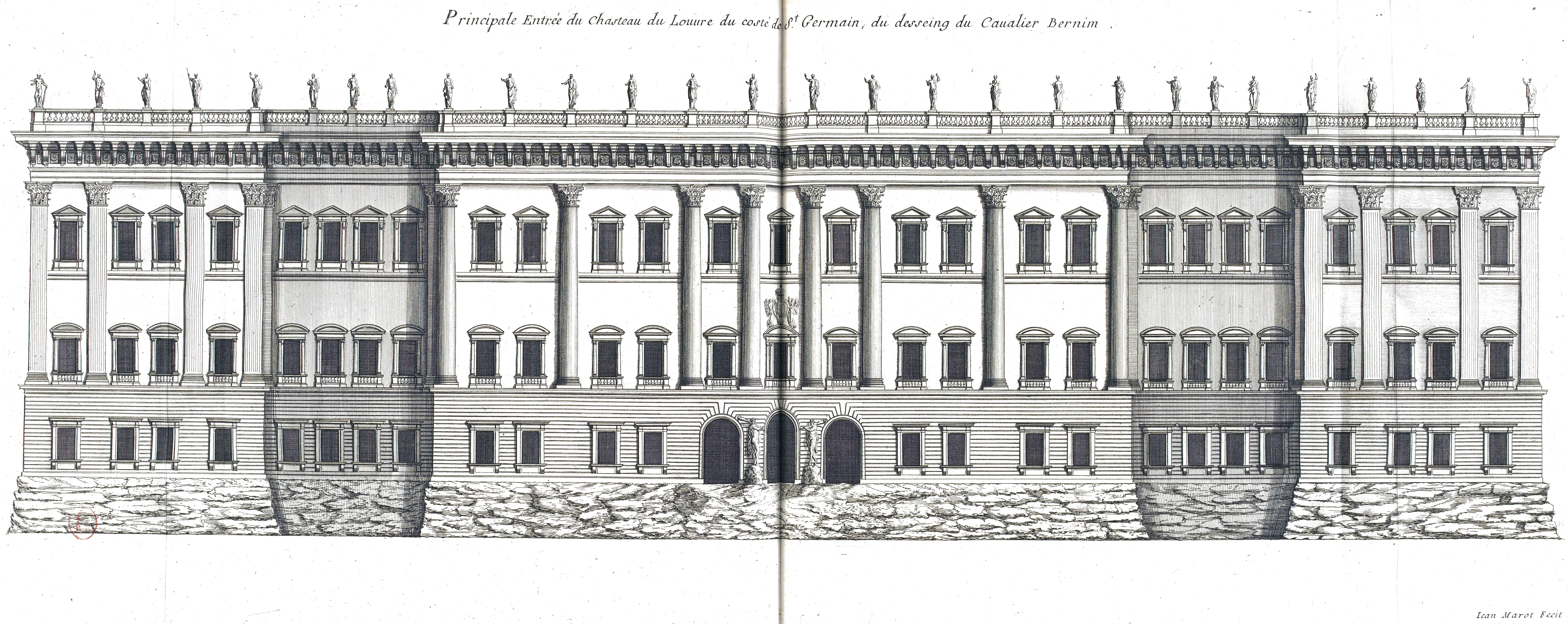
Bernini's third project (1665), engraved by Jean Marot

Bernini's plans were not well received by French architects, who objected and eventually won the upper hand. In April 1667, Colbert, with the king's approval, appointed Louis Le Vau, Charles Le Brun, and Claude Perrault to a committee, the Petit Conseil, to prepare new designs. Charles Perrault, Claude Perrault's younger brother and Colbert's chief assistant, acted as the secretary of the committee and probably wrote the Registre ou Journal des déliberations..., which records the activities of the committee during April and May 1667. The Registre begins by describing Colbert's dissatisfaction with the French and Italian projects and his decision to create a committee "to allow for mutual consultation." Le Vau, Le Brun, and Perrault are instructed to work together "unanimously and conjointly on all designs for the construction of the Palais du Louvre, so the designs will be regarded as the work of the three equally, and for conservation of good collaboration, none should spoil by claiming to be the particular author to the detriment of the others."

After several meetings, the Petit Conseil drew up two schemes, and, according to the Registre, "one was adorned with an order of columns forming a peristyle or gallery above the first floor [i.e., the ground floor], and the other was simpler and more unified, without an order of columns". The architects of the designs were not identified. On 14 May, at the royal Château de Saint-Germain-en-Laye, two paintings of the proposals were shown to Louis XIV, who chose the design with the colonnade. In July 1667 Colbert finally informed Bernini that his plans had been abandoned. The new façade was begun that summer and was mostly complete in 1674, when the stones of the central pediment were hoisted into place.

The authorship of the Colonnade's design has remained controversial ever since. Le Vau may have been responsible for the use of the colonnade, possibly based on the 1664 design of his brother François, which employed paired, free-standing columns. A change in the order from Composite to Corinthian may have been due to the influence of Roland Fréart de Chambray, who was called to Paris to become a member of the Petit Conseil in 1668. At some point that same year the decision was made to double the width of the south wing. This resulted in the widening and redesign of both the south and north pavilions of the east façade. Perrault probably became the main designer in 1668 and was responsible for the final design.

The severely designed colonnade overlooking the Place du Louvre — for which buildings including the Hôtel du Petit-Bourbon were demolished to provide the necessary urban space — became widely celebrated.

The pediment sculpture of 'Minerva surrounded by the Muses of Victory crowning the bust of Napoleon' is by François-Frédéric Lemot (1808–1810). Napoleon was later replaced by Louis XIV, although the face was kept.

Engraving of the east façade from Blondel's Architecture françoise, 1756

== Interior ==
Between 1807 and 1811, Percier and Fontaine created monumental staircases at the southern and northern ends of the wing behind the Colonnade, and projected a suite of prestige rooms between the two staircases on the first floor. The architectural sculpture of the southern staircase (Escalier du Midi) were created in the early 1810s by François Gérard, Auguste Marie Taunay, Augustin Félix Fortin, and Charles Antoine Callamard.

== Digging out of the moat ==
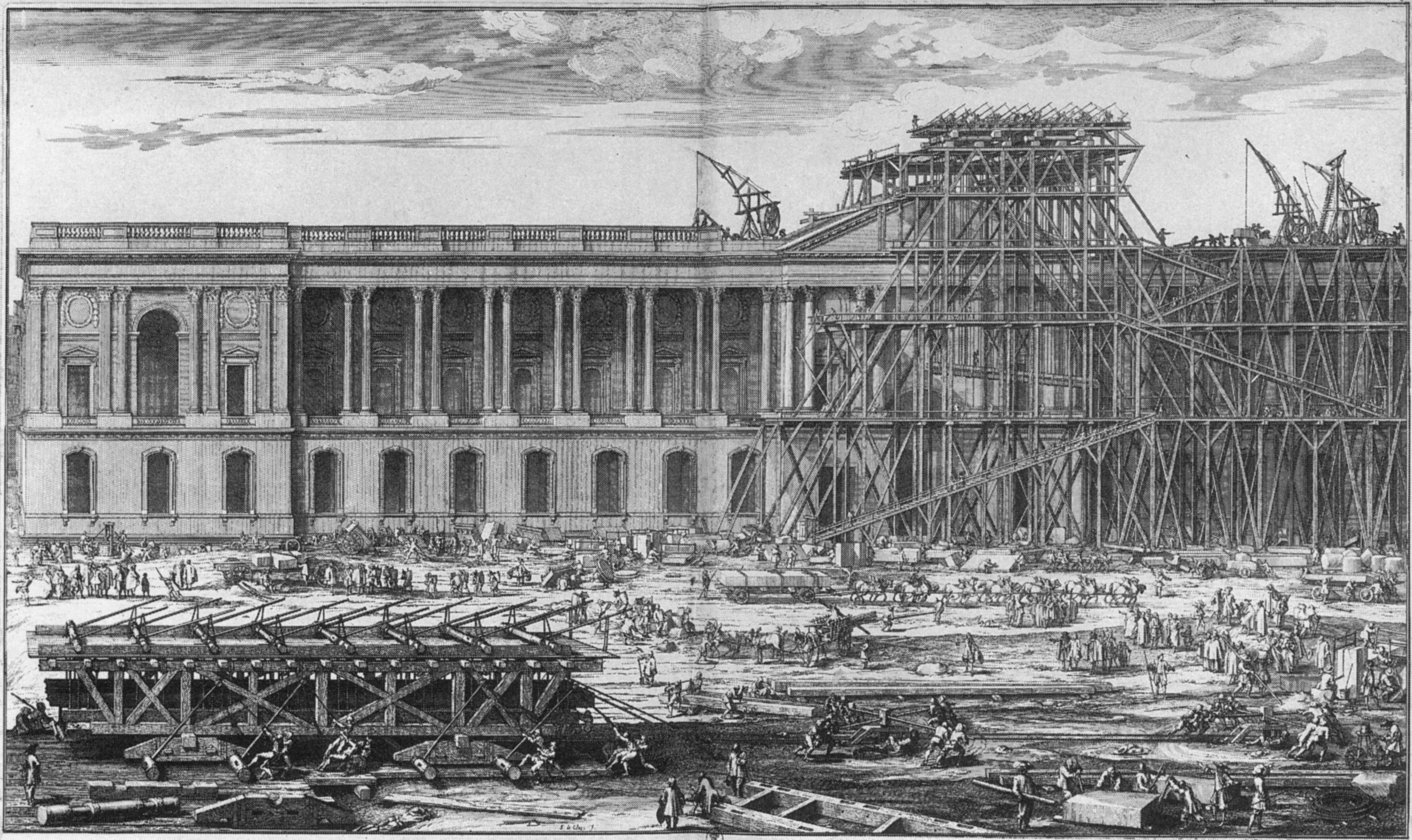
The lifting of the Louvre pediment stones, 1674, engraving by Sébastien Leclerc

In 1964, the French Minister of Culture, André Malraux, ordered the digging out of the dry moat in front of the Colonnade. A characteristic feature of pre-classical French architecture, it is shown in nearly every project and early drawing of the east façade, and its reexcavation revealed the original soubassement, or podium (see the engraving from Blondel's book). The moat may have been filled in around 1674 to facilitate construction (see the engraving by Sébastien Leclerc) and not restored due to lack of funds to build the contrescarpe after Louis XIV's attention shifted to the Palace of Versailles. However, in 1981 Germain Bazin argued that the reconstruction of the moat was misguided, since for aesthetic reasons Louis XIV had never wanted it.

== Influence ==
For centuries, the Colonnade has provided a model for many grand edifices in Europe and America:

- In Paris, Ange-Jacques Gabriel's buildings on the Place de la Concorde (1755–1775) and the principal façade of Charles Garnier's Opéra (1860–1875)
- The central part of the East and West Fronts of the United States Capitol (1792–1811) in Washington, D.C.
- The Cannon House Office Building in Washington, D.C.
- The Raczyński Library (1822–1828) in Poznań
- The Metropolitan Museum (1874) in New York City
- The original Pennsylvania Station (1910) in New York City
- War Memorial Opera House (1932), San Francisco, California, USA

== See also ==
- Quai du Louvre

== Bibliography ==
- Ayers, Andrew (2004). The Architecture of Paris. Stuttgart; London: Edition Axel Menges. ISBN 9783930698967.
- Bazin, Germain (1981). "L'erreur du fossé du Louvre". Le Monde, 20 August 1981, p. 2.
- Berger, Robert W. (1993). The Palace of the Sun: The Louvre of Louis XIV. University Park: The Pennsylvania State University Press. ISBN 9780271008479.
- Berger, Robert W. (1994). A Royal Passion: Louis XIV as Patron of Architecture. Cambridge: Cambridge University Press. ISBN 0521440297.
- Blunt, Anthony (1953). Art and Architecture in France 1500 to 1700. Harmondsworth, Middlesex: Penguin Books. OCLC 1019966574.
- Blunt, Anthony (1999). Art and Architecture in France, 1500–1700, fifth edition revised by Richard Beresford. New Haven: Yale University Press. ISBN 9780300077353. ISBN 9780300077483 (paperback).
- Bottineau-Fuchs, Yves (1996). "Paris, V. Buildings, 6. Palais du Louvre, (ii) Post-medieval", vol. 24, pp. 161–163, in The Dictionary of Art, edited by Jane Turner, reprinted with minor corrections in 1998. New York: Grove. ISBN 9781884446009.
- Burchard, Wolf (2016). The Sovereign Artist: Charles Le Brun and the Image of Louis XIV. London: Paul Holbertonn Publishing. ISBN 9781911300052.
- Cojannot, Alexandre (2003). "Claude Perrault et le Louvre de Louis XIV. À propos de deux livres récents," Bulletin Monumental, vol. 161, no. 3, pp. 231–239.
- Feldmann, Dietrich (1996). "Le Vau: (2) François Le Vau", vol. 19, pp. 267–268, in The Dictionary of Art, 34 volumes, edited by Jane Turner. New York: Grove. ISBN 9781884446009.
- Gargiani, Roberto (1998). Idea e costruzione del Louvre. Parigi cruciale nella storia dell'architettura moderna europea. Florence: Alinea. ISBN 8881252538.
- Laprade, Albert (1960). François d'Orbay: Architecte de Louis XIV. Paris: Éditions Vincent, Fréal. OCLC 562063179, 780531730, 1096782.
- Neuman, Robert (2013). Baroque and Rococo Art and Architecture. Boston: Pearson. ISBN 9780205832262.
- Pérouse de Montclos, Jean-Marie (1989). Histoire de l'architecture française. De la Renaissance à la Révolution. Paris: Mengès. ISBN 2856203000.
- Petzet, Michael (2000). Claude Perrault und die Architektur des Sonnenkönigs. Der Louvre König Ludwigs XIV. und das Werk Claude Perraults. Munich/Berlin: Deutscher Kunstverlag. ISBN 3422062645.
- Preimesberger, Rudolf; Mezzatesta, Michael P. (1996). "Bernini. Gianlorenzo Bernini", vol. 3, pp. 828–840, in The Dictionary of Art, edited by Jane Turner, reprinted with minor corrections in 1998. New York: Grove. ISBN 9781884446009.
- Summerson, John (1963). The Classical Language of Architecture. Cambridge, Massachusetts: The MIT Press. ISBN 9780262690126.
- Sutcliffe, Anthony (1993). Paris: An Architectural History. New Haven and London: Yale University Press. ISBN 0300054459.
- Tadgell, Christopher (1980). "Claude Perrault, François Le Vau and the Louvre Colonnade", The Burlington Magazine, vol. 122, no. 926 (May 1980), pp. 326–337.
- Whiteley, Mary; Braham, Allan (1969). "Les soubassements de l'aile orientale du Louvre". Revue de l'art, vol. 1, no. 4, pp. 30–43.
- Wischermann, Heinfried (1997). Paris: An Architectural Guide. Venice: Arsenale Editrice. ISBN 8877431628.
