= Pierre Le Muet =

French architect (1591–1669)

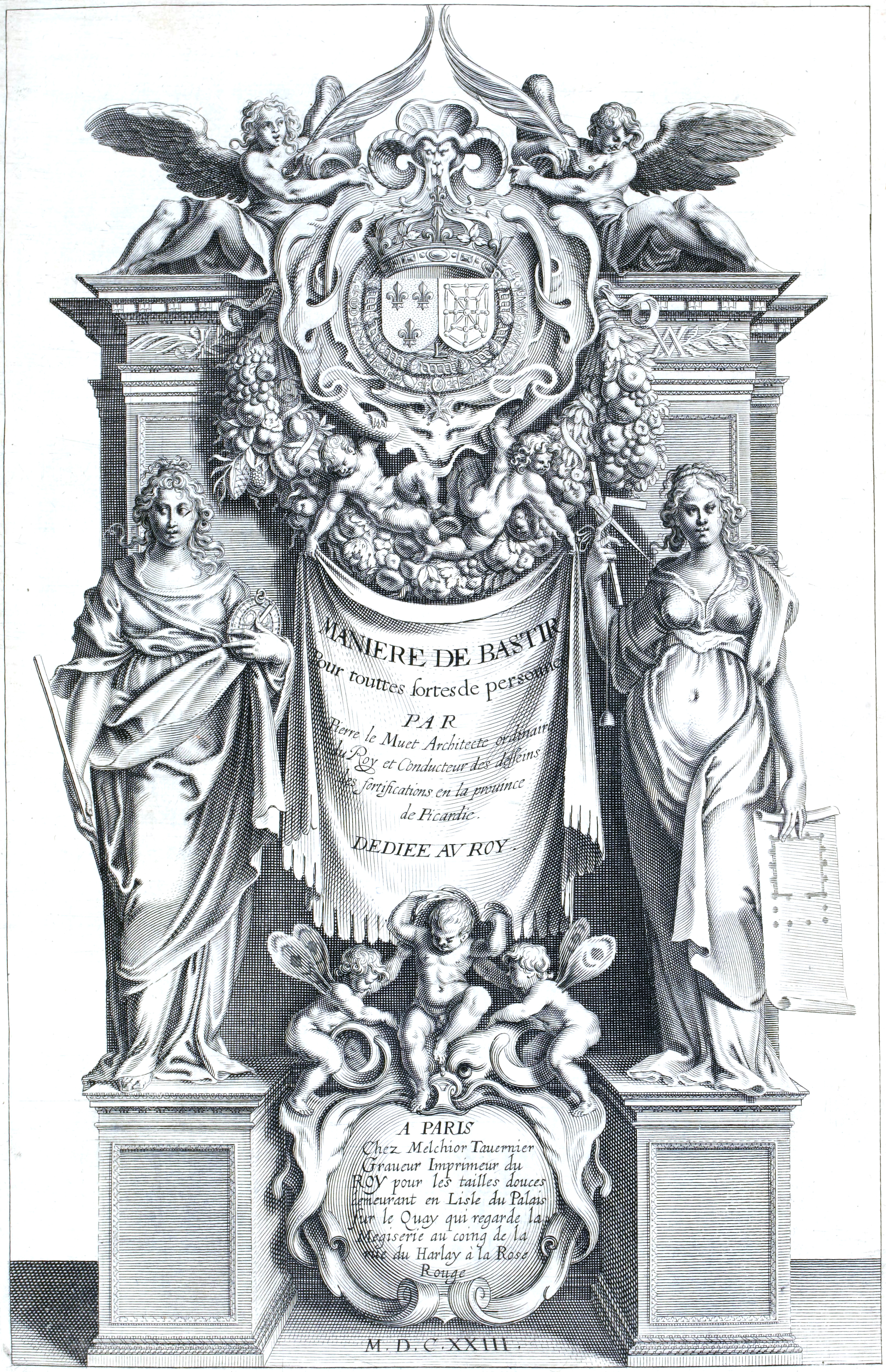
Title page of Le Muet's Manière de bâtir, 1623

Pierre Le Muet (French pronunciation: [pjɛʁ lə mɥɛ]; 7 October 1591 – 28 September 1669) was a French architect, military engineer, and writer, famous for his book Manière de bâtir pour toutes sortes de personnes (1623 and 1647), and for the châteaux he constructed, most notably Tanlay in Burgundy, as well as some modest houses in Paris, the grandest of which, the Hôtel d'Avaux (1644–1650) survives and has recently been restored to a semblance of its seventeenth-century condition.

== Early life and career ==
Le Muet was born in Dijon. His father, Philippe Le Muet, was a guardsman in the artillery corps of Burgundy. Pierre Le Muet is mentioned as Architecte Ordinaire du Roi in 1616, when he was paid for a model of the Palais du Luxembourg. From 1617 to about 1637, he was a military engineer. In this capacity he accompanied the royal armies in the south of France. There are surviving plans of fortifications in Picardie (dated 1631, now in the Bibliothèque Arsenal in Paris) and documentation of work in Péronne and Corbie, Somme (1635–1638). There is also a ground-floor plan of Notre-Dame-des-Victoires in Paris, work on which was interrupted at an early stage.

From the available evidence, he was mostly active in this period as a theorist and publisher, producing in 1623 the first edition of his Manière de bâtir, a collection of models for town houses in the Parisian mode, designed to occupy eleven lots from the simplest most constricted plot of urban land to hôtels particuliers of middling importance. Claude Mignot points out that Le Muet's model in this enterprise was Sebastiano Serlio, whose sixth book, Architettura, degli habitationi de tutti li gradi degli huomini was already circulating in France in manuscript. The enlarged second edition of Manière (1647) added a second volume of Augmentations de nouveaux bastimens. Its engraved illustrations mark the earliest appearance of Jean Marot as an engraver of architectural designs.

In 1631 Le Muet married Marie Autissier, daughter of Jean Autissier, one of the leading building contractors of the time. This brought Le Muet closer to the social milieu of his architect contemporaries Jacques Le Mercier, François Mansart, and Louis Le Vau.

In 1631–1632, Le Muet published a French translation of Vignola's Regola delle cinque ordini d'architectura, from a four-language Dutch edition of 1619. Le Muet's version includes ten previously unpublished designs for doors. He also published a French adaptation (1645) of Paladio's First Book of Architecture, which in 1650 was succeeded by a more faithful and complete version by Fréart de Chambray.

Manière de bâtir with his Augmentations was republished by Jean De Puis in 1663–1664 and François Jollain in 1681, and in London a translation was published by Robert Pricke, The Art of Sound Building (1670).

== Later career as an architect ==
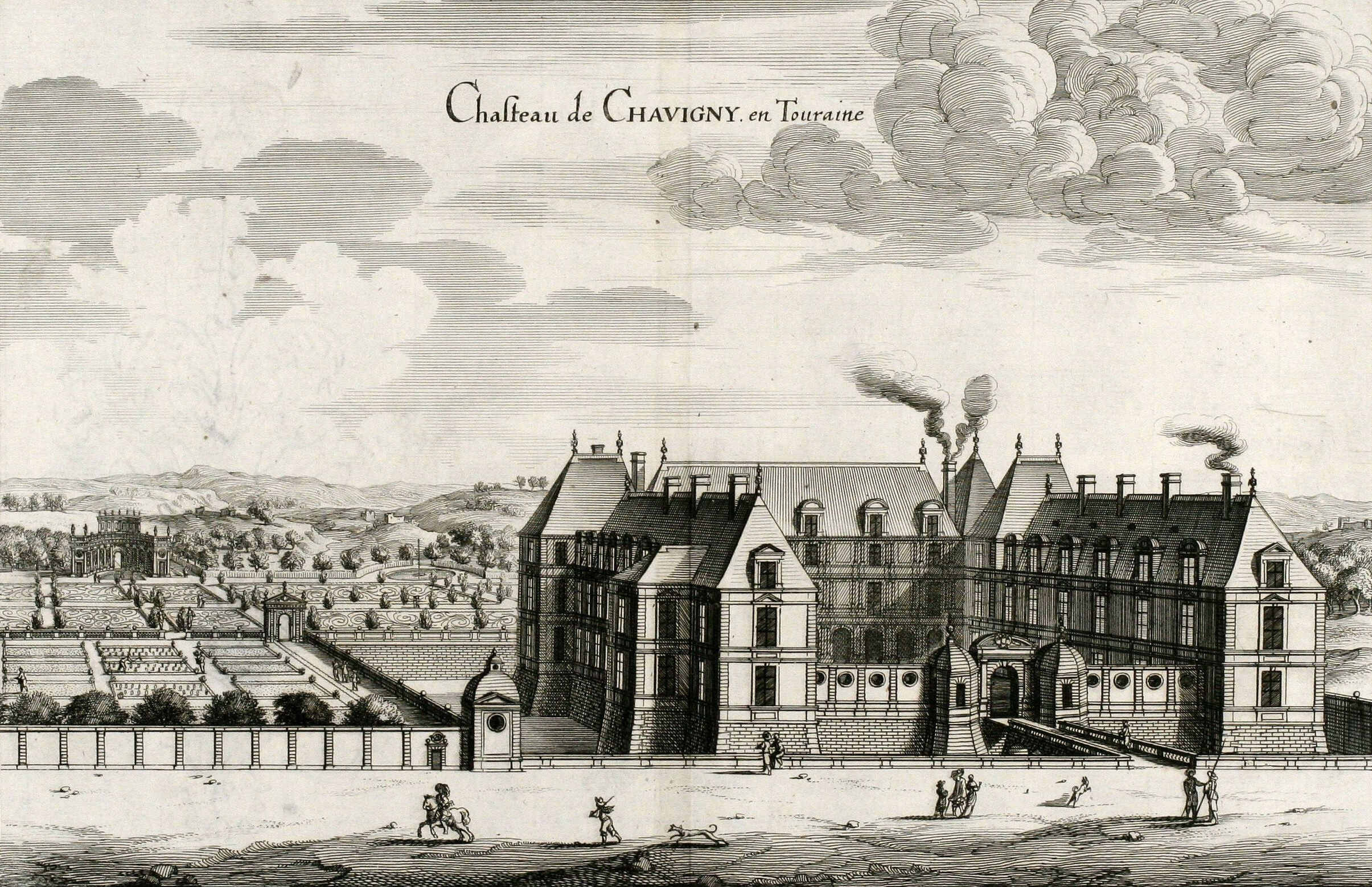
Chateau de Chavigny

Beginning in 1637 Le Muet produced designs for several châteaux, including: Chavigny (1637–1645; mostly destroyed 1833) in Lerné for Claude Bouthillier and his son Léon Bouthillier, comte de Chavigny; the Château de Pont-sur-Seine (1638–1644; destroyed 1814) for Claude Bouthillier; and the Château de Tanlay (1642–1645) for Michel Particelli d'Émery. At Tanlay he completed the part of the château begun in the 16th century in its original style, but added a vestibule-atrium in a more contemporary taste.

The additional designs in the 1647 edition of Maniere also show Le Muet the builder of three Parisian residences, the maison Tubeuf, and the hôtels Coquet and d'Avaux (1644–50). The engraver Marot worked from drawings furnished by Le Muet which corrected some irregularities demanded by exigencies of the actual sites, regularizing the court at Tanlay, for instance or giving an elevation and section never executed at the hôtel d'Avaux.

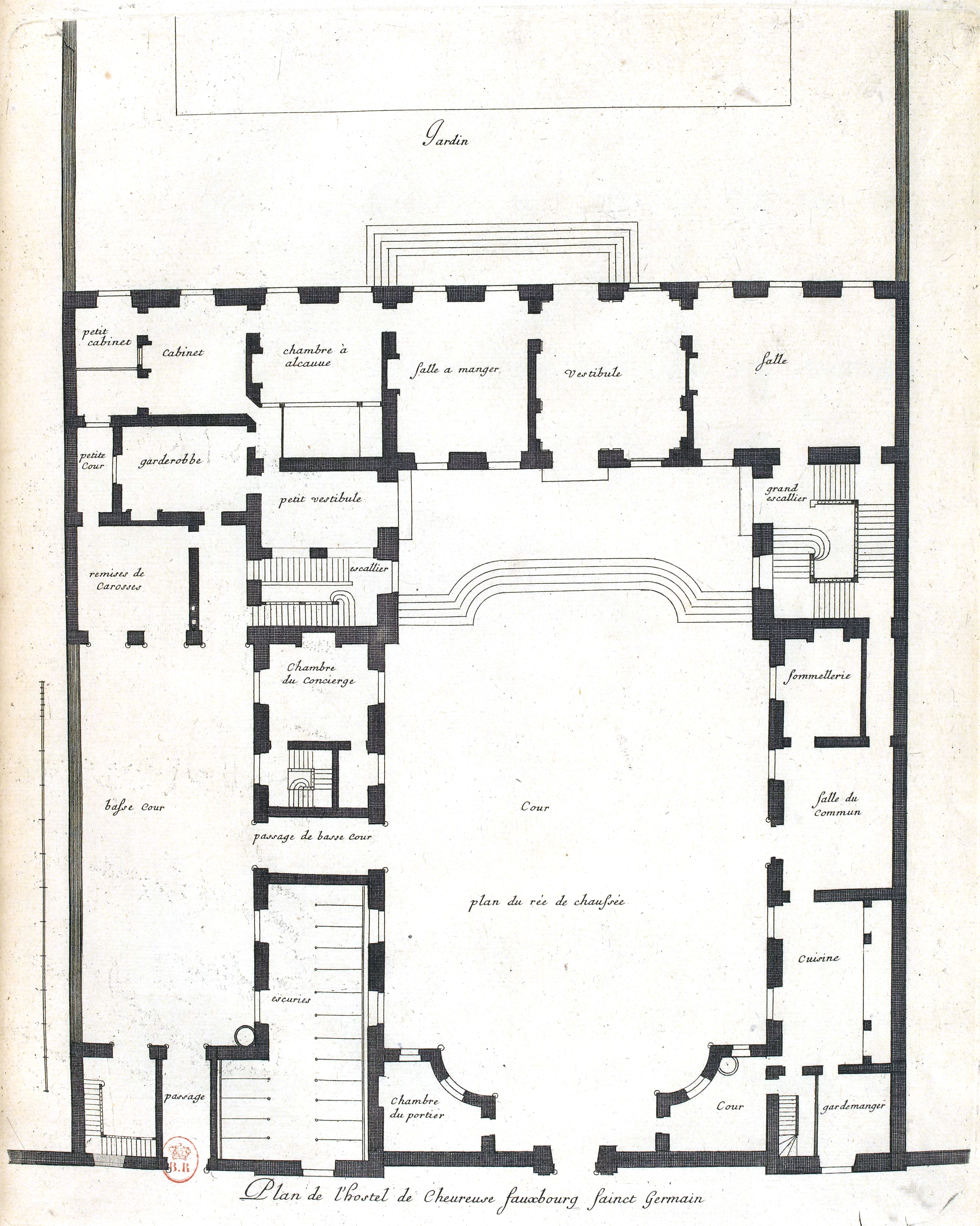
Plan of the Hôtel de Chevreuse

Le Muet, who remained faithful to the principle of linear room arrangements, constructed several more town houses, including the Hôtel de Chevreuse for Marie de Rohan-Montbazon, duchesse de Chevreuse, in 1660, and the Hôtel de Ratabon for Antoine de Ratabon in 1664. His designs for town houses were less inventive than those of Louis Le Vau, but more classically correct.

== See also ==
Architecture of Paris Other French architects of the first half of the 17th century:

- Salomon de Brosse
- Liberal Bruant
- Jacques Lemercier
- Louis Le Vau
- François Mansart
- Clément Métezeau
