= Étienne Le Camus (Surintendant des Bâtiments) =

Surintendant des Bâtiments (1648–1656)

Surintendant des Bâtiments du Roi
- In office 1648–1656
- Monarch: Louis XIV
- Preceded by: Cardinal Mazarin
- Succeeded by: Antoine de Ratabon

Personal details
- Died: 1673

Étienne Le Camus (died 1673) was a French administrative office holder: Maître des Comptes at Grenoble, then Surintendant des Bâtiments from 1648 to 1656. He was the son of a very rich man, Nicolas Le Camus (died 1648), who married Marie Colbert (died 1642), a first cousin to the father of Jean-Baptiste Colbert. Étienne's oldest brother, also named Nicolas Le Camus, was the father of the future cardinal Étienne Le Camus. Other brothers included Antoine Le Camus, who became president of the Chambre des Comptes, and Édouard Le Camus, who became a priest of the Oratoire and commissioned Charles Le Brun to decorate the Church of the Carmelites in the Rue Saint-Jacques. One of his sisters, Marie Le Camus (died 1678), married Michel Particelli d'Hémery, surintendant des finances.

== Bibliography ==
- Gordan, Alden R. (1996). "Maison du Roi, II. Bâtiments du Roi", vol. 20, pp. 132–137, in The Dictionary of Art, 34 volumes, edited by Jane Turner. New York: Grove. ISBN 9781884446009.
- Michel, Christian (2018). The Académie Royale de Peinture et de Sculpture: The Birth of the French School, 1648–1793, translated from French by Chris Miller. Los Angeles: Getty Research Institute. ISBN 9781606065358.
- Moréri, Louis (1692). Le Grand Dictionnaire historique, sixth edition, volume 2. Utrecht: François Halma and Guillaume vander Water. Leiden: Pierre vander Aa. Amsterdam: Pierre Mortier. Copy at Google Books.
- Olson, Todd P. (2002). Poussin and France: Painting, Humanism, and the Politics of Style. New Haven, Connecticut: Yale University Press. ISBN 9780300093384.
