= Roland Fréart de Chambray =

French writer, collector, and theorist

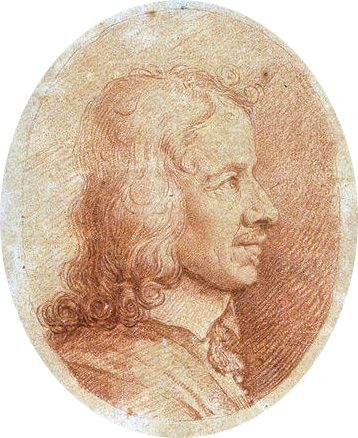
Portrait of Roland Fréart de Chambray by Charles Errard

Roland Fréart, sieur de Chambray (13 July 1606 – 11 December 1676) was a French writer, collector, and a theorist of architecture and the arts. Though not a practitioner himself, his two major publications, Parallèle de l'architecture antique avec la moderne (1650) and Idée de la perfection de la peinture (1662), appeared at a time when French architects were struggling to apply a new sense of discipline and order to the practice of building.

== Early life and trips to Italy ==
Roland Fréart was born in Le Mans, France. In 1630 he travelled to Italy, returning to France in 1635. While in Rome he studied architecture and met the collector Cassiano dal Pozzo and the painter Nicolas Poussin, as well as the artists Charles Errard and Jacques Stella.

Roland and his brother (Paul Fréart, sieur de Chantelou, or possibly Jean Fréart, sieur de Chantelou) were sent to Rome in 1639 and 1640, commissioned by their cousin François Sublet de Noyers, the superintendent of the Bâtiments du Roi, to secure the services of Poussin ("the best French artist in Rome") and to arrange for casts and copies to be made of the best antiquities in Roman collections, for the French royal palaces. Poussin arrived in Paris (with Chantelou) in December 1640. Casts of bas-reliefs sent back to Paris found use in the decor of the ceiling compartments in the Grande Galerie of the Palais du Louvre. There were also seventy casts from reliefs of sections of Trajan's Column.

Chantelou returned to Italy in 1643, with projects to cast the colossal horsemen of the Quirinal in bronze for the main entrance to the Louvre, but the death of Cardinal Richelieu, the disgrace of Sublet de Noyers and the death of King Louis XIII (1642–43) brought these ambitious projects to naught.

== Writings ==
Fréart de Chambray completed a translation of the full text of Andrea Palladio's Quattro Libri (Venice 1570) into French for the first time. An earlier publication of the first book only, by Pierre Le Muet (1645), had made a very free translation, adjusted to conform to French practice; it proved popular and was freely pirated in the following decades. Publication of Fréart's translation, completed about 1641, which had also been commissioned by his cousin Sublet de Noyers, was delayed as Sublet de Noyers was first disgraced (1643), then died in 1645. Following a stay in Rome, Fréart published it in Paris in 1650. Its "Dédicace à ses frères" is an open letter to his brother connoisseurs and patrons, hoping "to banish this capricious and monstrous fashion of building that some moderns have unhappily introduced as a heresy in the art, by I know not what licentiousness against its precepts and Reason itself". Fréart substitutes his elegant and literate dedication for Palladio's original dedication, and reprints the woodcuts from the Venice edition, which he had brought to Paris for the express purpose.

The same year, 1650, he published an anthology of ten ancient and modern writers on the classical orders, his Parallèle de l’architecture antique avec la moderne, which marked the first complete translation of Vitruvius into French and upheld the superiority of the Ancients over the Moderns, a polemic that was to erupt in the following decades into a virtual culture war. In his preface, Fréart de Chambray argues that the Classical orders (the Doric, the Ionic, and Corinthian) which he assigns to Greek precedents, are perfect models for all architecture; he condemns the "Roman orders" (the Tuscan and the Composite) as corrupt. Citing the use of the Corinthian order in the Temple of Solomon, he declares it to be the ‘flower of Architecture and the Order of Orders'. To Fréart de Chambray, who illustrated his text with copious engravings, Vitruvius and his translators were beyond reproach.

His Parallèle was translated into English— the translator was the distinguished connoisseur John Evelyn— as A parallel of the antient architecture with the modern: in a collection of ten principal authors who have written upon the five orders ... (London: "Printed by Tho. Roycroft for John Place") 1664.

In 1651, he put his excellent command of Italian and his connoisseurship to good use in a translation of Leonardo da Vinci's Trattato della pittura. His Idée de la perfection de la peinture appeared in 1662, providing a text that was fundamental to French academic painting into the following century.

== Bibliography ==
- Asfour, Amal (1996). "Fréart. (1) Roland Fréart" in Turner 1996, vol. 11, pp. 743–744. Also at Oxford Art Online (subscription required).
- Blunt, Anthony (1967). Nicolas Poussin. London: Palas-Athene. ISBN 9781873429648.
- Bull, Malcolm (1996). "Fréart. (2) Paul Fréart" in Turner 1996, vol. 11, p. 744. Also at Oxford Art Online (subscription required).
- Dauvois, Daniel (2008). "Fréart, Roland", vol. 1, pp. 505–506, in The Dictionary of Seventeenth-Century French Philosophers, edited by Luc Foisneau. London: Continuum. ISBN 9780826418616.
- Fréart de Chambray, Roland (1723). A Parallel of the Antient Architecture with the Modern (translated from French to English by John Evelyn, 3rd edition). London: Dan Brown, John Walthoe, Benjamin & Samuel Tooke, Daniel Midwinter, William Mears & Francis Clay. Copy at Google Books.
- Fréart de Chambray, Roland (2005). Parallèle de l'architecture antique avec la moderne; (suivi de) Idée de la perfection de la peinture, introduced and edited by Frédérique Lemerle-Pauwels and Milovan Stanic. Paris: École nationale supérieure des beaux-arts. ISBN 9782840561552.
- Haskell, Francis; Penny, Nicholas (1981). Taste and the Antique: The Lure of Antique Sculpture 1500-1900. New Haven: Yale University Press. ISBN 9780300026412.
- Lemerle, Frédérique (2006). Commentary on Roland Fréart's edition of Les quatre livres de l’architecture d’André Palladio.... Architectura website.
- Turner, Jane, editor (1996). The Dictionary of Art, 34 volumes, reprinted with minor corrections in 1998. New York: Grove. ISBN 9781884446009.
