= Hôtel de Ratabon =

Coordinates: 48.86421°N 2.3362°E

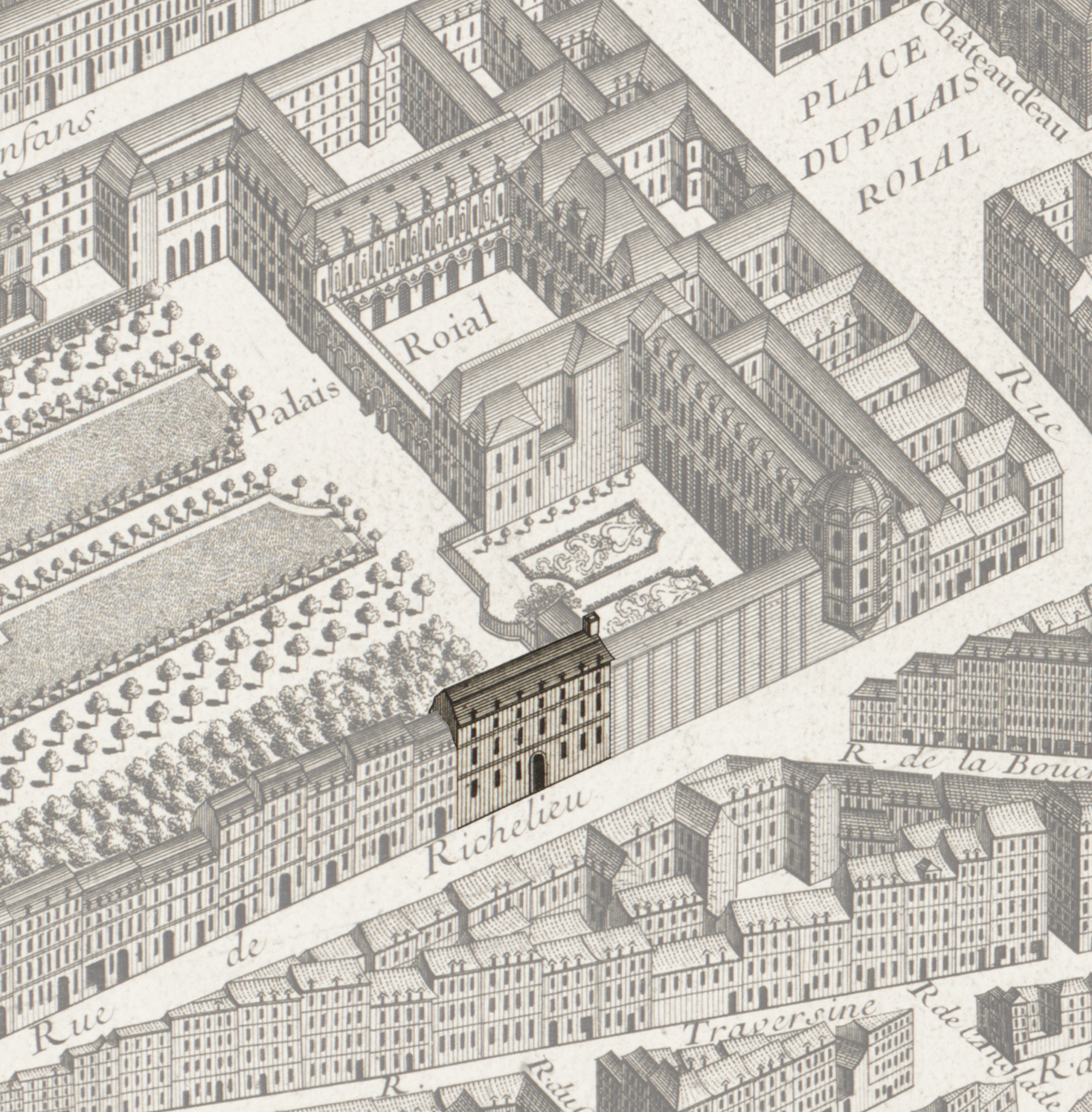
The Hôtel de Ratabon on the Turgot map of Paris (1739)

The Hôtel de Ratabon was a Parisian hôtel particulier, constructed in 1664 to the designs of the architect Pierre Le Muet for the French government official Antoine de Ratabon. It was located on a site, which at the time was between the western border of the garden of the Palais-Royal and the rue de Richelieu and is now at 10 rue de Richelieu in the 1st arrondissement of Paris. Antoine de Ratabon died in his house in 1670. It was destroyed in 1873.

== Documentation ==
In 1880 Auguste Vitu identified Antoine de Ratabon as the first known inhabitant of the house, as well as its probable constructor, and traced its subsequent ownership. In 1930 Maurice Dumolin included the lot on which it was built as part of his description of the subdivision of the land surrounding the garden of the Palais-Royal and states that the lot was given to Ratabon by Louis XIV on 25 September 1660, that Ratabon commissioned Pierre Le Muet to design the house, and that it was inherited by his widow, Marie Sanguin, in 1670. In 1991 French architectural historian Claude Mignot reported that two engravings by Jean Marot of an unspecified hôtel particulier actually represent a project of Pierre Le Muet for the house, and in 1994 Richard Beresford discovered an inventory, prepared after the death of Ratabon's widow, which provides a partial description of the house.

== Description ==
There were three floors: a ground floor with services, a main floor for living, and an attic floor under the roof. The plan was U-shaped, with the main wing along the rue de Richelieu and two lateral wings enclosing an interior courtyard to the rear with a wall between the courtyard and the garden of the Palais-Royal. The wall was no more than a single-storey high, thus the main floor had views of the garden of the Palais-Royal. The street entrance could accommodate carriages (porte-cochère) and opened into a passageway leading to the interior courtyard with the stables to the right of the courtyard at the rear. On the right side of the passageway were some steps (perron) leading up to a large columned vestibule with a grand staircase (escalier d'honneur) going up to the main floor, where there was a large hall with windows on the left overlooking the street and windows on the right, the courtyard. Based on the plan, there was a fireplace on the far wall with doors on either side leading to a large bedchamber. The latter had a doorway on the right leading to the left lateral wing with the landing of a smaller staircase and a private suite beyond. The right lateral wing was not visited by the notary.

Pierre Le Muet's designs, engraved by Jean Marot

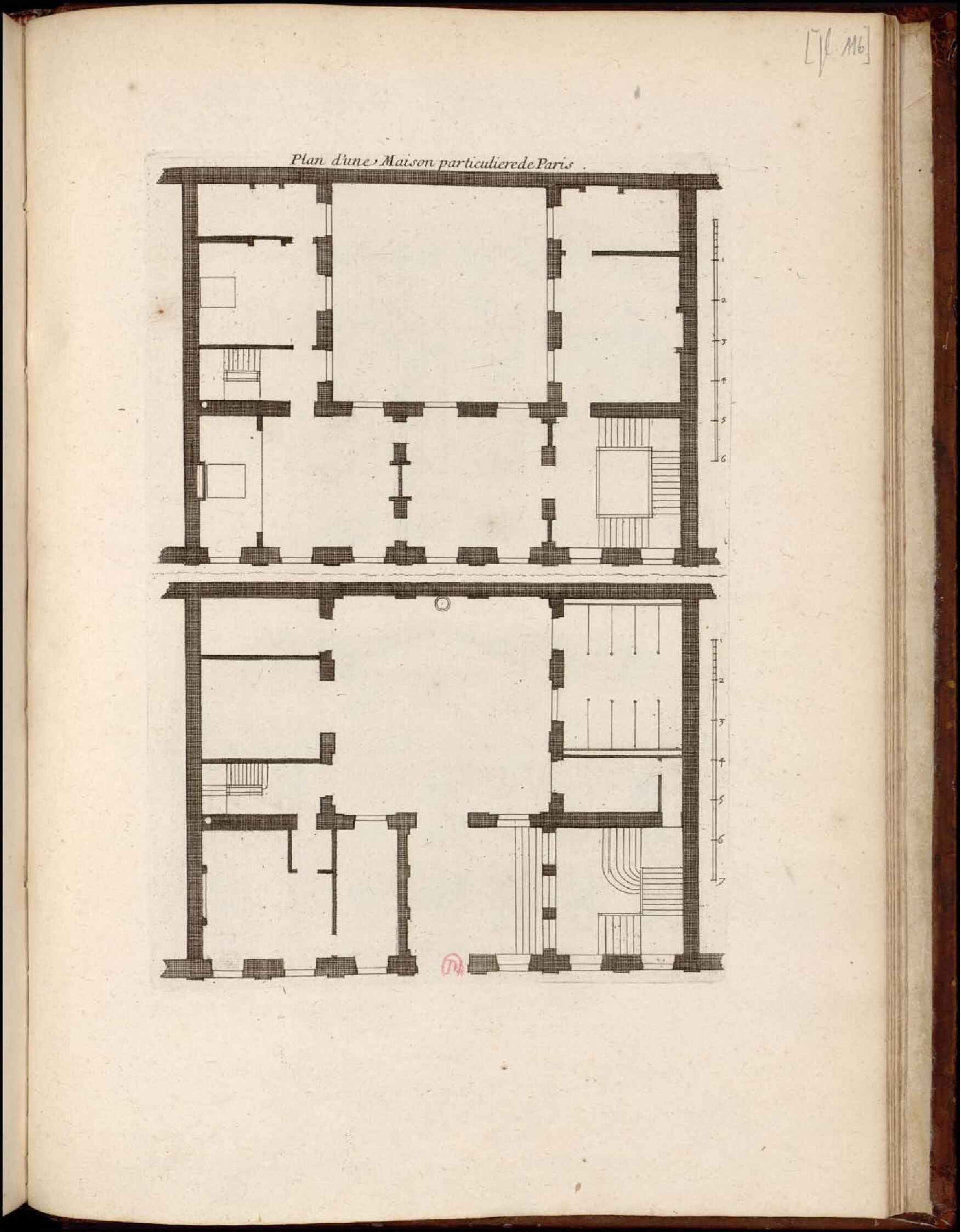
Plan of the main floor (above) and the ground floor (below)

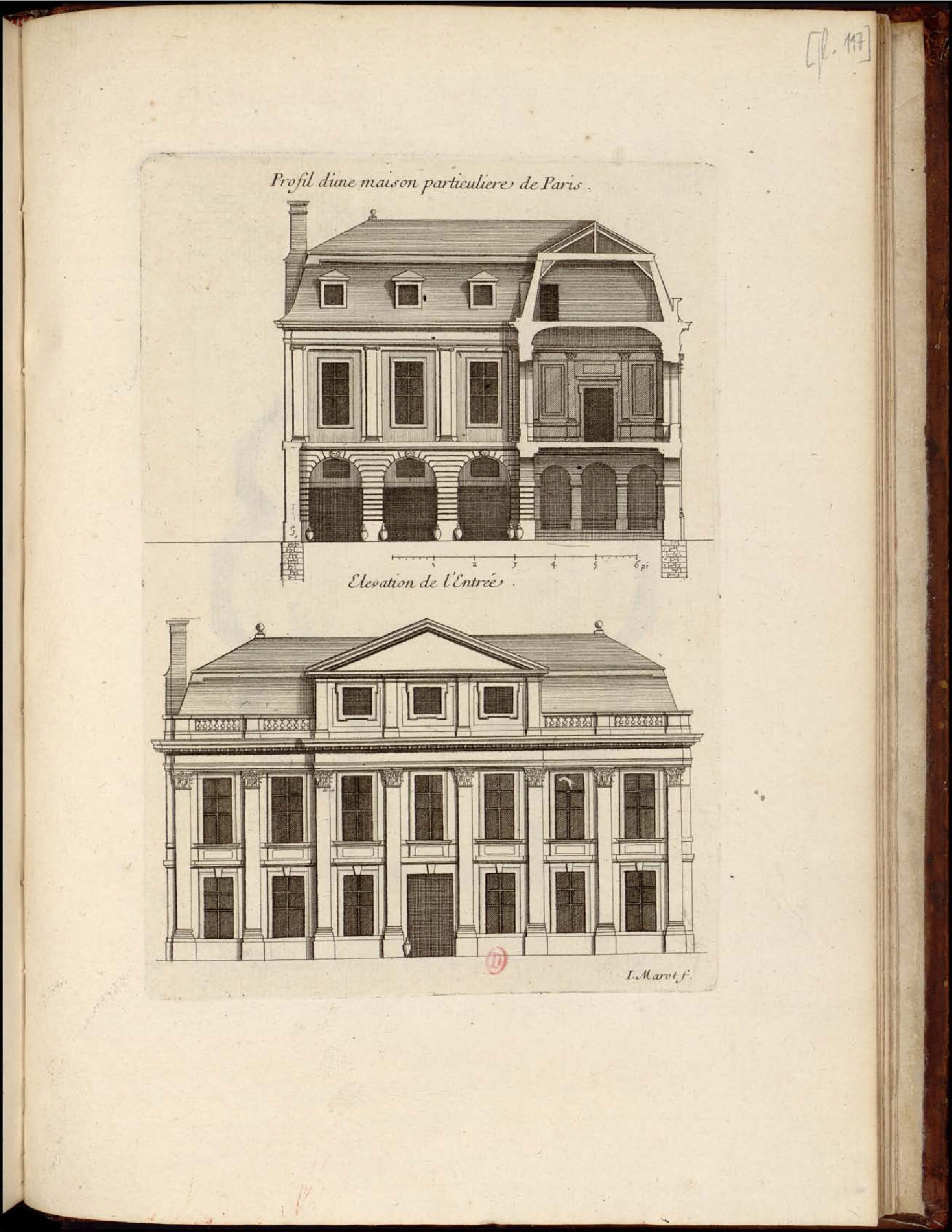
Elevation of the courtyard façade with a transverse section of the corps de logis (above) and elevation of the street façade (below)

== Bibliography ==
- Deutsch, Kristina (2015). Jean Marot : Un graveur d'architecture à l'époque de Louis XIV. Berlin: De Gruyter. ISBN 9783110375954.
- Dumolin, Maurice (1930). Études de topographie parisienne, vol. 2. Paris. OCLC 930440136.
- Gady, Alexandre (2008). Les Hôtels particuliers de Paris du Moyen Âge à la Belle Époque. Paris: Parigramme. ISBN 9782840962137.
- Mignot, Claude (2010). "Les premières oeuvres de Jean Marot, graveur d'architecture 1645–1659", pp. 293–313, in L'estampe au Grand siècle, études offertes à Maxime Préaud. Paris: École nationale des chartes and Bibliothèque nationale de France. ISBN 9782357230118.
- Vitu, Auguste-Charles-Joseph (1880). La Maison mortuaire de Molière d'apres des Documents inédits, avec Plans et Dessins. Paris: Alphonse Lemerre. Copy at HathiTrust. Copy at Gallica.
