= Hilary Ballon =

American architectural historian (1956–2017)

Hilary Ballon (1956 –June 16, 2017) was an American historian of architecture and urbanism.

Ballon earned her BA from Princeton University in 1977 and a PhD from MIT in 1985 in the field of architecture, art, and environmental studies.

She was a member of the faculty at Columbia University from 1985 to 2006, where she was also a Fellow of the Heyman Center for the Humanities.

From 2007 until her death she held the title of university professor at New York University and taught in the graduate planning program at the Robert F. Wagner Graduate School of Public Service. She also served as Deputy Vice Chancellor of NYU Abu Dhabi, and was "part of the leadership team" that developed and opened the campus. The teaching and learning center at that campus is named in her memory.

She curated exhibits at the Museum of the City of New York, including on Robert Moses from 2006 to 2007, as well as the bicentennial of the Commissioners' Plan of 1811 from 2011 to 2012.

== Books ==
- The Greatest Grid: The Master Plan of Manhattan, 1811–2011 (Columbia University Press, 2012)
- The Guggenheim: Frank Lloyd Wright and the Making of the Modern Museum (2009)
- Robert Moses and the Modern City: The Transformation of New York (with Kenneth T. Jackson, W.W. Norton, 2007).
- New York’s Pennsylvania Stations (W.W. Norton, 2002)
- Louis Le Vau: Mazarin's College, Colbert's Revenge (Princeton University Press, 2000) – winner of the Prix d’Academie from the Academie Francaise.
- The Paris of Henri IV: Architecture and Urbanism (MIT Press, 1991)

== Personal life ==
On January 7, 1989, Ballon married Orin Kramer, who was president of Kramer Associates, a public policy consulting firm, and had been an associate director of the White House domestic policy staff in the Carter Administration.
