= Auguste Jal =

French author of works on maritime archaeology and history

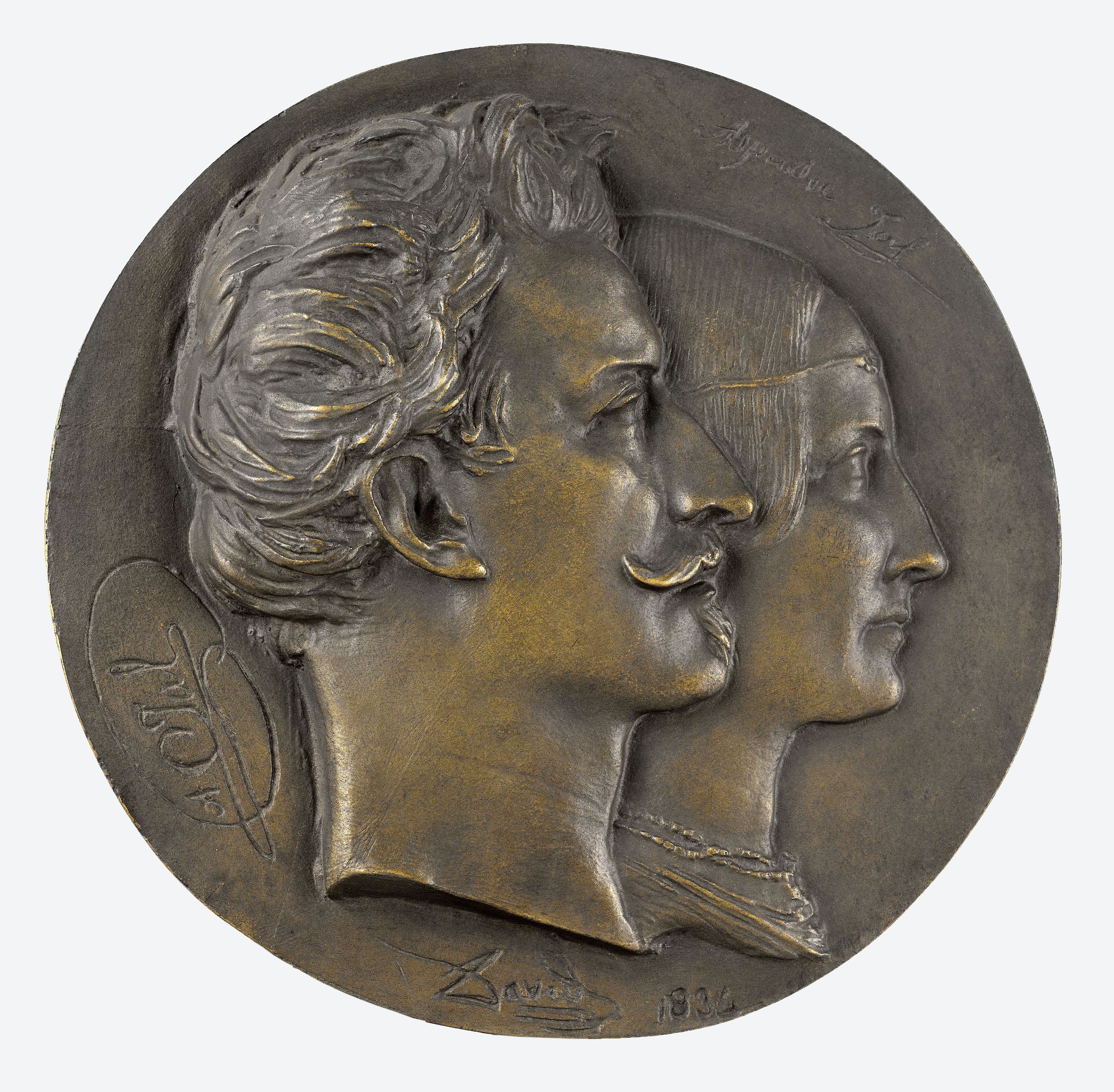
Portrait of Auguste and Aspasie Jal by David d'Angers, 1834

Auguste Jal (12 April 1795, in Lyon – 5 April 1873) was a French writer who wrote on maritime archaeology and history.

== Biography ==
He was educated at the naval school in Brest, and led a company of the cadets in the defense of Paris during the Hundred Days (1815). His first literary work was published in the journals Le Fureteur, Le Miroir, and Le Pandore. Later he became well known as an art critic. In 1831 he received official charge of the marine archives.

== Works ==
He became known as the author of numerous works on art, and especially on maritime archaeology. His works include:

- Scènes de la vie maritime ("Scenes from life at sea", 3 vols., Paris, 1832)
- Archéologie navale ("Naval archaeology", 2 vols., 1839) Written in connection with his administration of the marine archives.
- Glossaire nautique ("Nautical glossary", 1848) Written in connection with his administration of the marine archives. It won the second Gobert Prize.
- La flotte de César ("Caesar's fleet", 1861)
- Dictionnaire critique de biographie et d'histoire ("Critical dictionary of biography and history", 1864) Published with the goal of revising errors and of filling in gaps in encyclopedias.
- Dictionnaire critique de biographie et d'histoire, 2nd edition, 1872
- Souvenirs d'un homme de lettres (1877) His memoirs.
