= Bâtiments du Roi =

French division of the Maison du Roi

The Bâtiments du Roi (French pronunciation: [bɑtimɑ̃ dy ʁwa], 'King's Buildings') was a division of the Maison du Roi ('King's Household') in France under the Ancien Régime. It was responsible for building works at the King's residences in and around Paris.

== History ==
The Bâtiments du Roi was created by Henry IV of France to coordinate the building works at his royal palaces. Formerly, each palace had its own superintendent of works. Henry gave the task of supervising all works to Maximilien de Béthune, Duke of Sully.

In the 17th century, the responsibilities of the Bâtiments du Roi extended beyond pure building works, to include the manufacture of tapestries and porcelain. In 1664, Jean-Baptiste Colbert was entitled surintendant et ordonnateur général des bâtiments, arts, tapisseries et manufactures de France ("superintendent and director-general of building, art, tapestries and factories of France"). This title was retained by several of his successors. Other areas that came within under the control of the Bâtiments du Roi included botanical gardens, and the Royal Academies of painting and sculpture, and of architecture.

The wide scope of the responsibilities meant that the superintendent of the Bâtiments du Roi was effectively a minister of the French king. The director general was assisted by the first architect to the King (premier architecte du Roi) and the first painter to the King (premier peintre du Roi), a staff of inspectors, architects and several hundred workmen. Much of the work was left to the director's first lieutenants, such as Robert de Cotte and Gilles-Marie Oppenord.

== Responsibilities ==
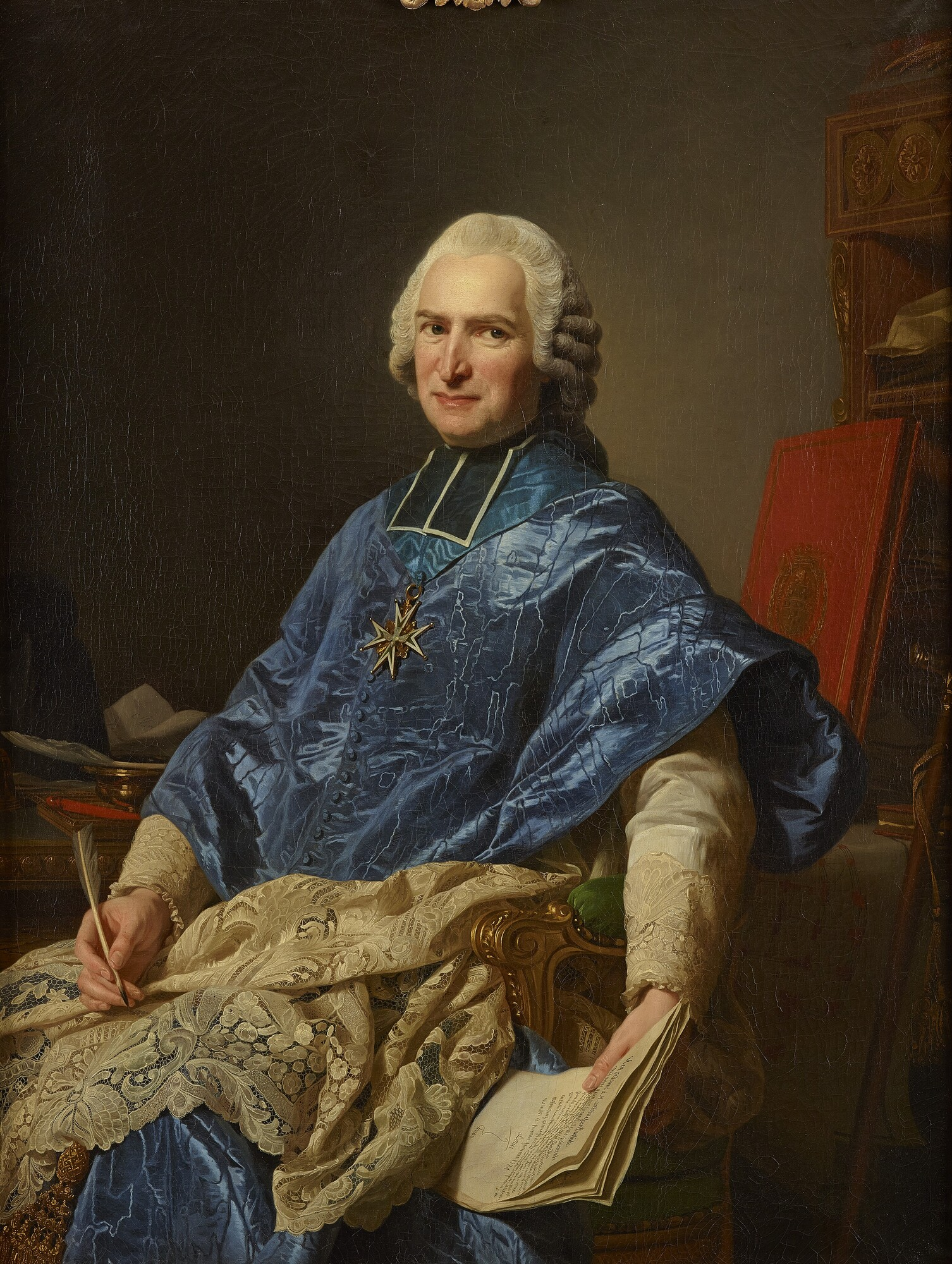
Portrait of Joseph Marie Terray by Alexander Roslin, 1774

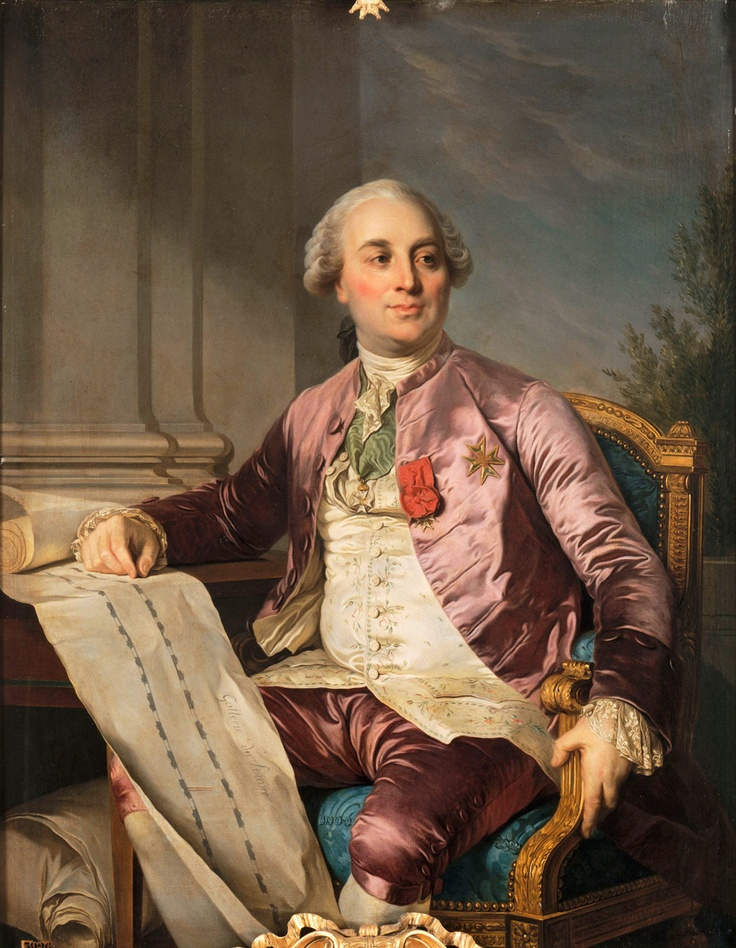
Portrait of the Comte d'Angiviller by Joseph Duplessis, 1779.

According to a royal decree of 1 September 1776, the Bâtiments du Roi was responsible for:

- works of construction and maintenance of the main royal residences (the Louvre, the Tuileries, Versailles) and other subsidiary residences (including Saint-Germain-en-Laye, Fontainebleau, Compiègne) and their parks and gardens;
- designing and building public works, such as the Place Louis-le-Grand (now the Place Vendôme) and the Invalides;
- managing the royal academies of painting and sculpture, and architecture;
- production of tapestries at Gobelins and Savonnerie, and porcelain at Sèvres;
- oversight of the town of Versailles.

Its responsibilities includes all buildings with a royal connection:

- Château de Versailles, Grand Trianon, Petit Trianon
- Château de Marly
- Château de Fontainebleau
- Château de Saint-Germain-en-Laye
- Château de Meudon
- Palais du Louvre
- Palais des Tuileries
- Palais-Royal
- Palais du Luxembourg
- Château de Clagny
- Château de Madrid
- Château de La Muette
- Château de Vincennes
- Château de Compiègne
- Château de Blois
- Château de Chambord
- Château d'Amboise
- Château de Choisy
- Château de Saint-Hubert
- Château de Bellevue
- Jardin des Plantes
- Maison royale de Saint-Louis à Saint-Cyr-l'École
- Collège de France
- Manufacture des Gobelins
- Manufacture de la Savonnerie

== Superintendents or directors-general of the Bâtiments du Roi ==
From 1602 to 1708, and from 1716 to 1726, the head of the Bâtiments du Roi was known as a superintendent (surintendant général). From 1708 to 1716, and from 1726 to 1791, the head was known as the director general (directeur général).

- 1602–1621: Maximilien de Béthune (1560–1641), duc de Sully (also surintendant des finances)
- 1621: Louis d'Aloigny, baron de Rochefort
- 1622–1624: Jean de Fourcy de Corbinière
- 1625–1638: Henri de Fourcy de Corbinière
- 1638–1645: François Sublet de Noyers
- 1646–1648: Jules Mazarin (1602-1661)
- 1648–1656: Étienne Le Camus
- 1656–1664: Antoine de Ratabon
- 1664–1683: Jean-Baptiste Colbert (1619–1683) (also contrôleur général des finances and Secretary of State of the Maison du Roi)
- 1683–1691: François Michel Le Tellier de Louvois (1641–1691)
- 1691–1699: Édouard Colbert de Villacerf (1629–1699)
- 1699–1708: Jules Hardouin-Mansart (1646–1708) (also Premier architecte du Roi)
- 1708–1736: Louis Antoine de Pardaillan de Gondrin (1665–1736), duc d'Antin
- 1736–1745: Philibert Orry (1689–1747) (also contrôleur général des finances)
- 1745–1751: Charles François Paul Le Normant de Tournehem (1684–1751)
- 1751–1773: Abel-François Poisson de Vandières (1727–1781), marquis de Marigny
- 1773–1774: Joseph Marie Terray (1715–1778) (also contrôleur général des finances)
- 1774–1789: Charles Claude Flahaut de La Billarderie (1730–1810), comte d'Angiviller

== See also ==
- Premier Architecte du Roi
