= Louis Le Vau =

French architect (1612–1670)

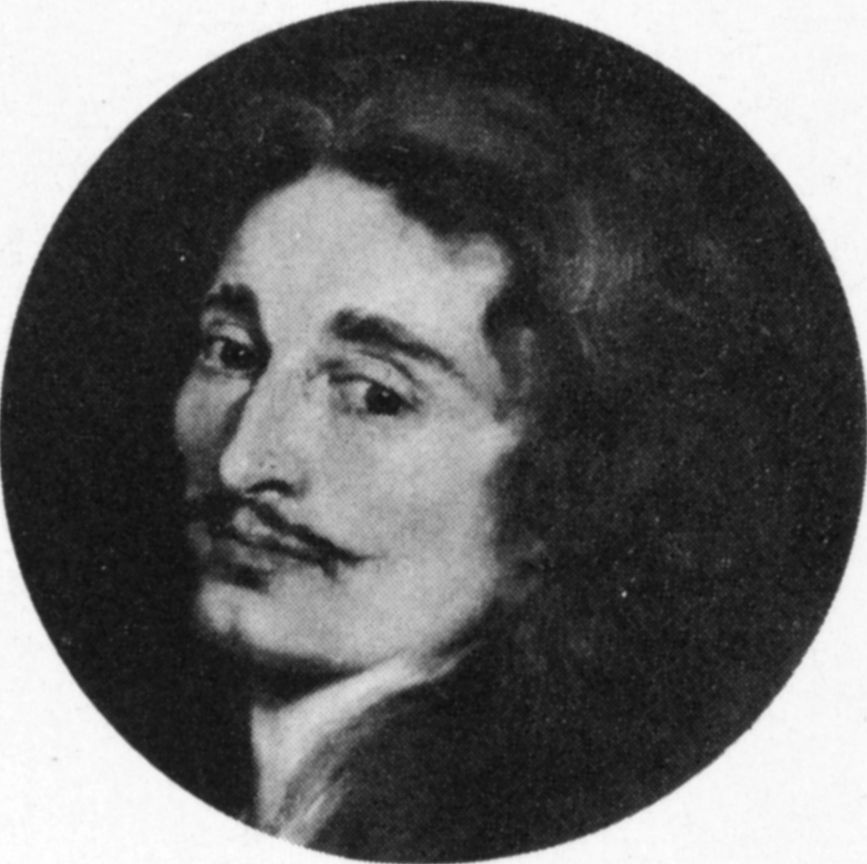
- Louis Le Vau, c. 1650
- Born: Louis Le Veau c. 1612 likely Paris, France
- Died: 11 October 1670 (aged 57 or 58); Paris, France
- Occupation: Architect
- Buildings: Hôtel Lambert; Château de Versailles; Château de Vincennes; Vaux-le-Vicomte; Louvre Palace; Collège des Quatre-Nations
- Design: Oval salon at Vaux-le-Vicomte

Louis Le Vau (French pronunciation: [lwi l(ə) vo]; c. 1612 – 11 October 1670) was a French architect, who worked for King Louis XIV. Along with Salomon de Brosse, Jacques Lemercier, and François Mansart, Louis Le Vau was one of the early exponents of French architectural classicism. He developed a style marked by sensitivity to context and originality of plan. His most notable works include the Hôtel Lambert, the château Vaux-le-Vicomte, and the Collège des Quatre-Nations (now the Institut de France).

== Early life and career ==
Born Louis Le Veau, he was the son of Louis Le Veau (died February 1661), a stonemason, who was active in Paris. His younger brother François Le Vau (born in 1624) also became an architect. The father and his two sons worked together in the 1630s and 1640s. The two brothers later changed the spelling of their surname from "Le Veau" to "Le Vau" to avoid its association with the French word veau (calf).

Le Vau started his career by designing the Hotel de Bautru in 1634. By 1639, he was developing town houses (hôtels particuliers) for rich citizens such as Sainctot, Hesselin, Gillier, Gruyn des Bordes, and Jean Baptiste Lambert in the île Saint-Louis, which was being developed as a residential area. His most notable work during this period is the Hôtel Lambert (c. 1638–1653).

Hôtel Lambert

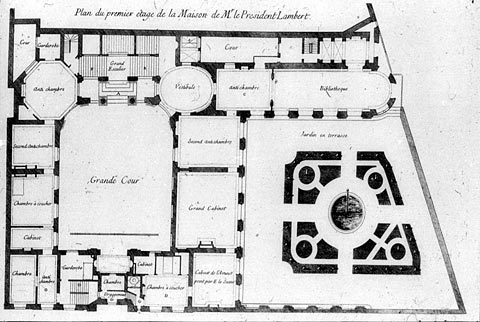
Plan of the premier étage with the Seine to the right

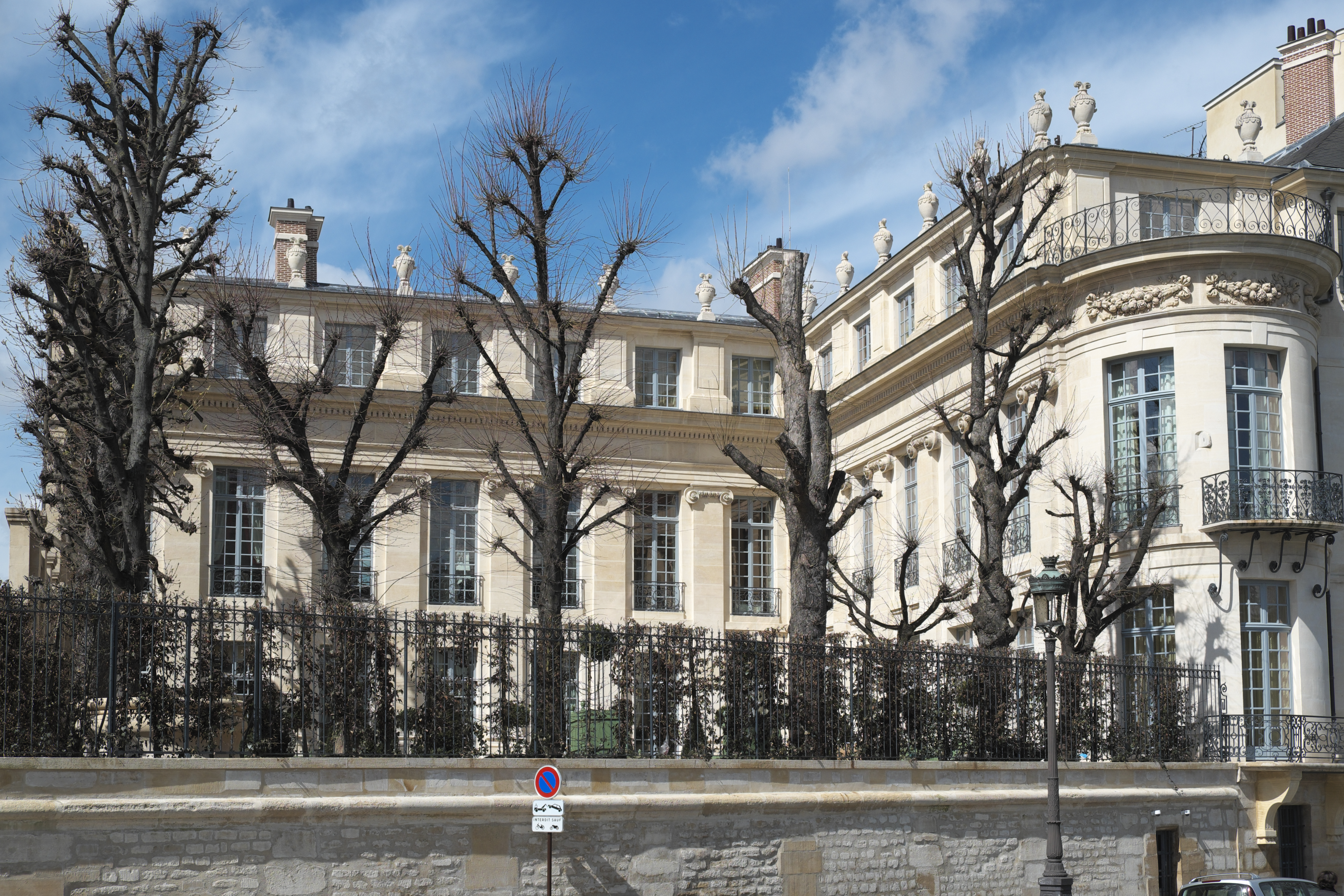
Garden façades viewed from the riverbank

Le Vau also designed country houses, including the Château de Livry (c. 1640–1645), later known as the Château du Raincy.

== Royal architect ==
In 1654, his career was advanced through his appointment as the first architect to the king, succeeding Jacques Lemercier. He was commissioned by Cardinal Mazarin to help rebuild part of the medieval Château de Vincennes.

Le Vau's additions at the Château de Vincennes

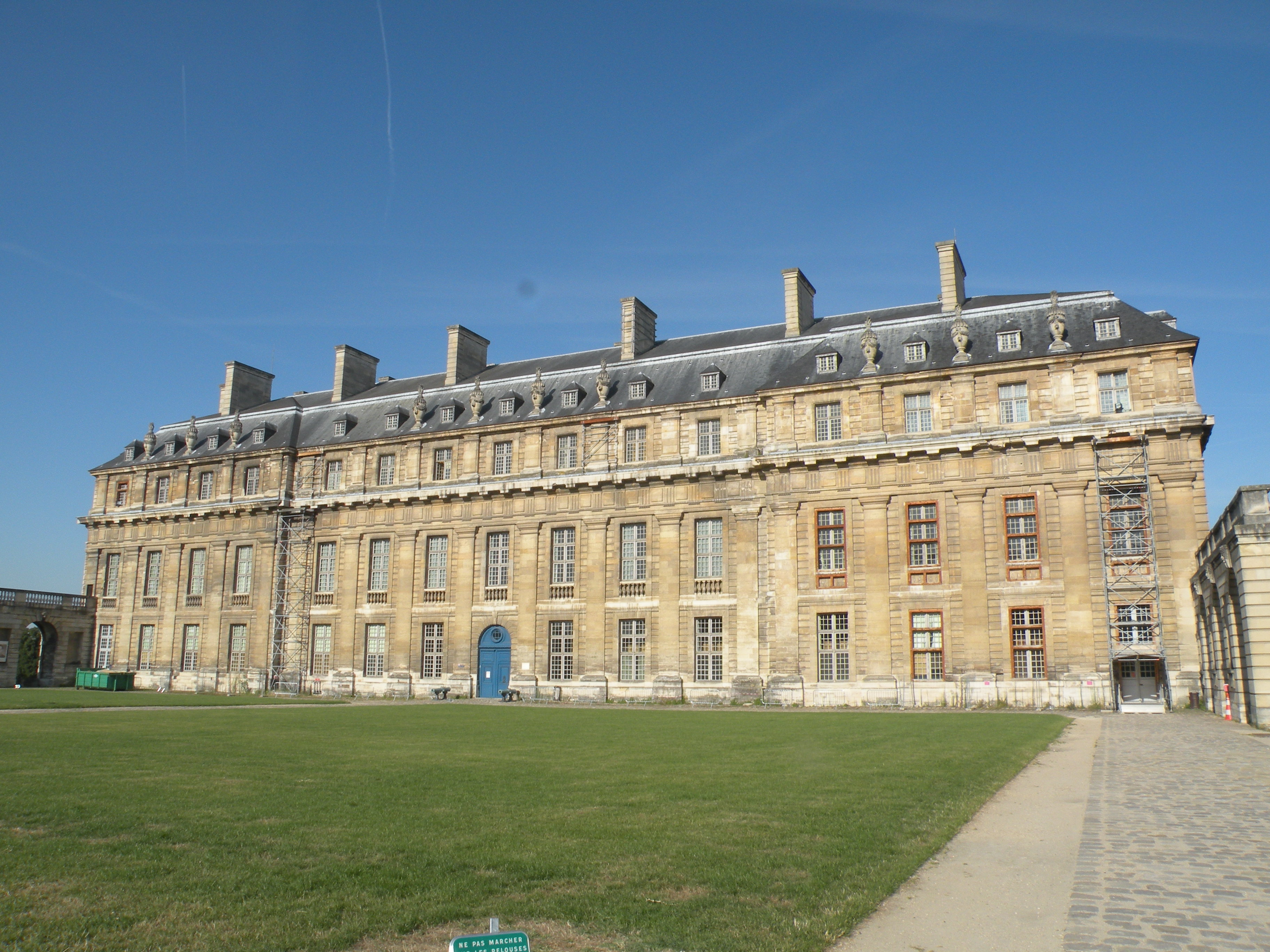
Pavilion of the King (east façade)

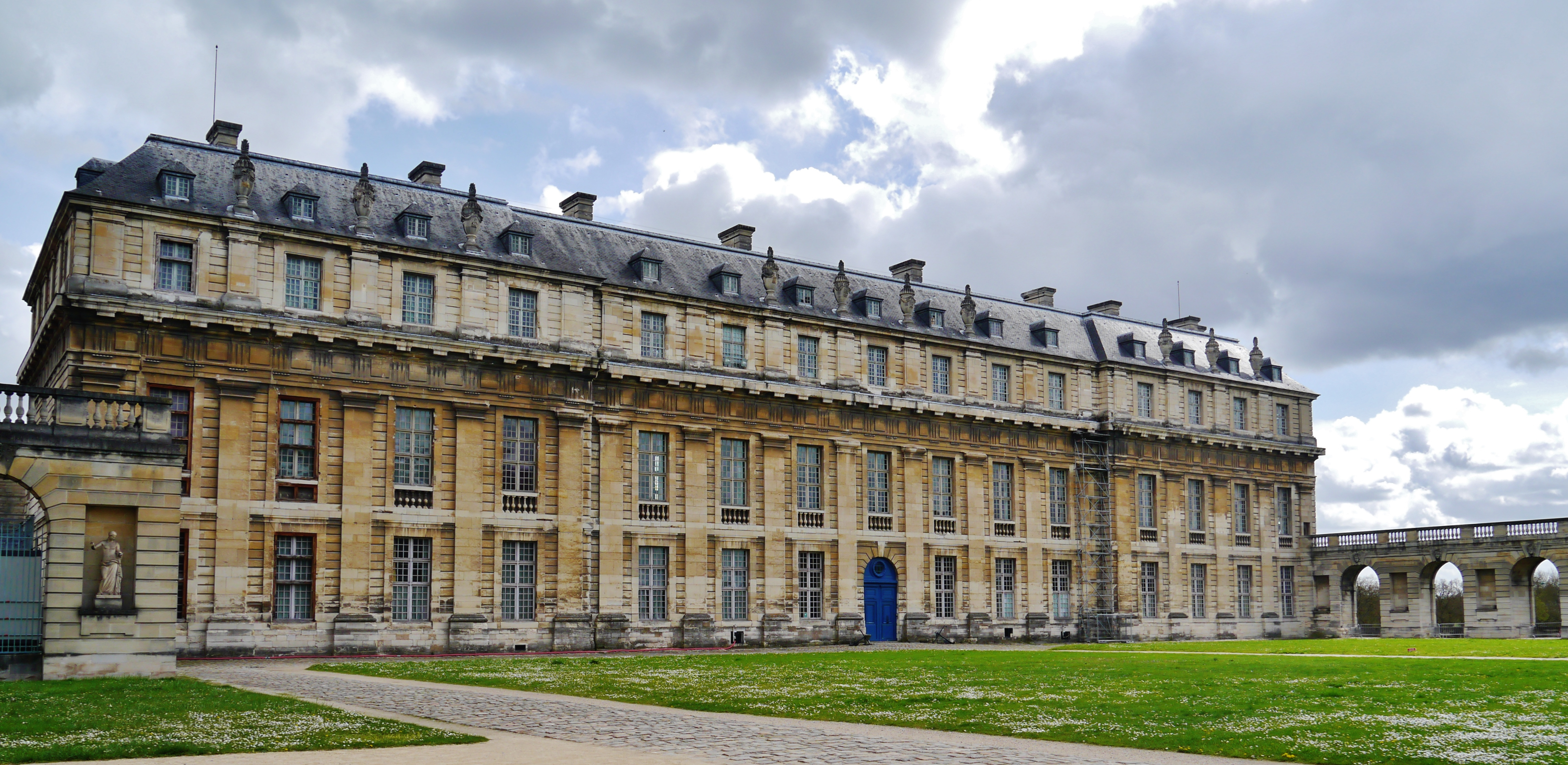
Pavilion of the Queen (west façade)

Shortly after, in 1656 he was given the important commission to build the chateau of Nicolas Fouquet, Vaux-le-Vicomte with the help of André Le Nôtre and Charles Le Brun. Le Vau's most notable work in the Vaux-le-Vicomte is the oval salon facing the garden. This design, an example of a salon à l'italienne (vaulted, two-storied room), develops the idea that a simple form governs the shape of the main section of the building.

Château Vau-le-Vicomte

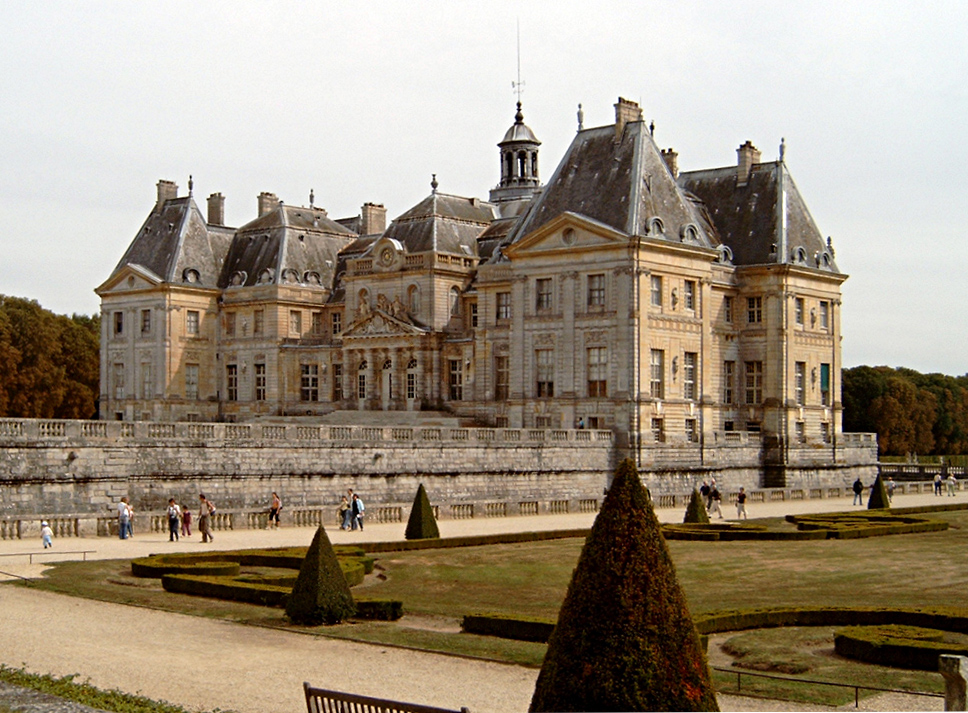
Rhythmic massing of the entrance front

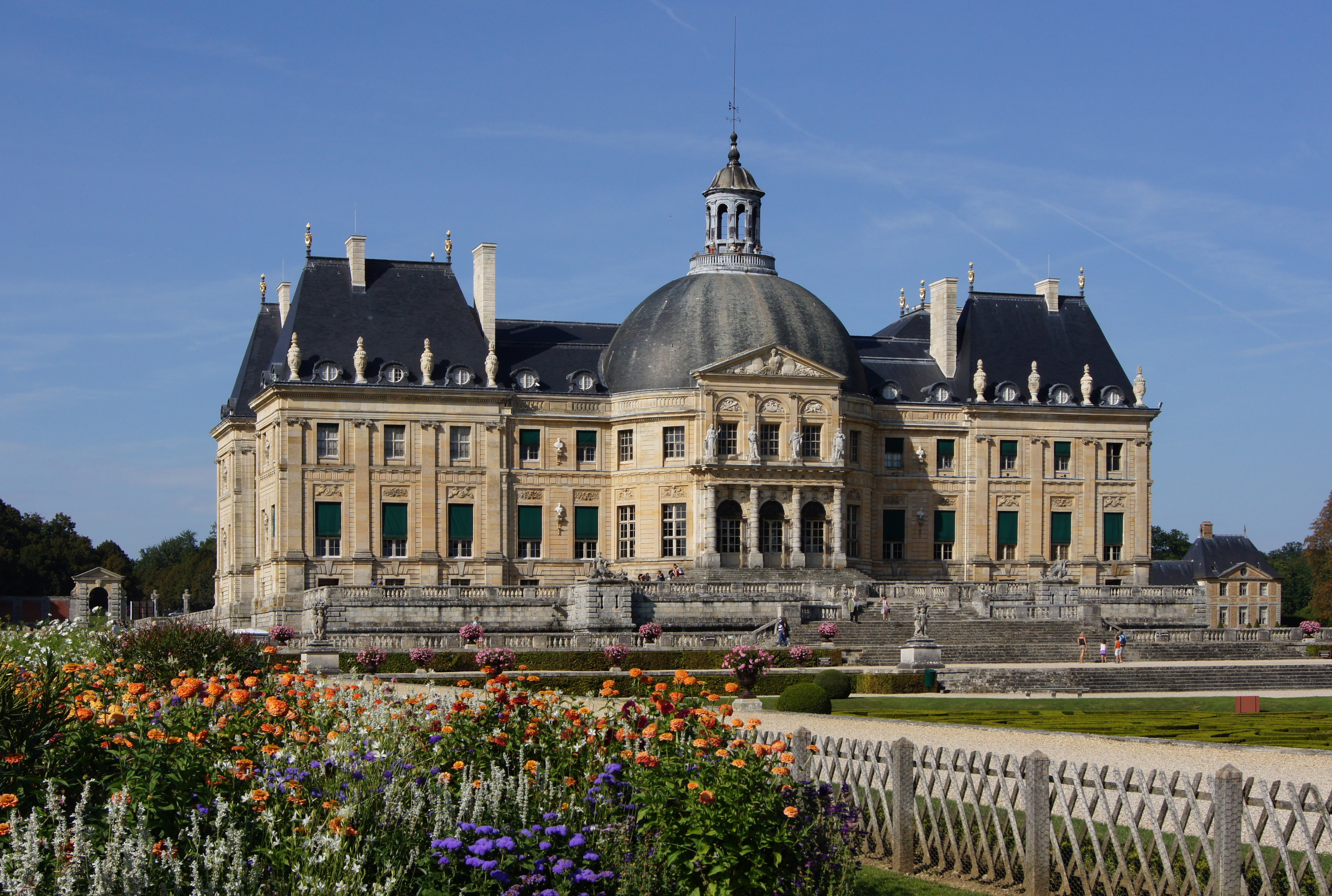
View of the garden front with the oval salon

In the 1660s Le Vau helped on royal projects, such as the hospital of La Salpêtrière and the facade of the Tuileries Palace. From 1661 to 1664 Le Vau worked on rebuilding the Galerie d'Apollon in the Louvre after it burned in a fire. Claude Perrault and Charles Le Brun were also involved in creating the famous façade for the east front of the Louvre from 1665 to 1674, which acted as a prelude for Classical Architecture in the 18th century.

The most notable work of Le Vau's career was at the Palace of Versailles with which he was involved for the remainder of his life. He added service wings to the forecourts and, after 1668, had rebuilt the garden façade to be totally classical. Le Vau was assisted by François d'Orbay, who completed the work after Le Vau's death. Le Vau and d'Orbay's work at Versailles was later modified and extended by Jules Hardouin-Mansart.

Le Vau's designs for the Collège des Quatre-Nations (now housing the Institut de France) were completed after his death by his assistant François d' Orbay and showed unlikely rapport with Italian baroque techniques.

Versailles and the Collège des Quatre-Nations

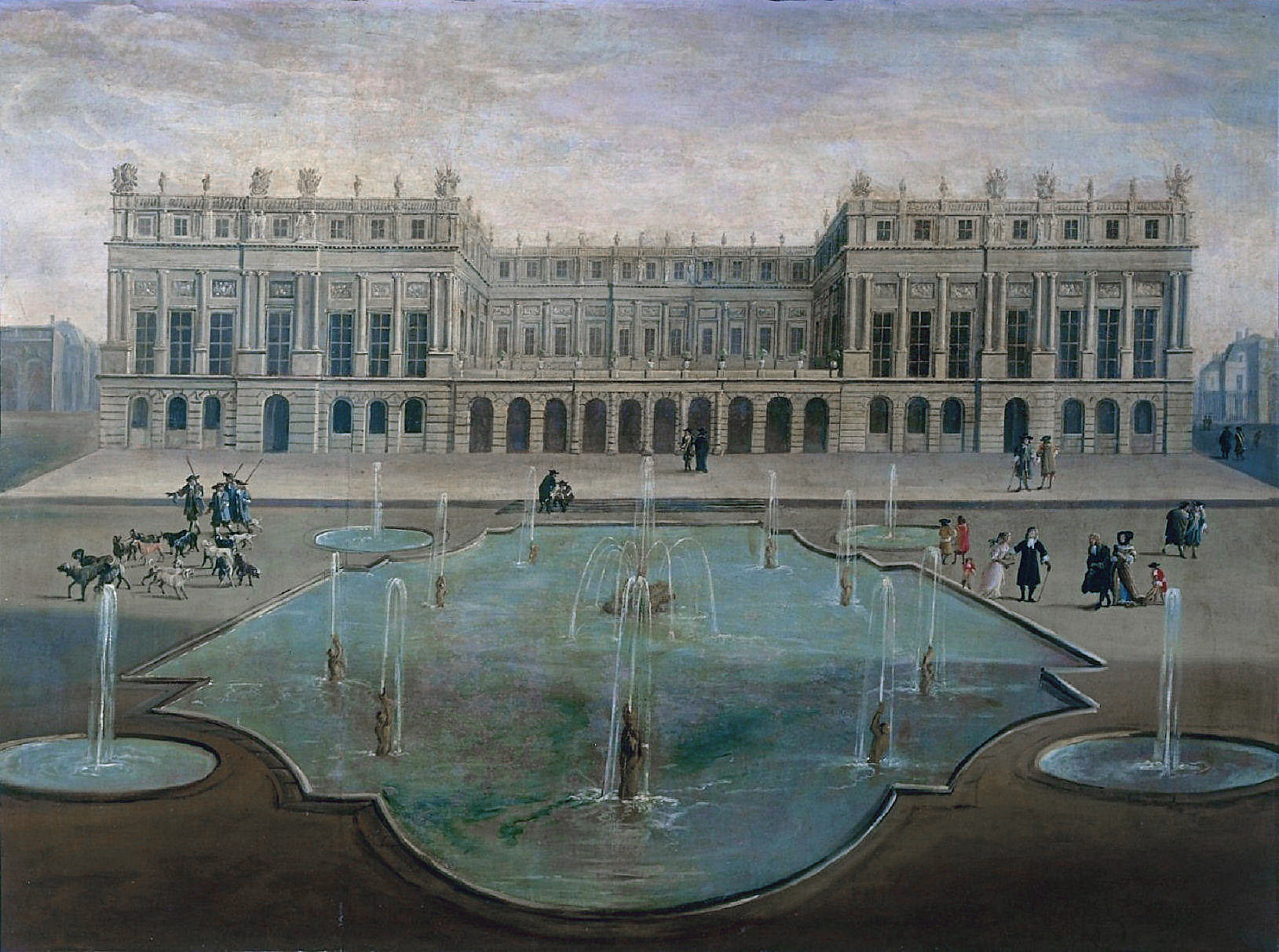
Le Vau's garden front at the Château de Versailles, c. 1675

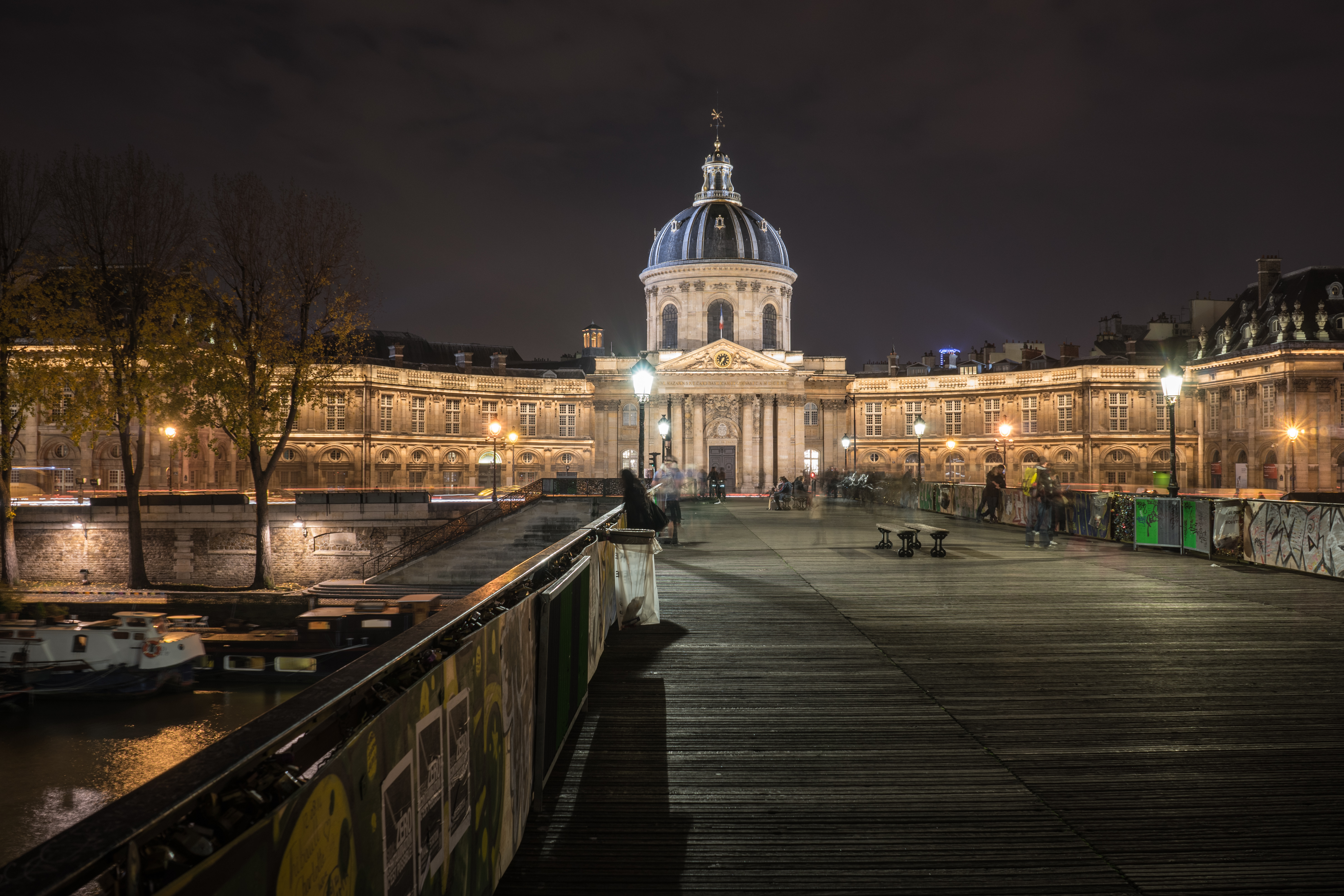
Collège des Quatre-Nations in 2014

== Death ==
Louis Le Vau died on 11 October 1670, aged around 57, at the former Hôtel de Longueville and was buried at the church of Saint-Germain l'Auxerrois in Paris.

== Bibliography ==
- Bajou, Thierry (1998). La peinture à Versailles : XVIIe siècle. [English edition: Paintings at Versailles: XVIIth Century, translated by Elizabeth Wiles-Portier, p. 76.] Paris: Réunion des musées nationaux. ISBN 9782283017647. ISBN 9782283017654 (English edition).
- Ballon, Hilary (1999). Louis Le Vau: Mazarin's Collège, Colbert's Revenge. Princeton, New Jersey: Princeton University Press. ISBN 9780691048956.
- Berger, Robert W. (1982). "Le Vau, Louis", vol. 2, pp. 695–697, in Macmillan Encyclopedia of Architects, edited by Adolf K. Placzek. London: Collier Macmillan. ISBN 9780029250006.
- Cojannot, Alexandre (2012). Louis Le Vau et les nouvelles ambitions de l'architecture française 1612–1654 (in French). Paris: Picard. ISBN 9782708409361.
- Curl, James Stevens (2006). A Dictionary of Architecture and Landscape Architecture, second edition. Oxford: Oxford University Press. ISBN 9780191726484.
- Encyclopedia of World Biography (second edition, 1998), edited by Suzanne M. Bourgoin and Paula K. Byers. Detroit: Gale. ISBN 0787622214.
- Feldmann, Dietrich (1996). "Le Vau (1) Louis Le Vau", vol. 19, pp. 262–267, in The Dictionary of Art (34 vols.), edited by Jane Turner. New York: Grove. ISBN 9781884446009. Also at Oxford Art Online, subscription required.
- Hardouin, Christophe (1994). "La Collection de portraits de l'Académie royale de Peinture et de Sculpture: Peintures entrées sous le règne de Louis XIV (1648–1715", Mémoire de D.E.A., Université de Paris IV, 1994, pp. 164–166.
- Jal, Auguste (1873). Abraham du Quesne et la marine de son temps, vol. 2. Paris: Henri Plon. Copy at Google Books.
- Laprade, Albert (1955). "Portraits des premiers architectes de Versailles", Revue des Arts, March 1955, pp. 21–24. ISSN 0482-7872
- Laprade, Albert (1960). François d'Orbay: Architecte de Louis XIV. Paris: Éditions Vincent, Fréal. OCLC 562063179, 780531730, 1096782.
