= List of finance ministers of France =

This is a list of ministers of finance of France, including the equivalent positions of Superintendent of Finances and Controller-General of Finances during the Ancien Régime. The position of Superintendent of Finances was abolished following the arrest of Nicolas Fouquet; his powers were transferred to First Minister Jean-Baptiste Colbert, who would become ex officio Controller-General of Finances four years later after the elevation of the office.

== Superintendents of Finances, 1518–1661 ==
Superintendent	Term start	Term end
Jacques de Beaune, lord de Semblançay	1518	1524
Philibert Babou	1524	1544
Jean du Thiers, lord de Beauregard	1544	1546
Claude d'Annebault	1546	1552
André Guillart	1552	1556
Jean d'Avançon	1556	1559
Charles, Cardinal of Lorraine	1559	1560
Artus de Cossé-Brissac and Louis d'Ongnyes, comte de Chaulnes	1561	1567
René de Birague	1568	1570
Pomponne de Bellièvre	1574	1588
François d'O	1588	1594
Maximilien de Béthune, duc de Sully	1598	1611
Pierre Jeannin	1614	1619
Henri de Schomberg, comte de Nanteuil	1619	1622
Charles, marquis de La Vieuville	1623	1624
Jean Bochart de Champigny and Michel de Marillac	1624	1626
Antoine Coëffier de Ruzé, marquis d'Effiat	1626	1632
Claude de Bullion and Claude Bouthillier	1632	1640
Claude Bouthillier	1640	1643
Nicolas de Bailleul and Claude de Mesmes, comte d'Avaux	1643	1647
Michel Particelli d'Émery	1647	1648
Armand-Charles de La Porte, maréchal-duc de La Meilleraye	1648	1649
Michel Particelli d'Émery and Claude de Mesmes, comte d'Avaux	1649	1650
René de Longueil, marquis de Maisons	1650	1651
Charles, duc de La Vieuville	1651	1653
Abel Servien and Nicolas Fouquet	3 February 1653	16 February 1659
Nicolas Fouquet	16 February 1659	4 May 1661

== Controller-General of Finances, 1661–1791 ==
Controller-General	Term start	Term end
Jean-Baptiste Colbert	12 December 1665	6 September 1683
Claude Le Pelletier	1683	1689
Louis Phélypeaux, comte de Pontchartrain	20 September 1689	1699
Michel Chamillart	5 September 1699	20 February 1708
Nicolas Desmarets	20 February 1708	15 September 1715
Adrien Maurice, duc de Noailles (President of the Finances Council)	1 October 1715	28 January 1718
Henri-Jacques Nompar de Caumont, duc de la Force (vice-president of the Finances Council)	28 January 1718	5 January 1720
Marc-René de Voyer de Paulmy d'Argenson (1652–1721) (President of the Finances Council)	28 January 1718	5 January 1720
John Law	5 January 1720	28 May 1720
Michel Robert Le Peletier des Forts (Commissioner of Finance)	28 May 1720	11 December 1720
Félix Le Pelletier de La Houssaye	11 December 1720	21 April 1722
Charles Gaspard Dodun	21 April 1722	14 June 1726
Michel Robert Le Peletier des Forts	14 June 1726	19 March 1730
Philibert Orry	19 March 1730	5 December 1745
Jean-Baptiste de Machault d'Arnouville	6 December 1745	30 July 1754
Jean Moreau de Séchelles	30 July 1754	24 April 1756
François Marie Peyrenc de Moras	24 April 1756	25 August 1757
Jean de Boullonges	25 August 1757	4 March 1759
Étienne de Silhouette	4 March 1759	21 November 1759
Henri Léonard Jean Baptiste Bertin	23 November 1759	14 December 1763
Clément Charles François de Laverdy	14 December 1763	20 September 1768
Étienne Maynon d'Invault	22 September 1768	19 December 1769
Joseph Marie Terray	22 December 1769	24 August 1774
Anne Robert Jacques Turgot	24 August 1774	12 May 1776
Jean Étienne Bernard Clugny de Nuits	21 May 1776	18 October 1776
Louis-Gabriel Taboureau des Réaux	21 October 1776	29 June 1777
Jacques Necker (Director-General of Finances)	29 June 1777	19 May 1781
Jean-François Joly de Fleury	21 May 1781	29 March 1783
Henri François de Paule Lefèvre d'Ormesson	29 March 1783	1 November 1783
Charles Alexandre de Calonne	3 November 1783	9 April 1787
Michel Bouvard de Fourqueux	10 April 1787	1 May 1787
Étienne Charles de Loménie de Brienne (President of the Royal Council of Finances)	1 May 1787	25 August 1788
Jacques Necker (Director-General of Finances)	26 August 1788	11 July 1789
Joseph Foullon de Doué	13 July 1789	16 July 1789
Jacques Necker (Director-General of Finances)	16 July 1789	4 September 1790
Charles Claude Guillaume Lambert	4 September 1790	4 December 1790
Claude Antoine Valdec de Lessart	4 December 1790	27 April 1791

== Ministers of Finance, 1791–1944 ==
Minister	Term start	Term end
Claude Antoine Valdec de Lessart	27 April 1791	29 May 1791
Louis Hardouin Tarbé	29 May 1791	24 March 1792
Étienne Clavière	24 March 1792	13 June 1792
Antoine Duranthon	13 June 1792	18 June 1792
Jules Émile François Hervé de Beaulieu	18 June 1792	29 July 1792
Joseph Delaville-Leroulx	29 July 1792	10 August 1792
Étienne Clavière	10 August 1792	13 June 1793
Louis Grégoire Des Champs des Tournelles	13 June 1793	20 April 1794
	20 April 1794	8 November 1795
Guillaume-Charles Faipoult	8 November 1795	14 February 1796
Dominique-Vincent Ramel de Nogaret	14 February 1796	20 July 1799
Robert Lindet	20 July 1799	10 November 1799
Martin Michel Charles Gaudin, duc de Gaète	10 November 1799	1 April 1814
Joseph Dominique, baron Louis	3 April 1814	20 March 1815
Martin Michel Charles Gaudin, duc de Gaète	20 March 1815	7 July 1815
Joseph Dominique, baron Louis	9 July 1815	26 September 1815
Louis Emmanuel, comte Corvetto	26 September 1815	7 December 1818
Antoine Roy	7 December 1818	29 December 1818
Joseph Dominique, baron Louis	29 December 1818	19 November 1819
Antoine Roy	19 November 1819	14 December 1821
Jean-Baptiste de Villèle	14 December 1821	4 January 1828
Antoine, comte Roy	4 January 1828	8 August 1829
Christophe, comte de Chabrol de Crouzol	8 August 1829	19 May 1830
Guillaume Isidore, comte de Montbel	19 May 1830	31 July 1830
Joseph Dominique, baron Louis	31 July 1830	2 November 1830
Jacques Laffitte	2 November 1830	13 March 1831
Joseph Dominique, baron Louis	13 March 1831	11 October 1832
Jean-Georges Humann	11 October 1832	10 November 1834
Hippolyte Passy	10 November 1834	18 November 1834
Jean-Georges Humann	18 November 1834	18 January 1836
Antoine, comte d'Argout	18 January 1836	6 September 1836
Charles Marie Tanneguy Duchâtel	6 September 1836	15 April 1837
Jean Pierre Joseph Lacave-Laplagne	15 April 1837	31 March 1839
Jean-Élie Gautier	31 March 1839	12 May 1839
Hippolyte Passy	12 May 1839	1 March 1840
Privat Joseph Claramont, comte Pelet de la Lozère	1 March 1840	29 October 1840
Jean-Georges Humann	29 October 1840	25 April 1842
Jean Pierre Joseph Lacave-Laplagne	25 April 1842	9 May 1847
Pierre Sylvain Dumon	9 May 1847	24 February 1848
Michel Goudchaux	24 February 1848	5 March 1848
Louis Antoine Garnier-Pagès	5 March 1848	11 May 1848
Charles Duclerc	11 May 1848	28 June 1848
Michel Goudchaux	28 June 1848	25 October 1848
Ariste Jacques Trouvé-Chauvel	25 October 1848	20 December 1848
Hippolyte Passy	20 December 1848	31 October 1849
Achille Fould	31 October 1849	24 January 1851
Charles Le Bègue de Germiny	24 January 1851	10 April 1851
Achille Fould	10 April 1851	26 October 1851
Antoine Blondel	26 October 1851	23 November 1851
François, comte de Casabianca	23 November 1851	3 December 1851
Achille Fould	3 December 1851	22 January 1852
Jean-Martial Bineau	22 January 1852	3 February 1855
Pierre Magne	3 February 1855	26 November 1860
Adolphe Forcade La Roquette	26 November 1860	14 November 1861
Achille Fould	14 November 1861	20 January 1867
Eugène Rouher	20 January 1867	13 November 1867
Pierre Magne	13 November 1867	2 January 1870
Louis Buffet	2 January 1870	14 April 1870
Émile Alexis Segris	14 April 1870	10 August 1870
Pierre Magne	10 August 1870	4 September 1870
Ernest Picard	4 September 1870	19 February 1871
Louis Buffet	19 February 1871	25 February 1871
Augustin Pouyer-Quertier	25 February 1871	23 April 1872
Eugène de Goulard	23 April 1872	7 December 1872
Léon Say	7 December 1872	25 May 1873
Pierre Magne	25 May 1873	20 July 1874
Pierre Mathieu-Bodet	20 July 1874	10 March 1875
Léon Say	10 March 1875	17 May 1877
Eugène Caillaux	17 May 1877	23 November 1877
François Dutilleul	23 November 1877	13 December 1877
Léon Say	13 December 1877	28 December 1879
Pierre Magnin	28 December 1879	14 November 1881
François Allain-Targé	14 November 1881	30 January 1882
Léon Say	30 January 1882	7 August 1882
Pierre Tirard	7 August 1882	6 April 1885
Jean Clamageran	6 April 1885	16 April 1885
Marie François Sadi Carnot	16 April 1885	11 December 1886
Albert Dauphin	11 December 1886	30 May 1887
Maurice Rouvier	30 May 1887	12 December 1887
Pierre Tirard	12 December 1887	3 April 1888
Paul Peytral	3 April 1888	22 February 1889
Maurice Rouvier	22 February 1889	12 December 1892
Pierre Tirard	13 December 1892	4 April 1893
Paul Peytral	4 April 1893	3 December 1893
Auguste Burdeau	3 December 1893	30 May 1894
Raymond Poincaré	30 May 1894	26 January 1895
Alexandre Ribot	26 January 1895	1 November 1895
Paul Doumer	1 November 1895	29 April 1896
Georges Cochery	29 April 1896	28 June 1898
Paul Peytral	28 June 1898	22 June 1899
Joseph Caillaux	22 June 1899	7 June 1902
Maurice Rouvier	7 June 1902	17 June 1905
Pierre Merlou	17 June 1905	14 March 1906
Raymond Poincaré	14 March 1906	25 October 1906
Joseph Caillaux	25 October 1906	24 July 1909
Georges Cochery	24 July 1909	3 November 1910
Louis Lucien Klotz	3 November 1910	2 March 1911
Joseph Caillaux	2 March 1911	27 June 1911
Louis Lucien Klotz	27 June 1911	22 March 1913
Charles Dumont	22 March 1913	9 December 1913
Joseph Caillaux	9 December 1913	17 March 1914
René Renoult	17 March 1914	9 June 1914
Étienne Clémentel	9 June 1914	13 June 1914
Joseph Noulens	13 June 1914	26 August 1914
Alexandre Ribot	26 August 1914	20 March 1917
Joseph Thierry	20 March 1917	12 September 1917
Louis Lucien Klotz	12 September 1917	20 January 1920
Frédéric François-Marsal	20 January 1920	16 January 1921
Paul Doumer	16 January 1921	15 January 1922
Charles de Lasteyrie	15 January 1922	29 March 1924
Frédéric François-Marsal	29 March 1924	14 June 1924
Étienne Clémentel	14 June 1924	3 April 1925
Anatole de Monzie	3 April 1925	17 April 1925
Joseph Caillaux	17 April 1925	29 October 1925
Paul Painlevé	29 October 1925	28 November 1925
Louis Loucheur	28 November 1925	16 December 1925
Paul Doumer	16 December 1925	9 March 1926
Raoul Péret	9 March 1926	23 June 1926
Joseph Caillaux	23 June 1926	19 July 1926
Anatole de Monzie	19 July 1926	23 July 1926
Raymond Poincaré	23 July 1926	11 November 1928
Henry Chéron	11 November 1928	21 February 1930
Charles Dumont	21 February 1930	2 March 1930
Paul Reynaud	2 March 1930	13 December 1930
Louis Germain-Martin	13 December 1930	27 January 1931
Pierre Étienne Flandin	27 January 1931	3 June 1932
Louis Germain-Martin	3 June 1932	18 December 1932
Henry Chéron	18 December 1932	31 January 1933
Georges Bonnet	31 January 1933	30 January 1934
François Piétri	30 January 1934	4 February 1934
Paul Marchandeau	4 February 1934	9 February 1934
Louis Germain-Martin	9 February 1934	1 June 1935
Joseph Caillaux	1 June 1935	7 June 1935
Marcel Régnier	7 June 1935	4 June 1936
Vincent Auriol	4 June 1936	22 June 1937
Georges Bonnet	22 June 1937	18 January 1938
Paul Marchandeau	18 January 1938	13 March 1938
Léon Blum	13 March 1938	10 April 1938
Paul Marchandeau	10 April 1938	1 November 1938
Paul Reynaud	1 November 1938	21 March 1940
Lucien Lamoureux	21 March 1940	5 June 1940
Yves Bouthillier	5 June 1940	18 April 1942
Pierre Cathala	18 April 1942	19 August 1944

== Free French Commissioners of Finance, 1941–1944 ==
Commissioner	Term start	Term end
René Pleven	24 September 1941	17 October 1942
André Diethelm	17 October 1942	7 June 1943
Maurice Couve de Murville	7 June 1943	9 November 1943
Pierre Mendès-France	9 November 1943	4 September 1944

== Ministers of Finance, 1944–present ==
Minister	Term start	Term end
Aimé Lepercq	4 September 1944	9 November 1944
René Pleven	16 November 1944	26 January 1946
André Philip	26 January 1946	24 June 1946
Robert Schuman	24 June 1946	18 December 1946
André Philip	18 December 1946	22 January 1947
Robert Schuman	22 January 1947	24 November 1947
René Mayer	24 November 1947	26 July 1948
Paul Reynaud	26 July 1948	5 September 1948
Christian Pineau	5 September 1948	11 September 1948
Henri Queuille	11 September 1948	12 January 1949
Maurice Petsche	12 January 1949	11 August 1951
René Mayer	11 August 1951	20 January 1952
Edgar Faure	20 January 1952	8 March 1952
Antoine Pinay	8 March 1952	8 January 1953
Maurice Bourgès-Maunoury	8 January 1953	28 June 1953
Edgar Faure	28 June 1953	20 January 1955
Robert Buron	20 January 1955	23 February 1955
Pierre Pflimlin	23 February 1955	1 February 1956
Robert Lacoste	1 February 1956	14 February 1956
Paul Ramadier	14 February 1956	13 June 1957
Félix Gaillard	13 June 1957	6 November 1957
Pierre Pflimlin	6 November 1957	14 May 1958
Edgar Faure	14 May 1958	1 June 1958
Antoine Pinay	1 June 1958	13 January 1960
Wilfrid Baumgartner	13 January 1960	19 January 1962
Valéry Giscard d'Estaing	19 January 1962	8 January 1966
Michel Debré	8 January 1966	30 May 1968
Maurice Couve de Murville	30 May 1968	10 July 1968
François-Xavier Ortoli	10 July 1968	16 June 1969
Valéry Giscard d'Estaing	16 June 1969	28 May 1974
Jean-Pierre Fourcade	28 May 1974	27 August 1976
Raymond Barre	27 August 1976	5 April 1978
René Monory	5 April 1978	22 May 1981
Jacques Delors	22 May 1981	19 July 1984
Pierre Bérégovoy	19 July 1984	20 March 1986
Édouard Balladur	20 March 1986	12 May 1988
Pierre Bérégovoy	12 May 1988	2 April 1992
Michel Sapin	2 April 1992	29 March 1993
Edmond Alphandéry	29 March 1993	18 May 1995
Alain Madelin	18 May 1995	25 August 1995
Jean Arthuis	25 August 1995	4 June 1997
Dominique Strauss-Kahn	4 June 1997	2 November 1999
Christian Sautter	2 November 1999	28 March 2000
Laurent Fabius	28 March 2000	7 May 2002
Francis Mer	7 May 2002	31 March 2004
Nicolas Sarkozy	31 March 2004	28 November 2004
Hervé Gaymard	30 November 2004	25 February 2005
Thierry Breton	25 February 2005	18 May 2007
Jean-Louis Borloo	18 May 2007	19 June 2007
Christine Lagarde	19 June 2007	29 June 2011
François Baroin	29 June 2011	15 May 2012
Pierre Moscovici	16 May 2012	31 March 2014
Michel Sapin	2 April 2014	17 May 2017
Bruno Le Maire	17 May 2017	21 September 2024
Antoine Armand	21 September 2024	23 December 2024
Éric Lombard	23 December 2024	5 October 2025
Roland Lescure	5 October 2025	Incumbent

== See also ==
- Government of France
- List of budget ministers of France
