= Armand de Vignerot du Plessis (disambiguation) =

Armand de Vignerot du Plessis, duke of Richelieu (Louis François Armand, 1696–1788) was a French soldier and statesman.

Armand de Vignerot du Plessis may also refer to:

- Armand Jean de Vignerot du Plessis, duke of Richelieu (1629–1715), nobleman and naval officer
- Armand-Louis de Vignerot du Plessis (1683–1750), duke of Aiguillon
- Emmanuel-Armand de Richelieu, duc d'Aiguillon (Emmanuel-Armand de Vignerot du Plessis de Richelieu, 1720–1788), soldier and politician
- Armand, duc d'Aiguillon (Armand-Désiré de Vignerot du Plessis de Richelieu, 1761–1800), soldier and politician
- Armand-Emmanuel de Vignerot du Plessis, duc de Richelieu (1766–1822), statesman
