= Duc d'Aiguilion =

The French title Duc d'Aiguilion may refer to any one of its holders:

- Charles of Lorraine, Duke of Mayenne 1599–1611
- Henry Duke of Mayenne 1611–1621 (son of Charles duke of Mayenne)

Incorporated to the French crown 1621–1638. Cardinal Richelieu purchased this dukedom in 1638 and gave it to Marie Madeleine, the daughter of René Vignerot and his wife Françoise du Plessis, sister of Richelieu:

- Marie Madeleine De Vignerot De Plessis 1638–1675
- Terese d'Aiguillon 1675–1731 (niece of Marie Madeleine)
- Armand I d'Aiguillon 1731–1750 (nephew of Terese)
- Emmanuel-Armand de Richelieu, duc d'Aiguillon 1750–1788 (son of Armand)
- Armand, duc d'Aiguillon 1788–1789 (son of Emmanuel-Armand)

Suppressed by the French Revolution 1789.
