= Duke d'Aiguillon =

Duc d'Aiguillon may refer to:

- Emmanuel-Armand de Richelieu, duc d'Aiguillon (1720–1788), French soldier and statesman who served as minister of foreign affairs under Louis XV
- Armand, duc d'Aiguillon, (1750–1800), son of Emmanuel-Armand de Richelieu, succeeded his father in 1789 as a member of the National Assembly
