= Louise-Félicité de Bréhan =

- Duchesse d'Aiguillon, Duchesse d'Agénois
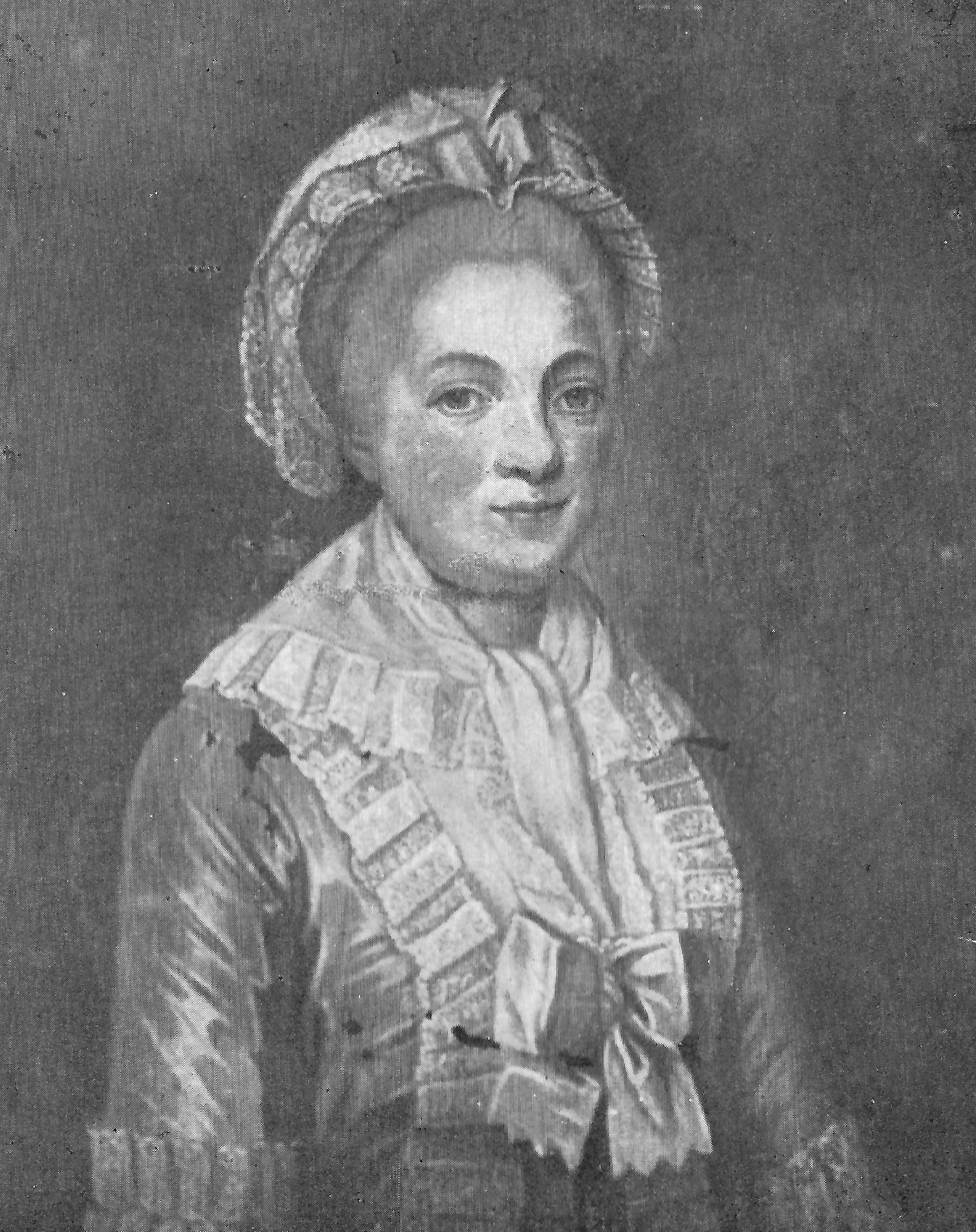
- Born: 30 November 1726
- Died: 15 September 1796 (aged 69)
- Spouse: Emmanuel Armand de Vignerot du Plessis, Duke of Aiguillon (m. 1740)
- Father: Louis de Bréhan, Comte de Plélo
- Mother: Louise-Françoise Phélypeaux de La Vrillière

Louise-Félicité de Bréhan de Plélo, duchesse d'Aiguillon (30 November 1726 – 15 September 1796) was a French noblewoman, courtier and letter writer.

== Biography ==
Louise-Félicité was the daughter of Louis de Bréhan, Comte de Plélo and Louise-Françoise Phélypeaux de La Vrillière. She was orphaned at the age of 11 and subsequently raised as the ward of her uncle, Jean Frédéric Phélypeaux, Count of Maurepas, at Pentemont Abbey.

On 4 February 1740 she married Emmanuel Armand de Vignerot du Plessis, Duke of Aiguillon. In 1748 Louise-Félicité was appointed a Dame du Palais to Marie Leszczyńska. She quickly became a favourite of the queen. At court, she was aligned with the so-called parti dévot, a faction opposed to the influence of Madame de Pompadour over Louis XV. The king regularly sought her advice on matters relating to Brittany, during which she was able to serve her husband's interests. From 1772, at the insistence of her husband, she was a friend and chaperone to Madame du Barry in official ceremonies.

In 1774, her husband was disgraced and forced to leave the French court following a public quarrel with Marie Antoinette. Louise-Félicité followed him on 2 June 1774 and took up residence in the dilapidated Château d'Aiguillon. During both her time at court and at Château d'Aiguillon, Louise-Félicité was a significant letter writer. Her writings include letters to Jean-François de la Cour de Balleroy, Madame de Chauvelin and the Baron de Scheffer.

Following the French Revolution, she emigrated briefly to England with the assistance of du Barry, but returned prior to 1 January 1792 to avoid being accused of the crime of lèse-nation. During the 1793 trial of du Barry, Antoine Quentin Fouquier-Tinville linked Louise-Félicité with the former king's mistress and she was arrested. On 1 February 1794, the Committee of General Security ordered that Louise-Félicité be transferred to the so-called English prison in Paris. On 21 October 1794 she was released by the revolutionary authorities and subsequently took up residence at Rueil-Malmaison as a farmer. She died in obscurity and relative poverty two years later in 1796.

From her marriage, Louise-Félicité had four children, two of whom reached adulthood. Her youngest son was Armand de Vignerot du Plessis, Duke of Aiguillon.
