= Anne-Charlotte de Crussol de Florensac =

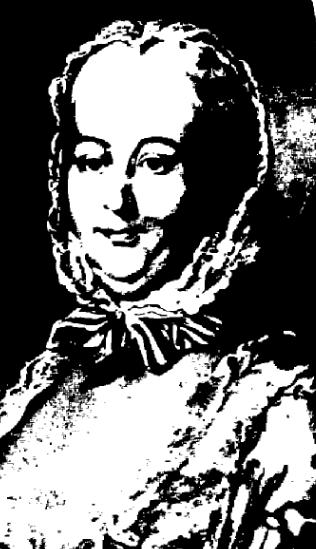
Anne Charlotte de Crussol, Duchess of Aiguillon

Anne-Charlotte de Crussol de Florensac, duchesse d'Aiguillon (1700–1772), was a lady of the court of Louis XV. Renowned for her wit, as a woman of letters and translator, she ran a literary salon and was associated with Montesquieu, the philosophers and the Encyclopédistes. It was to her that Montesquieu entrusted the manuscript of the Persian Letters (Lettres Persanes) for publication.

== Early life and education ==
Coat of Arms, Crussol

Anne-Charlotte de Crussol de Florensac was the daughter of Louis de Crussol (c.1645-1716), marquis de Florensac, maréchal de camp, and Marie-Thérèse-Louise de Senneterre de Châteauneuf vicomtesse de L'Estrange et de Cheylane.

Anne-Charlotte's youth was marked by a pronounced taste for the study of science; she spoke several languages fluently.

== Marriage ==
Coat of arms, Duke of Aiguillon

At the age of 18, on August 22, 1718, she married Armand Louis de Vignerot du Plessis (1683-1750), Duke of Aiguillon, peer de France, man of letters, and member of the French Academy of Sciences. She was the mother of Emmanuel Armand de Vignerot du Plessis, Duke of Aiguillon (1720-1788), future General and Secretary of State for Foreign Affairs. In 1731, she became the third Duchesse d'Aiguillon.

== Career ==
=== Literary salon in Paris ===
The duchesse d'Aiguillon translated various English works, notably by Alexander Pope and James Macpherson. She held a literary salon in her hotel on Rue de l'Université, Paris, welcoming philosophers, economists and Encyclopédistes. She was renowned as a woman of wit, and became a fixture in Parisian literary circles. She was a friend of Montesquieu, Voltaire, Elisabet Planström, and philosophers. She was a guest at literary salons and the Grandes Nuits de Sceaux festivities of the Duchesse du Maine, in the Chevaliers de l'Ordre de la Mouche à Miel circle, at the Château de Sceaux.

=== Salon in Bordeaux; the Persian Letters ===
Mindful of her own interests, the Duchesse d'Aiguillon kept a watchful eye on her estates, making frequent visits to Aiguillon in Guyenne. In her husband's stead, she kept a close eye on the many lawsuits against the Duchy of Aiguillon, and encouraged the prosecutors and lawyers. She also took advantage of these occasions to hold evening salons in Bordeaux, or to visit her friend Montesquieu in La Brède.

Shortly before his death, Montesquieu entrusted the Duchesse d'Aiguillon with the corrected manuscript of Lettres Persanes, telling her: "Consult with my friends, and judge whether this should appear".

== Later life ==
After her husband's death in 1750, she became dowager duchess and lost interest in the duchy, which reverted to her son, Emmanuel Armand. She spent the rest of her life at her home in Rueil and her hotel in the Faubourg Saint-Germain.

She died of apoplexy in 1772 in a bath taken after indigestion.

== Selected works ==
=== Translations ===
- Translation of l'Épître d'Héloïse à Abélard, by Alexander Pope, Paris, Tilliard, 1758.
- Translation of Carthon, translated from Macpherson's English by Madame de *** [François-Louis-Claude Marin and Anne-Charlotte de Crussol-Florensac, duchesse d'Aiguillon], London, Paris, 1762.
