= Vingtième =

The vingtième (French pronunciation: [vɛ̃tjɛm], twentieth) was an income tax of the ancien régime in France. It was abolished during the French Revolution.

== First Proposition ==
It was first proposed by the minister of finance, Jean-Baptiste de Machault, comte d'Arnouville, in 1749. The War of the Austrian Succession had just ended, with the French government at the point of bankruptcy. A temporary income tax, the dixième (levied by Louis XIV in 1710 at the rate of one-tenth of annual income), had been levied during the war, but Louis XV had promised that it would be removed with the end of the war. The comte d'Arnouville planned to introduce a new permanent tax modelled upon the dixième, to create a sinking fund to repay the national debt. The vingtième, introduced in 1749, was to be one-twentieth of annual income (5%), collected directly by the government, from all people regardless of their rank - although the First and Second Estates were largely exempt or could buy exemption through the payment of a 'Don Gratuit' ('free gift' to the Crown).

== Legislation ==
Legislation establishing the new tax was put before the parlements for registration in 1749 and was briefly though vociferously opposed. The most determined objections came from the pays d'ètats, regions which traditionally avoided direct collection of similar taxes, the estates paying instead abonnements, or annual lump sum payments which usually ended up being much less than the proper amount collected individually.

After registration of the vingtième edicts by the parlements, the Languedoc estates voted to deny the government their usual annual payment, and were subsequently dissolved until 1752, the vingtième being collected directly by the royal intendant. In Brittany, the estates successfully prevented the collection of the new tax, leading to the imprisonment of several leading nobles.

Obtaining money from the clergy was to prove more difficult. The comte d'Arnouville estimated the taxable income of the clergy at the time at 114 million livres, and the average annual contribution made by the clergy to the government over the past fifty years was 3.65 million livres, falling somewhat short of the 5.7 million the vingtième would raise. At the Assembly of the Clergy in 1750, he requested a payment of 7.5 million livres over five years, to contribute to his sinking fund. Protests ensued when Louis pressed the issue, and the assembly was dissolved.

Opposition continued until the resignation of d'Arnouville from the ministry in 1754, whereupon his successor, Jean Moreau de Séchelles, relented and allowed the clergy to be exempt and the pays d'ètats of Brittany and Languedoc to contribute with a lump sum payment.

== Second Tax ==
A second vingtième was levied at the beginning of the Seven Years' War in 1756, in the fashion of the old dixième, and as the war continued, a third tax was levied in 1760. At the conclusion of the war both the war taxes were expected to be removed, but the ministry were pressed for funds. Finance minister Henri Léonard Jean Baptiste Bertin not only extended the second vingtième, but attempted to instigate a land survey for the proper assessment of the tax. Aware that this would greatly increase their payments, the parlements resisted. Louis forced the legislation through the Paris parlement with a lit de justice, but continued opposition in the provinces led him to give way and dismiss Bertin, replacing him with Clément Charles François de Laverdy, a judge of the Paris Parlement. Although Laverdy allowed the extension of the second vingtième, he ensured it would be on the old property assessments, meaning it would not increase over time with the national income.

Although some improvements in the assessments were managed under the radical reforming administration of Maupeou and Terray, the taxes remained inefficient. In 1778 the Paris Parlement had demanded, without success, that the government should accept without contest the declarations of individual taxpayer. In 1780 Jacques Necker registered another extension of the second vingtième without difficulty.

== Abolishment of Taxes ==
The two vingtièmes were to be abolished and replaced with a new tax under Charles Alexandre de Calonne's reform plans of 1786. After his failure to convince the Assembly of Notables of his reforms, and his subsequent resignation, the new finance minister Étienne Charles Loménie de Brienne largely adopted his plans. After a first attempt in June 1787, Louis XVI and de Brienne forced the registration of the reforms at Paris on August 6, 1787. A public controversy ensued, with the parlement declaring the legislation illegal. Louis exiled the parlementaires to the provinces, but de Brienne eventually settled the matter with a compromise consisting of yet another extension of the second vingtième in September.

The vingtièmes were finally abolished by the National Assembly in 1790, along with all the other vestiges of the taxation system of the ancien régime.
