= Étienne Maynon d'Invault =

French statesman (1721–1801)

Controller-General of Finances
- In office 22 September 1768 – 19 December 1769
- Monarch: Louis XV
- Preceded by: Clément Charles François de Laverdy
- Succeeded by: Joseph Marie Terray

Minister of State
- In office 19 December 1768 – 19 December 1769
- Monarch: Louis XV

Counselor of State
- In office 7 November 1767 – ?

Steward of Picardy
- In office August 1754 – ?

President of the Grand Council
- In office 1753–?

Personal details
- Born: 1721 Paris, Kingdom of France
- Died: 1801 (aged 79–80) Saint-Germain-en-Laye, France
- Occupation: Statesman

Étienne Maynon d'Invault (1721–1801) was a French statesman.

== Early life ==
He was born in 1721 in Paris.

He was the son of Vincent Maynon of Invault and Agnes Bouvard Fourqueux.

== Career ==
He was an advisor to the Investigations of the Parlement of Paris in 1741. He was then master of requests (4 March 1747 – 29 January 1766), president of the Grand Council (1753), steward of Picardy in Amiens (August 1754). Appointed State supernumerary on 5 October 1766, he became Counselor of State on 7 November 1767.

He was appointed Comptroller General of Finance on 22 September 1768 and Minister of State on 19 December 1768.

He proposed extending the second Vingtième until 1772, which raised strong remonstrances of the Parliaments and drove Louis XV to hold a lit de justice on 11 January 1769 to register the edict.

He used the ordinary expedients while preparing drastic measures that should be discussed on 19 December 1769. The Boards of Finance gathered together in a committee comprising members of both Councils. Following this meeting, Louis XV decided not to submit the measures envisaged in the expanded Council, which led to his resignation on 19 December 1769.

== Personal life and death ==
In 1758, he married his cousin Elizabeth Adelaide Bouvard Fourqueux.

He died in 1801 in Saint-Germain-en-Laye.

Political offices
| Preceded by Clément Charles François de Laverdy | Controllers-General of Finances; 22 September 1768 – 19 December 1769 | Succeeded by Joseph Marie Terray |
