= Pierre Sylvain Dumon =

French politician (1797–1870)

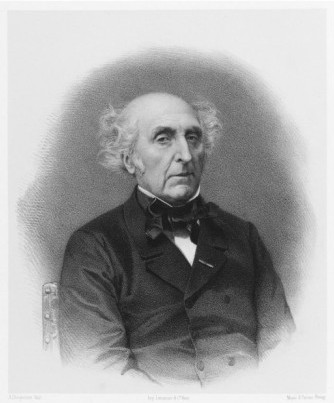

Minister of Public Works
- In office 16 December 1843 – 9 May 1847
- Preceded by: Jean-Baptiste Teste
- Succeeded by: Hippolyte Paul Jayr

Minister of Finance
- In office 9 May 1847 – 24 February 1848
- Preceded by: Jean Lacave-Laplagne
- Succeeded by: Michel Goudchaux

Personal details
- Born: 14 February 1797 Agen, Lot-et-Garonne, France
- Died: 24 February 1870 (aged 73) Paris, France
- Occupation: Lawyer

Pierre Sylvain Dumon (14 February 1797 – 24 February 1870) was a French politician who was a deputy from 1831 to 1848, and Minister of Finance in the last years of the July Monarchy.

== Early years ==
Pierre Sylvain Dumon was born in Agen, Lot-et-Garonne, on 14 February 1797. He studied at the Lycée Henri IV in Paris, then became a lawyer. Under the Bourbon Restoration he joined the bar of the Court of Paris in 1818. He became the secretary of the advocate Dupin the elder, who had defended Marshal Ney in 1815 and was the adviser of the Duke of Orleans. He had liberal views and defended opponents of the regime. He pleaded in the case of the Saumur plot. He gained a distinguished reputation among the liberal advocates of Paris.

== July Monarchy ==
On 27 March 1831 Dumon was elected deputy for the 1st electoral college of Lot-et-Garonne (Agen). He took his seat with the liberal opposition. He was offered the position of General Counsel in Agen, which he refused. Dumoan was reelected on 5 July 1831. He was named Councillor of State on special duty in 1832. He was reelected on 12 November 1833 and in successive elections in 1834, 1837, 1839 and 1842. He sat with the Doctrinaires. He was vice-president of the legislative committee in 1840, and a member of the committee on Algeria in 1842.

Dumon accepted the position of Minister of Public Works on 16 December 1843, and was reelected on 13 January 1844 and on 1 August 1846. He was strongly opposed to state operation of the railways, and favored the monopoly of large companies. He invested much of his personal fortune in railways. This caused him to be violently attacked by the opposition. He also improved the network of roads and waterways. On 9 May 1847 he accepted Finance portfolio, and held this position at the time of the February Revolution of 1848. Dumon resisted change, and rejected proposals to adjust postal rates, and salt tax and cancellation of 3% annuities. He did request approval for increasing the amount of government debt. The government became increasingly unpopular as the economy struggled, the financial situation worsened and reforms were resisted.

Dumon was named a knight of the Legion of Honor in 1834 and a grand officer on 29 April 1846.

== Last years ==
The revolution of 1848 ended Dumon's political career. Fearing that he would be put on trial, and still faithful to the royal family, he fled to England. He returned to France in late December 1848 after the election of Louis-Napoleon Bonaparte as President of the Republic. He settled in his château of Castels near Agen, but often returned to England to visit the exiled royal family. He also spent time in Paris as a member of the Board of Directors of the P.L.M. Company. In 1859 he became a member of the Académie des Sciences Morales et Politiques (Academy of Moral and Political Sciences). Dumon died in Paris on 24 February 1870.

== Works ==
- Histoire financière de l'équilibre Des Budgets sous la monarchie de 1830 (1849). Paris, M.Lévy

== Sources ==
- Degert, abbé A. (1870). Revue de Gascogne. Impr. centrale.
- "Pierre-Sylvain DUMON". IGPDE. 14 August 2007.
- Robert, Adolphe; Cougny, Gaston (1889). "DUMON (Pierre Sylvain)". Dictionnaire des parlementaires français de 1789 à 1889. National Assembly of France.
