= Fampoux rail accident =

1846 railway incident in France

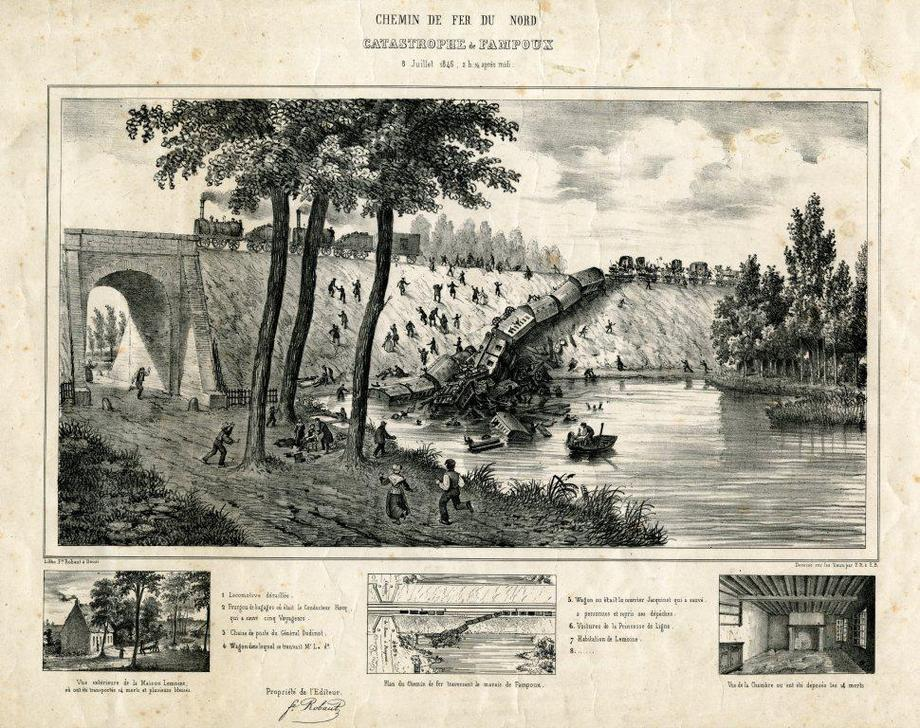
- Lithograph by Félix Robaut (1799–1880).

Details
- Date: July 8, 1846
- Location: Near the viaduct over the Scarpe, Fampoux, Pas-de-Calais
- Coordinates: 50°17′55.7″N 2°52′43.9″E
- Country: France
- Line: Paris–Lille railway
- Operator: Compagnie des chemins de fer du Nord
- Incident type: Derailment
- Cause: Not identified; probable excessive speed

Statistics
- Trains: 1
- Deaths: 14
- Injured: about 40

The Fampoux rail accident, also called the Fampoux disaster, took place in northern France, on 8 July 1846, in the territory of the commune of Pas-de-Calais, when on the newly opened Paris–Lille railway, the deadly derailment of a train killed fourteen people and injured around forty.

== Circumstances ==
=== Information reporting ===
At the time, the electric telegraph between Paris and Lille was still a project, and news of the event was therefore transmitted late and imprecisely, both by authorities and by the national and regional press. However, by cross-checking sources, especially judicial ones, the essential facts can be reconstructed.

=== A recently opened line ===
The State had built in successive sections the infrastructure of the Paris–Lille line and its extension to the Belgian State network and Brussels, and was authorized to grant it by a law of 15 July 1845. On 9 September 1845, the Minister of Public Works awarded the concession to “Messrs. de Rothschild frères, Hottinguer et compagnie, Charles Laffitte, Blount et compagnie”, who, after some legal-financial difficulties, created the Compagnie des chemins de fer du Nord on 20 September 1845. Once the line was equipped, a ministerial decree of 31 May 1846, made enforceable by the prefects of each department crossed, provisionally organized its general policing, before its grand inauguration on 14 and 15 June 1846, and its opening to the public five days later.

To meet the enthusiasm for the new mode of transport, while capacity was still limited by single-track or unfinished sections, during the first weeks of operation the company had to run long, heavy trains, requiring double-headed locomotives.

On Wednesday 8 July 1846-, a convoy combining trains for Lille and Valenciennes left Paris-Nord station at 7. Due to its size and weight, it was hauled by two steam locomotives, and five of its wagons had brakemen. It included twenty-six vehicles, including baggage vans, passenger coaches of all three classes, and nine flat wagons (trucks) carrying stagecoaches, post chaises, and traveling berlines of various notables.

At Amiens, during reversal, two trucks were added, including one carrying a Rouen–Lille diligence.

=== The accident ===
About eight kilometers after Gare d'Arras, which it left at 15:45, the train, now hauled by locomotive No. 44 followed by No. 48, had just descended a 4‰ grade before the viaduct over the Scarpe and was climbing a 4.5‰ embankment built across marshland before Rœux station. At 15:55, a violent jolt occurred at the front. While the first engine stayed on track, the second, whose driver immediately reversed steam, derailed, dragging the following vehicles. Of the two baggage vans, only the first remained attached and stopped with the locomotives about 200 meters further on. The coupling bar of the second broke, and the rest of the train ran a hundred meters on the ballast before veering left down the seven-meter embankment. Thirteen wagons tumbled pell-mell down the slope. Four plunged into a pond formed by an abandoned peat bog, sinking in 3–4 m of water. Five more fell in but floated on debris; the last four overturned on the slope.

The rest of the train stayed on the embankment; the last eight wagons did not derail.

=== Rescue efforts ===
Immediately after the crash, uninjured passengers tried to free victims from the wreckage, and some were praised by the press for acts of courage. The wife and daughter of the marquis d’Audiffret were rescued from their submerged coach by an English passenger.

Train staff also distinguished themselves. The conductor. of the front van, Benoît Hocq, dived in and saved eight people, earning a medal and a Montyon Prize Greaser Carré, thrown from his footboard, plunged back and saved five. Sub-inspector Pierre Hovelt, acting as train chief, after escaping his submerged coach, organized rescue efforts.

Local residents also helped: peat workers came with boats and tools, saving many from drowning. They rescued Dr. Lestiboudois, MP and physician, who then treated victims, including Oudinot’s aide-de-camp, gravely injured. About forty injured received care at Fampoux and Rœux. Some remained locally, others were sent to hospitals in Arras and Douai.

L’Indépendance belge criticized local peasants for offering little aid.

By evening, two relief trains brought doctors, army engineers, hussars, and officials including the mayor of Arras and the public prosecutor. Some wagons were re-railed and traffic resumed on the adjacent track.

The next day, a Brussels–Paris train struck a crane used for clearing, injuring three soldiers, one later amputated. This caused an outcry and legal actions.

On 11 July, Minister of Public Works Pierre Sylvain Dumon visited the site.

=== Casualties ===
A few hours after the accident, eleven bodies had been laid on the embankment and three others located among the wreckage. Although the recovery of the carriages had not yet begun, the authorities initially announced a death toll of 14.

This figure was immediately disputed. Witnesses claimed that the three sunken carriages had been full of passengers, including about fifteen remplaçants (contractual substitutes engaged by conscripts for military service), and that many bodies remained trapped in the marsh. Others reported that the toll had risen with the deaths of severely injured passengers, such as M. Bertrand d’Aigny, aide-de-camp to General Oudinot. According to the Journal de la Somme, three wounded victims succumbed in the following days, bringing the total to 17.

Some newspapers suggested even higher figures. A reader of Le Siècle claimed, as an “eyewitness,” that the number of dead was “at least triple” the official count, while other reports mentioned 35 fatalities or 58 missing.

The company and local authorities rejected these rumors, much as they had done after the Versailles rail accident four years earlier. For example, they denied the reported death of General Oudinot’s aide-de-camp, and explained that the carriage supposedly carrying remplaçants contained only baggage. A week later, after soldiers had searched the marsh, officials reported that no additional bodies were found.

Despite these denials, rumors of as many as 200 deaths persisted up to the opening of the trial in November. At the first hearing, the King’s prosecutor dismissed such figures as “exaggerations” and confirmed the official toll of 14 fatalities.

As for the wounded, the true number was estimated at around 40, although the court record noted only the most serious cases, stating that “ten persons were severely injured.”

== Aftermath ==
=== Reactions ===
Until 1838, the State had not ruled out granting itself a monopoly on the construction and operation of railways, but the law of 11 June 1842 finally established a mixed system whereby the State would build the infrastructure (trackbed and engineering works), but companies would lay track and operate the service.

The spectacular nature and heavy toll of the Fampoux accident, whose news reached the Bourse well before it was made public, gave the press an opportunity to comment on this formula associating public power with private enterprise.

Most newspapers merely noted the event while reminding the partners of their respective obligations. Thus, Le Siècle, monarchist, emphasized the responsibility of the State, writing: "It is said that the company is taking the necessary measures to prevent every kind of danger. We hope that the government will ensure this. It is particularly for it to provide, for it is responsible for the works for a year and at all times for public safety." The liberal Journal des débats politiques et littéraires stressed the duties of the companies: "We have been sincere supporters of the construction and operation of railways by the Companies; we still are, as much as ever. But we know, and will never forget, the obligations which the Companies contracted towards the public the day they accepted the contract granting them a railway."

In contrast with this cautious neutrality, the republican Le National, opposed to awarding railways to the private sector, noted ironically: "Thus begins Mr. Rothschild’s operation!" and indignantly exclaimed: "This Northern Railway has already caused in the financial world, as in the moral world, the most serious disorders; it has been one of the instruments of the most scandalous conversions in the Chamber; was it not enough to corrupt those it attracted? Must it, in the first days of its material existence, kill those who trust it?"

=== Assigning responsibility ===
Although the accident gave rise to numerous investigations, uncertainty would persist over its causes, but the courts eventually identified responsible parties.

==== Multiple investigations ====
The event prompted an unusually high number of inquiries, probably because of the issue of dividing responsibility between the State and its partner. The first analysis, from the Company and widely circulated in its communiqués, was contained in a detailed report sent two days later to his superiors by sub-inspector Hovelt, train chief. Next came a more detailed administrative report, drawn up at the request of the Minister of Public Works, Pierre Sylvain Dumon, by the divisional inspector of bridges and roads, Pierre-François Frissard, published on 13 July and reprinted in full in most national newspapers.

Two even more precise judicial expert reports followed, commissioned by the reporting judge of the Royal Court of Douai: the first, dated 26 July, by MM. Gillot and Beaumal, on the overall facts; the second, dated 22 and 26 July, by M. Le Gavrian, mechanical engineer, on the condition of the locomotives.

During the inquiries, many other expert engineers also took part, all State officials and most of whom had contributed to building the line.

==== Uncertainty about the causes ====
All the train’s occupants observed that as it approached the accident site, the wagons were affected by an abnormal lateral oscillation just before the impact that led to the derailment. Among the possible causes, one hypothesis was the subsidence of the embankment, built by the State on the unstable soil of the marsh eighteen months earlier, and handed over on 1 April 1846 to the Nord Company, which had laid the tracks there.

This was the explanation favored by the Company, which noted that other parts of the line delivered by the State exhibited similar defects, and suggested that it might seek damages from the State and call it in guarantee against possible judgments against the Company.

However, the official inquiries rejected this explanation. Thus, the administrative report of Pierre-Antoine Frissard, commissioned by the Minister, concluded: "The Fampoux catastrophe cannot be attributed either to the construction or the maintenance of the line. Its cause must therefore be sought elsewhere." The judicial report to the Royal Court of Douai reached the same conclusion, noting that the embankment soils "are now well settled, and no significant subsidence has been observed there for a long time"; differences in level had been detected, but they were considered minor and "could have had no influence on the accident."

If the oscillation that may have provoked the derailment was not due to the condition of the embankment, many other explanations were proposed during the inquiries and trials. The most decisive factor seemed to be the speed of the train, though it could only be estimated approximately in the absence of instruments. The 8 kilometres from the departure at Arras had been covered in an average of 22 km/h, but testimonies indicated that at the time of the accident, as the train emerged from a descent and entered a slight ascent, it was running at between 35 and 40 km/h. For most experts, such speed could only induce oscillation in a train with an asymmetrical centre of gravity, due to its mixed composition, including trucks carrying heavily loaded stagecoaches. It also greatly exceeded the 24 km/h limit imposed for double traction by Article 17 of the ministerial order of 31 May 1846, regulating police on the line, made enforceable by the prefect of Pas-de-Calais.

How speed and oscillation combined to cause the derailment remained conjectural. Some argued that at the transition from descent to ascent, the rear of the train exerted excessive pressure, forcing the leading vehicles off the track. Others claimed that the coupling bar between the first and second wagons broke and stuck in the ground, initially derailing those two vehicles. Still others suggested that the driver of the second locomotive, by reversing steam, created a sudden compression of the train, followed by a rebound that broke it apart.

Another view was that the track itself could not withstand "a train of enormous weight" moving at such speed, headed by two locomotives of 26 tonnes each. An expert reported that the tyre of a front wheel on the lead engine showed marks "of a considerable and instantaneous shock caused by contact with a hard body, such as the end of a rail," and since a rail with a chipped end was found at the site, it is possible that it had shifted out of alignment, protruded, and caused the derailment. This explanation seemed even more plausible as some wooden wedges securing the rails to their cast-iron chairs appeared to have sprung loose before the accident. A reader of La Presse, identifying himself as "head of service on one of our railways," suggested that the monitoring of rail expansion during hot weather had been insufficient.

Whatever the causes of the derailment, the investigating magistrates determined that responsibility should be limited to four employees of the Company who, in their view, could have played a decisive role in the train’s composition and operation. By judgment of the Royal Court of Douai on 20 August 1846, the following were brought before the Lille criminal court: Jules-Alexandre Petiet (33, operating engineer, responsible for overall organization of service), Pierre-Joseph Hovelt (37, sub-inspector, acting as train chief), Alexandre Duthoit (26, driver of the lead locomotive), and Antoine-François Bolu (46, driver of the second locomotive).

=== Trials ===
==== First instance ====
The trial was held from 11 to 15 November 1846. After lengthy debates with thirty-five witnesses, the King’s prosecutor sought the conviction of the four accused, whom he deemed responsible for the excessive speed that caused the accident. Their lawyer, Eugène Bethmont, who had already defended at the trial of the Versailles rail accident, contested the binding force of the ministerial order limiting speed, since Article 14 of the law of 15 July 1845 required such measures of railway policing to be enacted in the more formal form of a government regulation. Above all, he argued for doubt regarding the causes, declaring: "Will justice say here that speed explains everything? I do not think this is free of danger. If you are not sufficiently informed, let us wait. It is not for justice to set the example of such rashness. Justice must remember that it is feared and respected only when it renders its judgments with complete certainty. When society stands on one side, the criminal law in hand, and an individual on the other, and there is doubt, justice abstains… In doubt, it judges by abstaining." The court accepted this cautious approach and acquitted all four defendants. Although rendered after lengthy deliberation, the judgment was very brief and "dismissed all defendants without costs" on the grounds that although the catastrophe "had as its immediate cause a derailment (…) the cause of that derailment itself has, despite the greatest efforts of justice and the insufficient contribution of science, remained buried in the realm of conjecture, mostly irreconcilable with each other, excluding any culpability, and necessarily leading to doubt, and therefore to acquittal."

==== Appeal ====
Seeking that justice should, if not determine the causes of the accident, at least sanction an infraction, the public prosecutor appealed to the correctional appeals chamber of the Royal Court of Douai. The new trial, initially scheduled for 13 December, was postponed to 21 December, as the judges wished to visit the site beforehand. The case was heard in five sessions, but like the first instance, they could not resolve the uncertainties about the derailment’s causes. The King’s prosecutor therefore based his case primarily on the train’s speed of around 40 km/h, which he deemed criminally punishable on two grounds: principally, because it violated the ministerial order of 31 May 1846 limiting speed to 24 km/h for double traction, whose binding nature he affirmed; and subsidiarily, even if the order were not applicable, because such speed, given the train’s composition and the layout of the site, revealed culpable imprudence under Article 19 of the law of 15 July 1845 on railway policing.

In its ruling, delivered on Saturday 26 December 1846 after four hours’ deliberation, the court accepted this reasoning, declaring the ministerial order "legal and binding," but adding that "even supposing the regulation had no binding force, the absence of any rule should have been (…) an additional reason to reduce speed." Considering that inspector Hovelt, train chief, and driver Bolu of the second engine had no control over speed, it confirmed their acquittal. By contrast, it found guilty of involuntary manslaughter the operating engineer Petiet, who prescribed the speed, and the driver Duthoit of the lead locomotive, though it also found "in the disuse into which the regulation had fallen, and in the tolerance of the authorities, under whose eyes it was daily flouted, the existence of mitigating circumstances." Both were sentenced to fifteen days in prison and trial costs, with Petiet additionally fined 3,000 francs.

==== Appeal to the Court of Cassation ====
On 24 April 1847, the Court of Cassation partly upheld the appeal of the two convicted men, ruling that the ministerial order limiting speed had no legal force. However, it nonetheless rejected their appeal by validating the subsidiary reasoning that the Court of Appeal had carefully included in its judgment.

== See also ==
- List of rail accidents in France
