= Portrait of Joseph Marie Terray =

Painting by Alexander Roslin

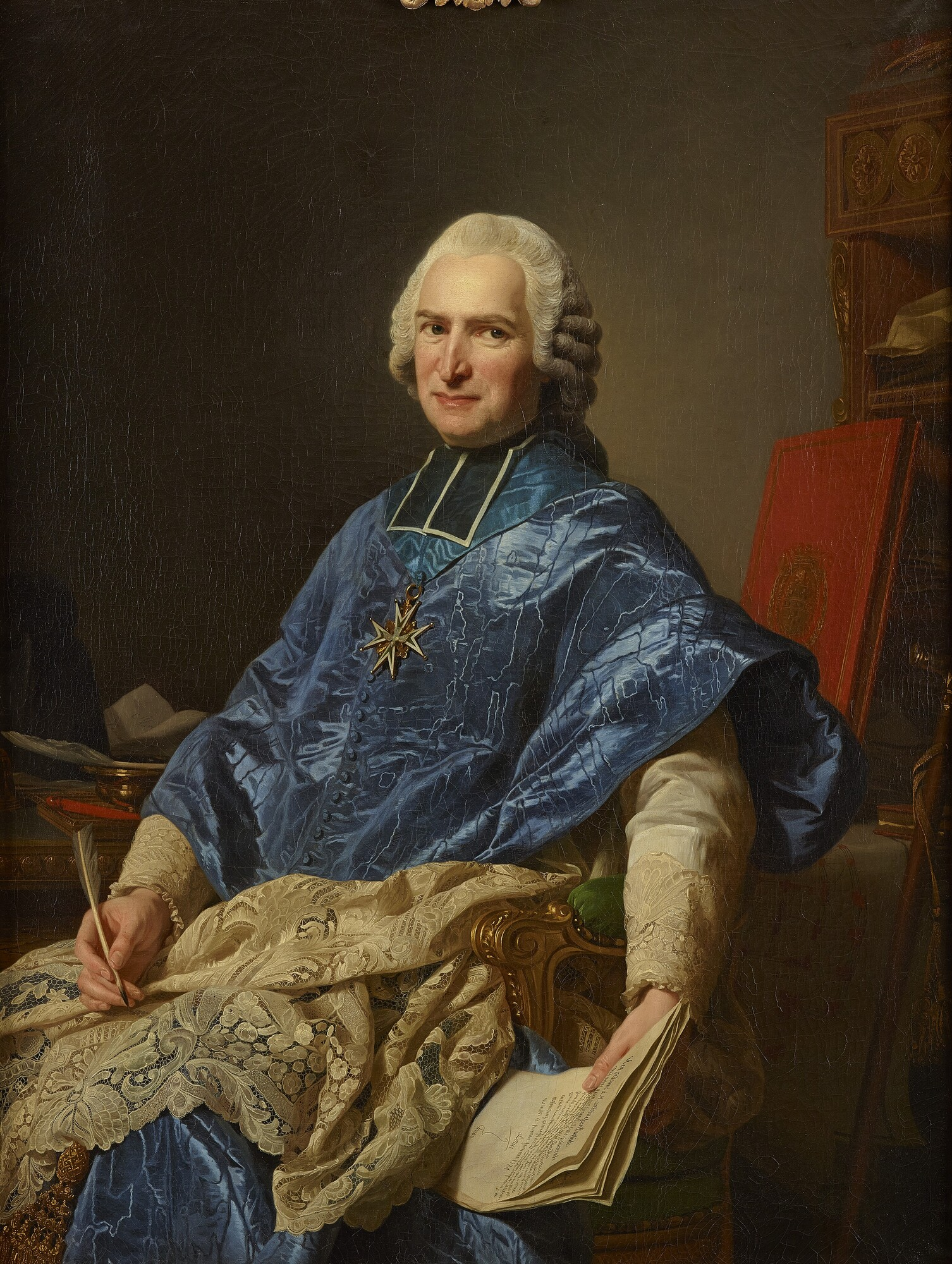
- Artist: Alexander Roslin
- Year: 1774
- Type: Oil on canvas, portrait painting
- Dimensions: 129 cm × 97 cm (51 in × 38 in)
- Location: Palace of Versailles; Versailles

Portrait of Joseph Marie Terray is a 1774 portrait painting by the Swedish artist Alexander Roslin. It depicts the French statesman Joseph Marie Terray. Terray held the roles of Controller-General of Finances from 1769 to 1774 as part of the Maupeou Triumvirate during the reign of Louis XV. A noted patron of the arts, he also served briefly as Bâtiments du Roi, but was dismissed from his offices after Louis XVI came to the throne.

Roslin was a noted portraitist who settled in Paris. He presented this as his diploma work on his admission to the French Royal Academy in 1774. Today the painting is in the collection of the Museum of French History at the Palace of Versailles.

== Bibliography ==
- Kahng, Eik & Michel, Marianne Roland . Anne Vallayer-Coster: Peintre à la cour de Marie-Antoinette. Musée des Beaux-Arts de Marseille, 2003.
- Levey, Michael. Painting and Sculpture in France, 1700-1789. Yale University Press, 1993.
- Olausson, Magnus & Salmon, Xavier (ed.) Alexandre Roslin, 1718-1793: Un Portraitiste Pour L'Europe. Réunion des musées nationaux, 2008.
