= Louis-René de Caradeuc de La Chalotais =

French jurist (1701–1785)

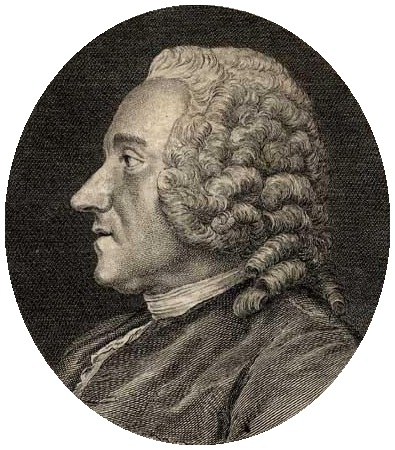
Louis-René de Caradeuc de La Chalotais.

Louis-René de Caradeuc de La Chalotais (March 6, 1701 – July 12, 1785) was a French jurist who is primarily remembered for his role on the so-called "Brittany Affair", in which the Breton Parlement resisted the authority of the French monarchy over an issue of taxation. The affair has been seen as a precursor of the French Revolution.

== Life ==
La Chalotais was born on March 6, 1701, in Rennes.

For 60 years, he was the general procurer (procureur général) at the parliament of Brittany. He was an ardent opponent of the Jesuits and drew up two memoirs on their constitutions (Comptes Rendus des Constitutions des Jesuites) in 1761 and 1762 that did much to secure the suppression of the Order in France. The next year, he published his Essay on National Education (Essai d'Éducation Nationale), which was extravagantly praised by Voltaire, in which he proposed a scientific programme of study to replace that previously offered by the Jesuits.

The same year began the conflict between the Estates of Brittany and the governor of the province, the duc d'Aiguillon. The Estates refused to vote the extraordinary imposts demanded by the governor in the name of the king. La Chalotais was the personal enemy of d'Aiguillon, who had served him an ill turn with the king, and when the parlement of Brittany sided with the Estates, he took the lead in its opposition. The parlement forbade by decrees the levy of imposts to which the Estates had not consented. The king annulling these decrees, all the members of the parlement but twelve resigned (October 1764 to May 1765). The government considered La Chalotais one of the authors of this affair.

At this time the secretary of state who administered the affairs of the province, Louis Phélypeaux, duc de la Vrilliere, comte de Saint-Florentin, received two anonymous and abusive letters. La Chalotais was suspected of having written them, and three experts in handwriting declared that they were by him. The government therefore arrested him, his son and four other members of the parliament. The arrest made a great sensation. There was much talk of "despotism". Voltaire stated that the procureur general, in his prison of Saint Malo, was reduced, for lack of ink, to write his defence with a toothpick dipped in vinegar. Apparently, this was pure legend, but public opinion all over France was strongly aroused against the government.

On November 16, 1765, a commission of judges was named to take charge of the trial. La Chalotais maintained that the trial was illegal; being procureur general he claimed the right to be judged by the parliament of Rennes, or failing this by the parliament of Bordeaux, according to the custom of the province. The judges did not dare to pronounce a condemnation on the evidence of experts in handwriting, and at the end of a year, things remained where they were at the first. Louis XV then decided on a sovereign act, and brought the affair before his council, which without further formality decided to send the accused into exile.

Louis's expedient only increased the popular agitation; philosophes, members of the parliament, Breton patriots and Jansenists all declared that La Chalotais was the victim of the personal hatred of the duc d'Aiguillon and of the Jesuits. The government at last gave way, and consented to recall the members of the parliament of Brittany who had resigned. This parliament, when it met again, after the formal accusation of the duc d'Aiguillon, demanded the recall of La Chalotais. This was accorded in 1775, and La Chalotais was allowed to transmit his office to his son. In this affair public opinion showed itself stronger than the absolutism of the king. The opposition to the royal power gained largely through it, and it may be regarded as one of the preludes to the revolution of 1789.

La Chalotais, who was personally a violent, haughty, and unsympathetic character, died at Rennes on July 12, 1785.
