= Jean-Élie Gautier =

French politician (1781–1858)

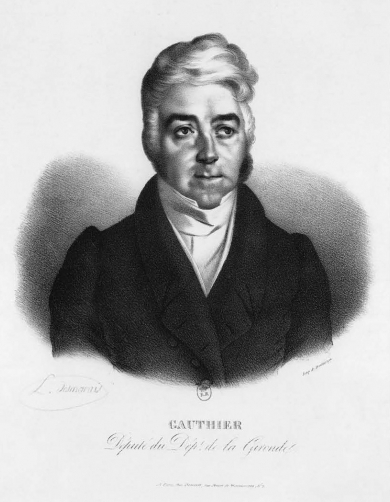
- Portrait by Desmarais
- Born: 6 October 1781; Bordeaux, Gironde, France
- Died: 30 January 1858 (aged 76); Paris, France
- Occupation: Politician
- Known for: Minister of Finance

Jean-Élie Gautier (6 October 1781 – 30 January 1858) was a French politician who was briefly Minister of Finance in 1839.

== Early years ==
Jean-Élie Gautier was born in Bordeaux, Gironde, on 6 October 1781. His father was Jean-Élie Gautier (1743–1828), a merchant in Bordeaux who was ennobled without a title by Louis XVIII in 1816. His mother was Marie-Emilie Laffon. The family was Protestant.

After completing his secondary education Gautier entered his father's business. He was a member of the General Council of the Gironde department from 1824 to 1829, from 1831 to 1833 and from 1839 to 1847. He was elected a deputy for Bordeaux on 25 February 1824, and sat with the majority. He participated in debates on financial issues, and was often the rapporteur of the budget. He was reelected on 17 November 1827, having sided against the press law, and sat with the liberal opposition. He was reelected in June 1830.

== July Monarchy ==
Gautier was elected President of the Commercial Court of Bordeaux from 1830 to 1832. He lost his seat as a deputy in July 1831. He was President of the Bordeaux Chamber of Commerce from 1831 to 1833. He became a member of the Board of Trade and Industry in 1832. On 11 October 1832 King Louis Philippe I made him a Peer of France. In the Upper House, he was noted for his skill in financial and business matters. In 1833 he was appointed deputy governor of the Bank of France under Barbe Marbois as governor. He remained in this post until his death.

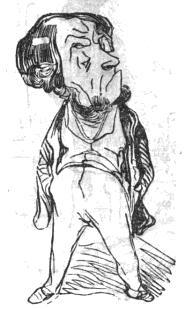
Caricature of Gautier as Minister of Finance (La Mode, 6 April 1839)

After elections early in 1839 which caused the second cabinet of Louis Mathieu Molé to resign, Louis Philippe could not form a ministry that would be able to obtain support of the majority of deputies. On 31 March 1839 he formed a transitional cabinet of technicians, with no president, in which Gautier was Minister of Finance. Since the post was temporary, Gautier did not initiate any important actions, apart from presenting the draft laws and budget prepared by his predecessor Jean Lacave-Laplagne. On 12 May 1839 he and his cabinet colleagues retired and a new cabinet was formed under Marshal Jean-de-Dieu Soult following an insurrection in Paris.

Until the February Revolution of 1848 Gautier continued to sit in the house of peers and to act as Deputy Governor of the Bank of France and member of the Board of Commerce and Industry. He was also Chairman of the Committee of invalids of the Navy.

== Later years ==
After the February Revolution Gautier lost his posts other than Deputy Governor of the Bank of France. He remained out of politics under the Second Republic, other than publishing a manifesto in 1851 that showed he was clearly aligned with the "party of order". After the coup d'état of 2 December 1851, on 26 January 1852 he was appointed to the Senate, remaining a senator in the Second Empire. The next year he again became a member of the Board of Trade and Industry. Gautier was also a member of the consistory of Paris, president of the Central Council of Reformed Churches and Commander of the Legion of Honor from 30 May 1837.

Jean-Élie Gautier died in Paris on 30 January 1858, aged 76.

== Publications ==
- Des banques et institutions de crédit en Amérique et en Europe (1839)
- De l’ordre, des causes qui le troublent et des moyens de le rétablir (1851)
