= French ship Indien =

Ship of the line of the French Navy

History

France
- Name: Indien
- Builder: Lorient
- Laid down: January 1768
- Launched: 30 July 1768
- In service: April 1770
- Out of service: November 1783
- Fate: Sold 1784

General characteristics
- Class & type: Indien class ship of the line
- Displacement: 2250 tonneaux
- Tons burthen: 1300 port tonneaux
- Length: 51.2 metres
- Beam: 13.2 metres
- Draught: 6.7 metres
- Propulsion: Sails
- Sail plan: Full-rigged ship

Indien was a 64-gun ship of the line of the French Navy, lead ship of her class. Originally built for the French East India Company, she was purchased by the Navy and saw service during the War of American Independence

== Career ==
Indien was built for the French East India Company at Lorient, and entered service for her first commercial journey in January 1769. After the collapse of the Company, the French Navy purchased in April 1770, and recommissioned her as a 68-gun ship of the line.

Indien took part in the Battle of Ushant on 27 July 1778, under La Grandière, as the lead ship in the 3rd Division of the White-and-Blue squadron of the French fleet.

In 1780, under Captain Balleroy, she was part of Guichen's squadron, and she took part in the Battle of Martinique on 17 April 1780, as well as in the actions of 15 May and 19 May 1780.

Captained by Laubépine, she was later attached to the combined French-Spanish fleet under Córdova.

== Fate ==
After returning to France, Indien was condemned in Toulon in 1783. She was sold in 1784.
