= Louis François de Monteynard =

French soldier and politician

Most High and Potent Lord The Marquis of Monteynard
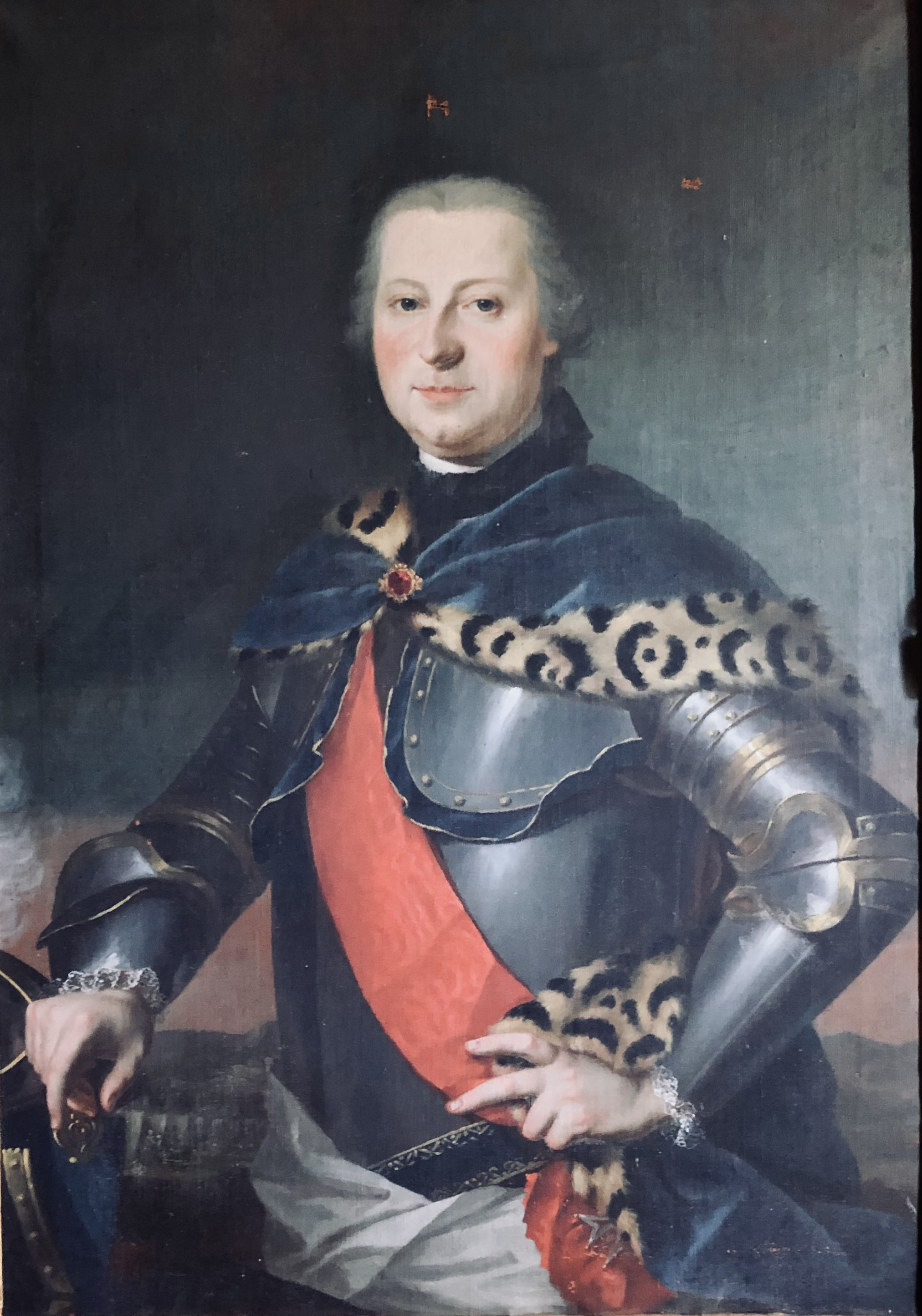

Secretary of State for War
- In office 4 January 1771 – 28 January 1774
- Monarch: Louis XV
- Preceded by: Louis Phélypeaux
- Succeeded by: Emmanuel-Armand de Richelieu

Personal details
- Born: 13 May 1713 La Pierre, Dauphiné, Kingdom of France
- Died: 3 May 1791 (aged 77) Paris, Isle-de-France, Kingdom of France

Military service
- Allegiance: Kingdom of France
- Branch/service: (Kingdom of France) Royal French Army
- Years of service: 1727–1771
- Rank: Lieutenant General
- Unit: Royal Vessels Infantry Regiment
- Battles/wars: Second Hundred Years' War; War of the Polish Succession; War of the Austrian Succession; Seven Years' War

Louis François, marquis de Monteynard (13 May 1713, in La Pierre, Isère – 3 May 1791, in Paris) was a French soldier and statesman.

== Life ==
At the age of 14, he enlisted in the Royal Regiment des Vaisseaux, a regiment commanded by his cousin, the Chevalier de Marcieu. He participated in all major campaigns of Louis XV, on the battlefields of Italy, Austria, on the island of Minorca, Germany and Holland.

In 1759, he became Lieutenant General, the highest military rank in the period before the title of Marshal of France. In 1771, he was called by Louis XV to replace Duc de Choiseul to the position of Secretary of State for War. In the three years of his ministry, he called for many actions to improve the lot of soldiers. He was cited as an example in the Voltaire's dictionary of philosophy. He also became the first governor general of the Corsica, and was the creator of the cavalry school of Saumur, which gave birth after the Revolution, to the Cadre Noir.

In the Dauphiné region, he was one of the underwriters of the Public Library Grenoble. In 1771, at the request of the consuls from Grenoble, he opposed the removal of the Parliament of the Dauphiné in Valencia. Their debates were held at the Hotel de Grenoble.

From 1773 he devoted himself to his homeland. At the Pierre, he rebuilt the parsonage. In 1775, he constructed the castle Cruzille in Tencin, where he never had the chance to live.

He died in Paris during the French Revolution. In defiance of laws prohibiting burials in churches in 1788, he was buried within the Church of Jacobins, by the poor of his district and former soldiers.

== Bibliography ==
- (in French) Perrin, Bernard, Dans l'ombre de l'Histoire : Louis-François de Monteynard, un exemple pour l’Europe, La Pierre, L'ombre de l'Histoire, [2001]

Political offices
Preceded by Étienne-François de Choiseul	Secretary of State for War; 1771–1774	Succeeded by Emmanuel–Armand Vignerot du Plessis
