= Maupeou Triumvirate =

Powerful trio of ministers that ruled Ancien Regime France from 1771 to 1774

The Maupeou Triumvirate was the powerful trio of ministers that ruled Ancien Regime France from 1771 to 1774. They came to power in 1771 following a coup orchestrated by René Nicolas Charles Augustin de Maupeou. Maupeou became Lord Chancellor and Keeper of the Seals, Joseph Marie Terray became Controller-General of Finances, and the Duc d'Aiguillon became foreign minister. The Triumvirate was strongly disliked by the general public, in part because of Maupeou's dismissal of both the Paris and provincial parlements, which he replaced with restructured and weakened bodies. By 1774, the year of Louis XV's death, factional infighting had divided the three ministers and weakened their collective power. Despite some successes, most notably Terray's relative stabilization of France's abysmal finances, the Triumvirate marked the failure of enlightened despotism in the Old Regime. The Triumvirate was overturned in 1774 with the king's death and the ascension of Maurepas.

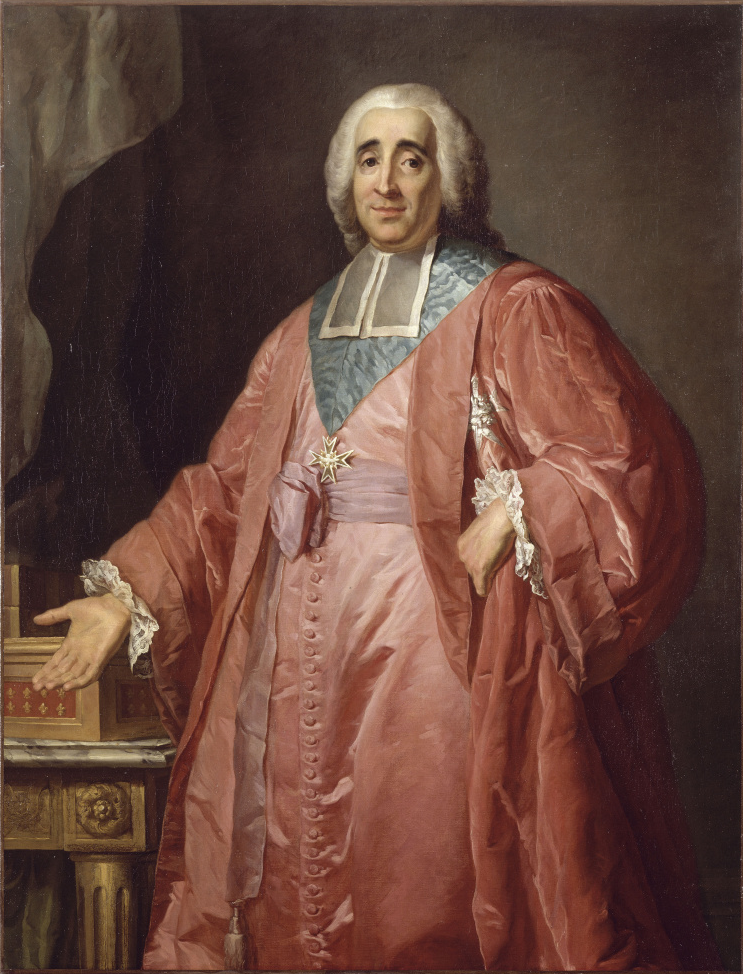
René Nicolas de Maupeou

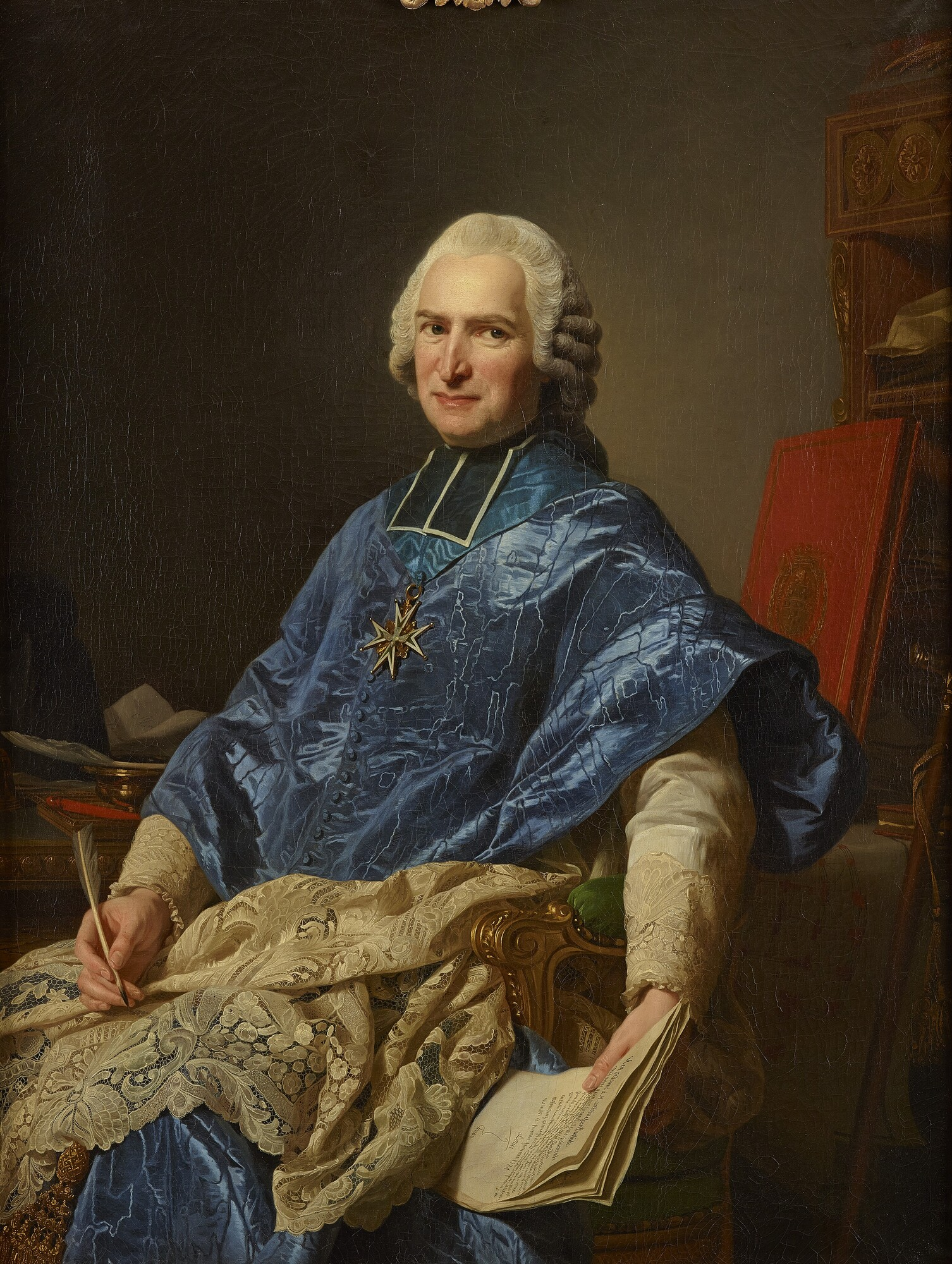
Joseph Marie Terray by Alexander Roslin, 1774

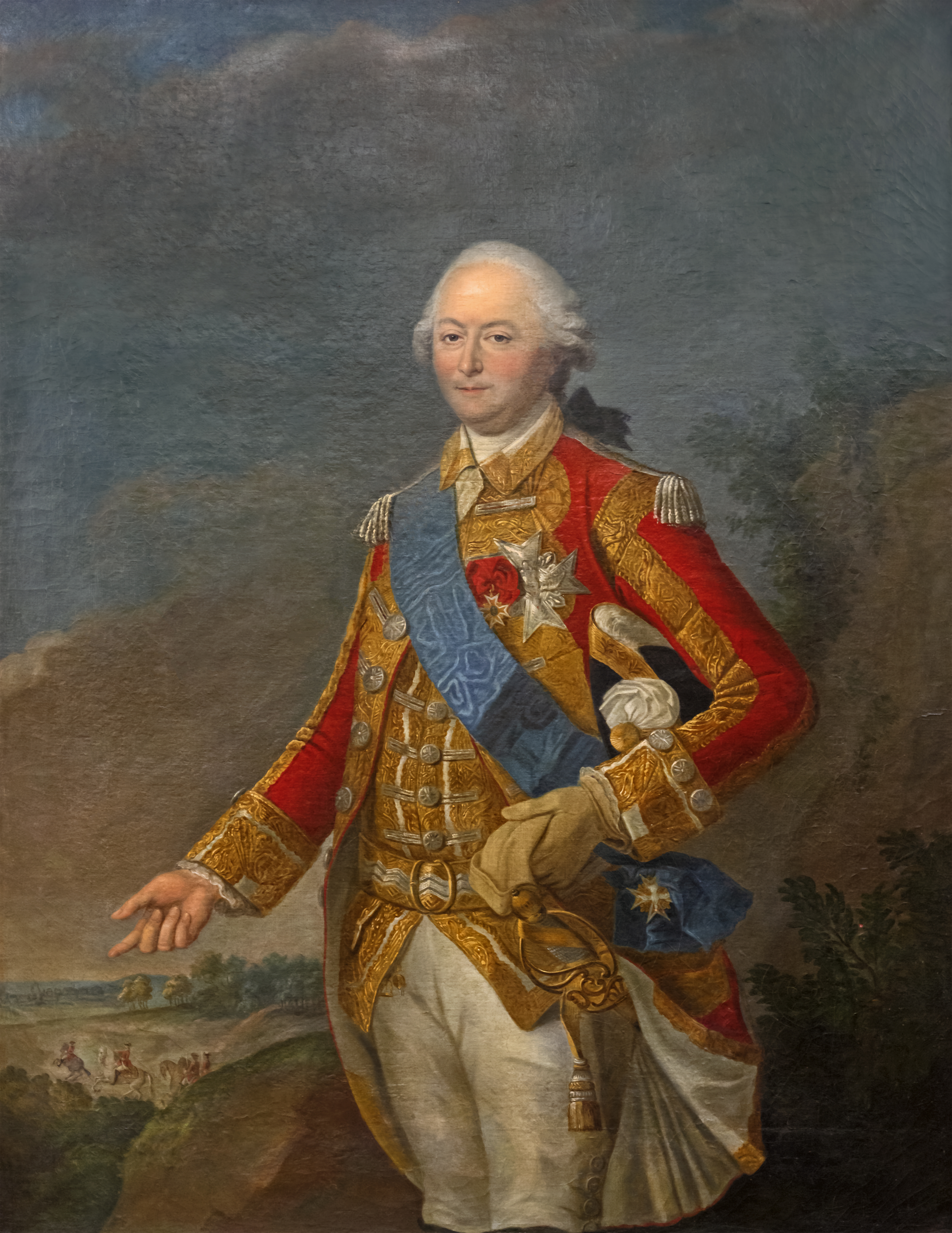
Duc d'Aiguillon
