= Joseph Dominique, baron Louis =

French statesman and financier (1755–1837)

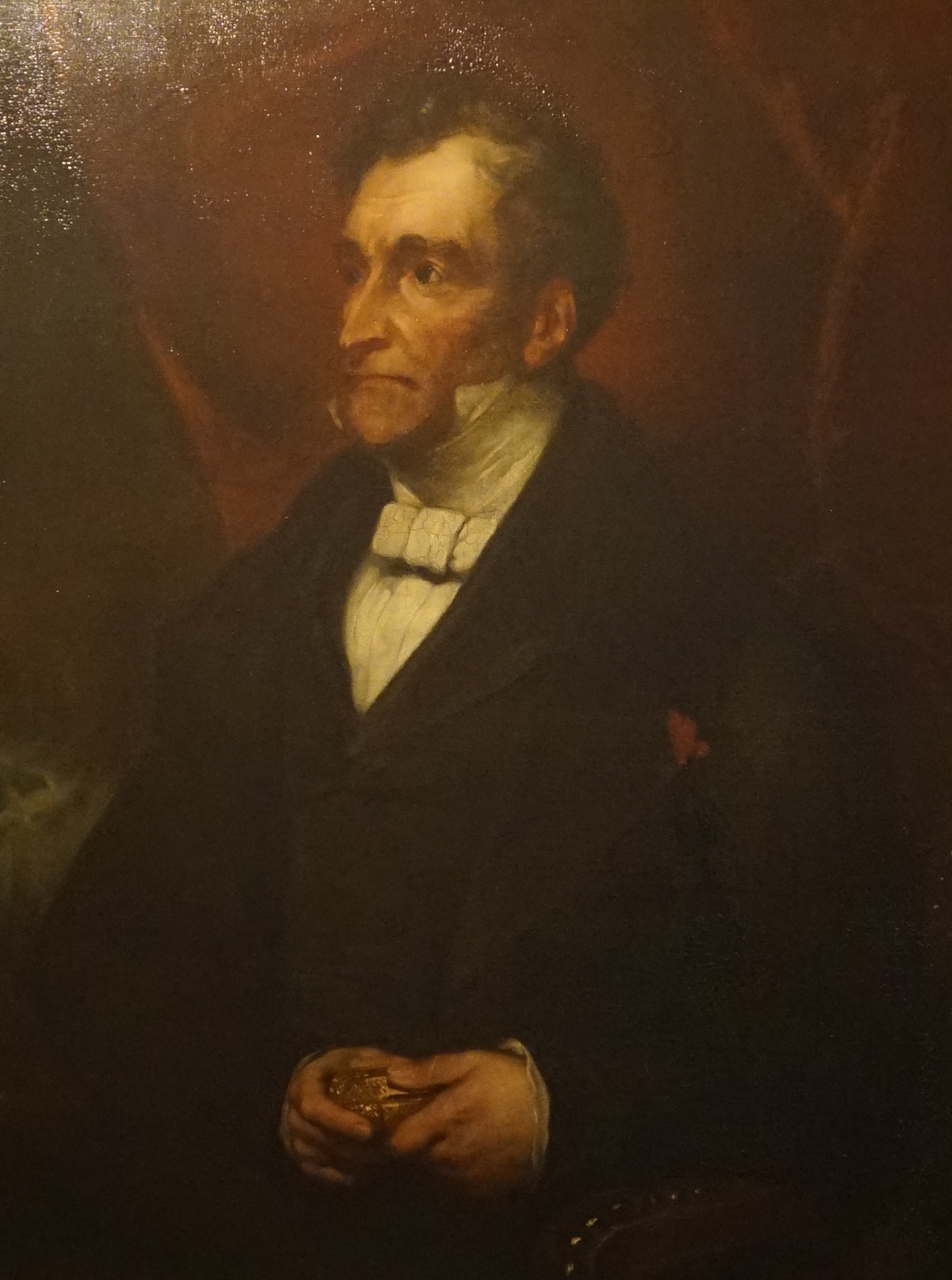

French Minister of Finance

Personal details
- Born: 13 November 1755
- Died: 26 August 1837 (aged 81)

Joseph Dominique, baron Louis (13 November 1755 – 26 August 1837) was a French statesman and financier, born at Toul (Meurthe).

At the outbreak of the French Revolution the abbé Louis (he had early taken orders) had already some reputation as a financial expert. He was in favor of the constitutional movement, and on the great festival of federation (14 July 1790) he assisted Talleyrand, then Bishop of Autun, to celebrate mass at the altar erected in the Champ de Mars.

In 1792, however, he emigrated to England where he spent his time studying English institutions and especially the financial system of William Pitt the Younger. Returning to France on the establishment of the Consulate he served successively in the ministry of war, the council of state, and in the finance department in Holland and in Paris.

Made a baron of the empire in 1809, he nevertheless supported the Bourbon restoration and was minister of finance in 1814–1815. Baron Louis was deputy from 1815 to 1824 and from 1827 to 1832. He resumed the portfolio of finance in 1815, which he held also in the Decazes ministry of 1818; he was the first minister of finance under the government of Louis-Philippe, and held the same portfolio in 1831–1832. In 1832 he was made a peer of France.
