= Henri Bertin =

French politician (1720–1792)

Henri Léonard Jean Baptiste Bertin
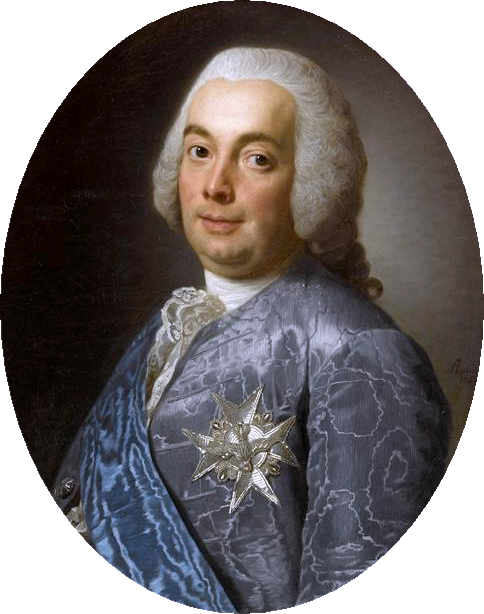
- Portrait by Alexander Roslin, 1768

Minister of Foreign Affairs
- In office 2 June 1774 – 21 July 1774
- Monarch: Louis XVI
- Preceded by: The Duke of Aiguillon
- Succeeded by: The Count of Vergennes

Personal details
- Born: 24 March 1720 Périgueux, France
- Died: 16 September 1792 (aged 72) Spa, Prince-Bishopric of Liège

Henri Léonard Jean Baptiste Bertin (born 24 March 1720, Périgueux; died 16 September 1792, Spa, Belgium) was a French statesman, and controller general of finances of Louis XV (1759–1763).

== Biography ==
In 1741, he was a lawyer in Bordeaux, and then advise the Grand Council president, comptroller of Roussillon (1749) and Lyon (1754) before being named lieutenant general of police of Paris (1757–1759).

He agreed in 1759 to become controller general of finance on the grounds that France was at war and finance was easier in times of war because all expedients are then allowed. But he warned Louis XV that he would resign once peace returned, which he did in 1763. He created the Land Registry to enable a better distribution of taxes. But his reforms were met with hostility from the parliament of Paris.

He then received, on 14 December 1763, a secretariat of State composed strangely detached from the overall control of Finance, whose duties included: the East India Company, manufactures of cotton and painted canvas, the stud and veterinary schools, agriculture and corporate agriculture, mining, inland waterways, canals, public carriages, cabs and couriers, taxi, small items, deposits and collections of charters, lotteries, the exchange of Principality of Dombes, and, like other secretaries of state, grants, pensions, patents and shipments depending on the department. This fairly extensive, included Guienne, Normandy, Champagne, the principality of Dombes, the Lyons, the Berry Islands France and Bourbon and all institutions of the East India Company.

Faced with the encroachment of the general control of finances, Bertin abandoned in 1764 the East India Company and the manufacture of painted cotton cloth, and in 1775 the coaches and express to Turgot. He however managed to keep the mines, through the abandonment of navigation to the superintendent of finance in charge of bridges and causeways. There was attributed to great difficulty in 1773 issues related to the clearing of communal property.

Bertin was one of the architects of the renovation of Agriculture, and the creator of the Veterinary School of Lyon. Fascinated by China, he allowed two young Chinese Catholics to spend several years of study in France, and then returning to China, and receiving a pension from King Louis XVI. Bertin supported the Jesuit mission to the Emperor of China (fathers Bourgeois and Amiot). Vergennes did not follow his recommendations, which is unfortunate, because China was the natural complement of trade with India, which the British understood very well in the crucial years between 1778 and 1785.

Bertin emigrated in 1791. He was an honorary member of the French Academy of Sciences (1761) and the Académie des Inscriptions et Belles-Lettres (1772).

Political offices
Preceded by Emmanuel Armand de Vignerot du Plessis de Richelieu, duc d'Aiguillon	Minister of Foreign Affairs; 2 June 1774 – 21 July 1774	Succeeded by Charles Gravier, comte de Vergennes
Preceded by Étienne de Silhouette	Controllers-General of Finances; 23 November 1759 – 14 December 1763	Succeeded by Clément Charles François de Laverdy
