= Clément Charles François de Laverdy =

French politician (1724–1793)

Clément Charles François de Laverdy (4 novembre 1724 – 24 November 1793) was a French statesman.

== Life ==
He was a member of the Parlement of Paris when the case against the Jesuits came before that body in August 1761. He demanded the suppression of the order and thus acquired popularity.

King Louis XV named him Controller-General of Finances in December 1763, but the tasks at hand seemed to surpass Laverdy's financial abilities. Three months after his nomination, he forbade the publishing of any material concerning his administration, thus refusing both advice and criticism. Two edicts in 1764 and '65 enacted the Laverdy Reforms, remaking civic government throughout France and—inter alia—reducing the power of the royal intendants. They were, however, specially excluded from application in Languedoc through a dispensation secured by the Parlement of Toulouse.

Laverdy used all means, sometimes illicit ones, to replenish the treasury, and was even accused of having himself profited from the commerce in wheat. A court intrigue led to his sudden dismissal on 1 October 1768. From that moment on, he lived in retirement until, during the French Revolution, he was involved in the charges against the financiers of the Ancien Régime. The Revolutionary Tribunal sentenced him to death, and he was guillotined in 1793.

== Notes ==
Political offices
Preceded by Henri Léonard Jean Baptiste Bertin	Controllers-General of Finances; 14 December 1763 – 20 September 1768	Succeeded by Étienne Maynon d'Invault
