= Michel Goudchaux =

French banker and politician (1797–1862)

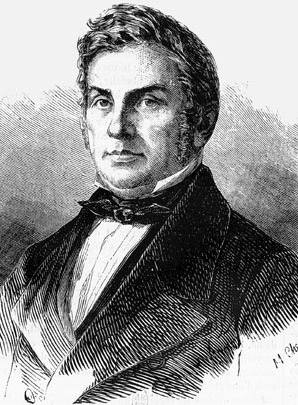
- Born: 18 March 1797; Nancy, Meurthe, France
- Died: 27 December 1862 (aged 65); Paris, France
- Occupations: Banker, politician

Michel Goudchaux (18 March 1797 – 27 December 1862) was a French banker and politician who was twice Minister of Finance during the French Second Republic. A firm Republican, he refused to accept the government of Napoleon III.

== Early years ==
Michel Goudchaux was born in Nancy, Meurthe, on 18 March 1797, son of Gerson-Jacob Goudchaux, a Jewish banker. At an early age he became interested in mathematics, and planned an academic career. However, when his father died, Michel and his two brothers continued the business, which was profitable although never large. In 1825 he moved to Paris to represent the bank, and there became involved in Liberal opposition circles. Early in 1830 he was one of the founders of Le National, a paper that attacked the regime of Charles X of France. He was injured on a barricade in the July Revolution of 1830.

After the revolution Goudchaux became a supporter of King Louis-Philippe. For a period he was general counsel of the Seine, and then paymaster-general of the Army in Strasbourg. In 1834 he left office after publicly criticizing the government's financial management in three brochures. Back in Paris he resumed his banking career, and invested most of his fortune in the railways. Writing in Le National he criticized the government's policy with the railways and with the Bank of France.

Goudchaux was the brother-in-law of Hypolite Worms, a large-scale coal merchant and founder of Worms & Cie, of the Jewish merchant family of Sarrelouis. He was in favor of free enterprise and competition. In 1847, as banker to an association of producer cooperatives, he made it clear that the members would be expected to compete with each other.

== First Ministry ==
Goudchaux was reputed for the strength of his Republican principles. Alexis de Tocqueville described him as both a banker and a radical. After the French Revolution of 1848, on 24 February Goudchaux was made Finance Minister in the cabinet of Dupont de l'Eure. There was some criticism of the appointment based on his religion. (Note: Even the left wing press was concerned that two Jews, Goudchaux and Adolphe Crémieux (Justice), had been appointed ministers. An article said, "A Jew has slipped into the heart of government ... Justice is the religion of France; we do not wish its altars profaned by Jews; it is necessary that they be chased from them.") However, he was known to be in favor of law and order and skilled in finance, so was expected to reassure business interests. He took emergency measures to resume the collection of taxes, which had been disrupted by the revolution, while promising to arrange for more equitable methods of taxation as soon as possible. He created a discount counter for small businesses and abolished the stamp tax on periodicals. He also authorized early payment of arrears by the government. This measure backfired, causing a crisis of confidence since creditors did not think the government could meet its commitments. Goudchaux resigned on 5 March 1848 and could not be persuaded to return. (Note: Another account says that Goudchaux resisted the abolition of the stamp tax on newspapers, and resigned when he was overridden.) He was succeeded by Louis-Antoine Garnier-Pagès.

== Second Ministry ==
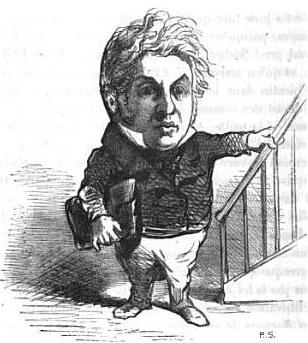
Caricature of Goudchaux by Cham, 1850

Goudchaux ran unsuccessfully as Republican candidate for the Assembly in April 1848. He ran again on 4 June 1848 in a by-election in the department of the Seine and was elected. On taking office on 13 June 1848 he was appointed to the Finance Committee of the Assembly. He made a major speech in which he proposed lower indirect taxes, free education to workers and limited subsidies to the National Workshops which had been created to provide temporary employment. The June Days Uprising from 24-26 June was crushed by General Louis-Eugène Cavaignac. Cavaignac formed a ministry on 28 June 1848 in which Goudchaux was made Minister of Finance.

Goudchaux immediately proposed to strictly limit the salaries of ministers. He proposed decrees on a loan for the Bank of France, repayment of savings bank deposits, treasury bills and other urgent matters. He supported tax exemptions and loans to assist businesses, but was against government bail-outs of struggling businesses. On 22 July 1848 Goudchaux presented a statement of the financial situation to the Assembly in which he said there would be a deficit of 209 million for that year. The budget could be balanced for 1849, but only by restoring taxes that had been abolished too quickly.

Goudchaux continued to propose measures to manage finances and participated in constitutional debates. Throughout his ministry he was hounded by the representative Creton to provide full details of all financial dealings of the provisional government, where Goudchaux had been Minister of Finance for a few days. When the assembly voted in favor on 24 October 1848, Goudchaux immediately resigned on the grounds that this implied he was not trusted. He was in poor health, as he would be for the remainder of his life.

== Later career ==
Goudchaux continued to support the government until it resigned on 10 December 1848 after the election of Louis Napoleon as President of the Republic. After that he opposed the Ministry of Odilon Barrot. In May 1849 Goudchaux was not reelected to the Assembly. He did not accept the coup on 2 December 1851 that would lead to establishment of the Second French Empire. In September 1852 he ran unsuccessfully for election as Republican candidate for the 4th district of the Seine. In June 1857 he was elected for the 6th district of the Seine, but refused to take the oath to the Emperor and could not take his seat. Michel Goudchaux died in the eighth arrondissement of Paris on 25 December 1862, aged 65.

== Sources ==
- Cahen, Isidore (1863). Archives israélites. Bureau des Archives Israelites.
- Camille, Michael (2008-11-15). The Gargoyles of Notre-Dame: Medievalism and the Monsters of Modernity. University of Chicago Press. ISBN 978-0-226-09246-1.
- "Goudchaux". IGPDE. Archived from the original on 2014-01-11.
- Journées illustrées de la révolution de 1848: récit histor. de tous les événements : accomplis depuis le 22 février jusqu'au 21. décembre 1848, jour de la prestation de serment du président de la république ... Bureaux de l'Ill. 1848.
- Pilbeam, Pamela M. (2000). French Socialists Before Marx: Workers, Women and the Social Question in France. McGill-Queen's University Press. ISBN 978-0-7735-2199-5.
- Smith, Michael Stephen (2006). The Emergence of Modern Business Enterprise in France, 1800-1930. Harvard University Press. ISBN 978-0-674-01939-3.
- The Annual Register, Or, A View of the History and Politics of the Year ... J.G. & F. Rivington. 1849.
- Tocqueville, Alexis de (1986). Selected Letters on Politics and Society. University of California Press. ISBN 978-0-520-05751-7.
