= Claude Guillaume Lambert =

18th-century French statesman

Councillor of state Claude Guillaume Lambert
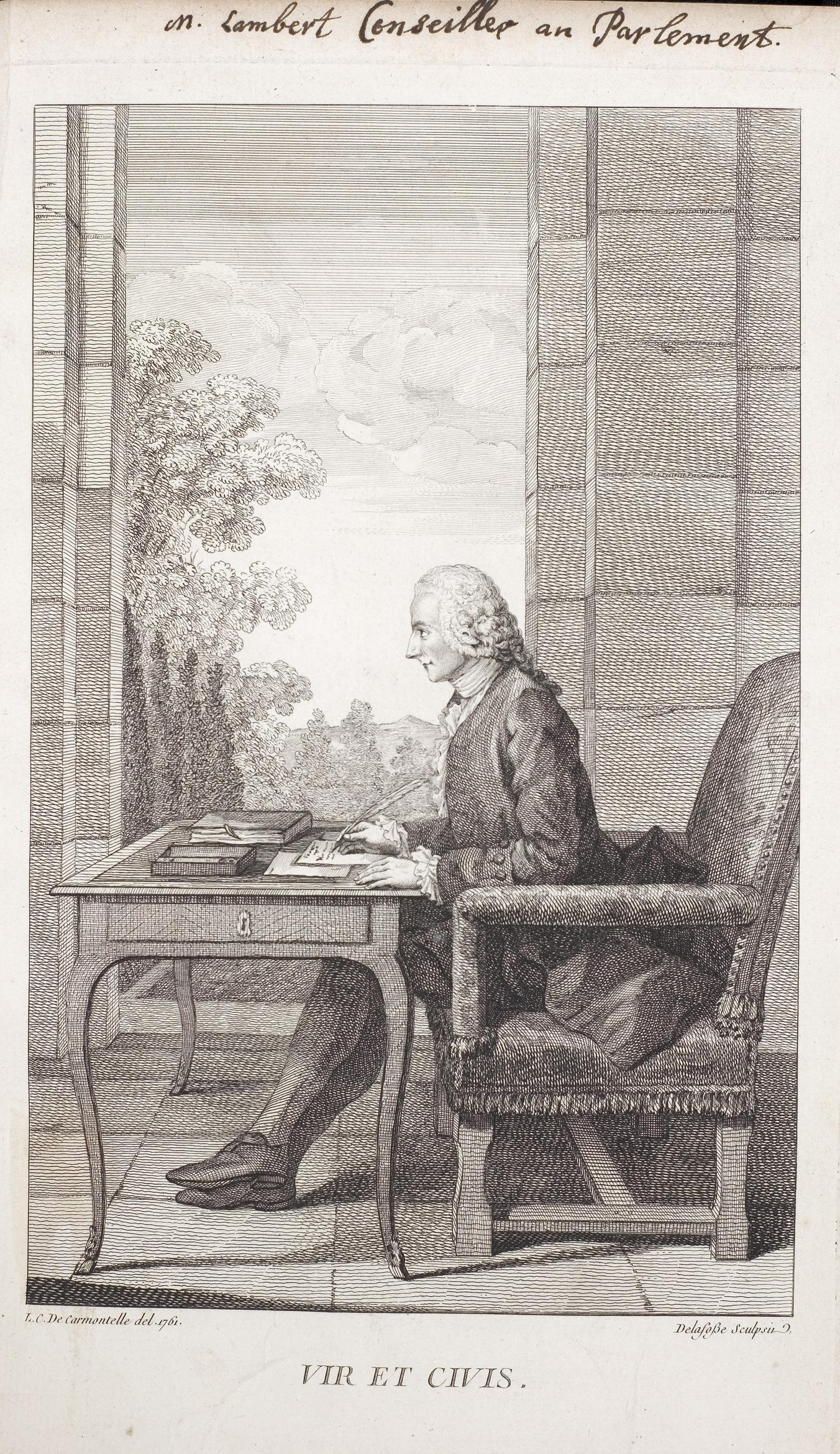
- Lambert c.1761

Controller-General of Finances
- In office 1790–1790
- Monarch: Louis XVI
- Preceded by: Joseph Foullon de Doué
- Succeeded by: Claude Antoine de Valdec de Lessart
- In office September 1787 – August 1788
- Monarch: Louis XVI
- Preceded by: Pierre-Charles Laurent de Villedeuil
- Succeeded by: Joseph Foullon de Doué

Personal details
- Born: 9 August 1726 Paris, France
- Died: 27 June 1794 (aged 67) Paris, France
- Cause of death: Execution by guillotine
- Occupation: Lawyer; politician

Claude Guillaume Lambert (9 August 1726 – 27 June 1794) was a French statesman and lawyer who served as Controller-General of Finances from 1787 to 1788 and again in 1790 under King Louis XVI. He was executed during the French revolution.

== Life ==
=== Birth and early life ===
Claude Guillaume Lambert was born on 9 August 1726.

=== Career ===
Lambert entered Parliament in 1748. He leant towards constitutionalism though never actively supported it. Ne served as Controller-General of Finances from 1787 to 1788 and again briefly in 1790 before his resignation due to the fiscal crisis. He was became a Master of Requests in 1767.

=== Trial and execution ===
Lambert settled in Lyon in August 1792. He was arrested under the Law of Suspects following his second trial. He was accused of authorising new taxes without the consent of the national and also of not paying his own taxes. He was subsequently executed by guillotine on 27 June 1794.
