= Jean-François de la Cour de Balleroy =

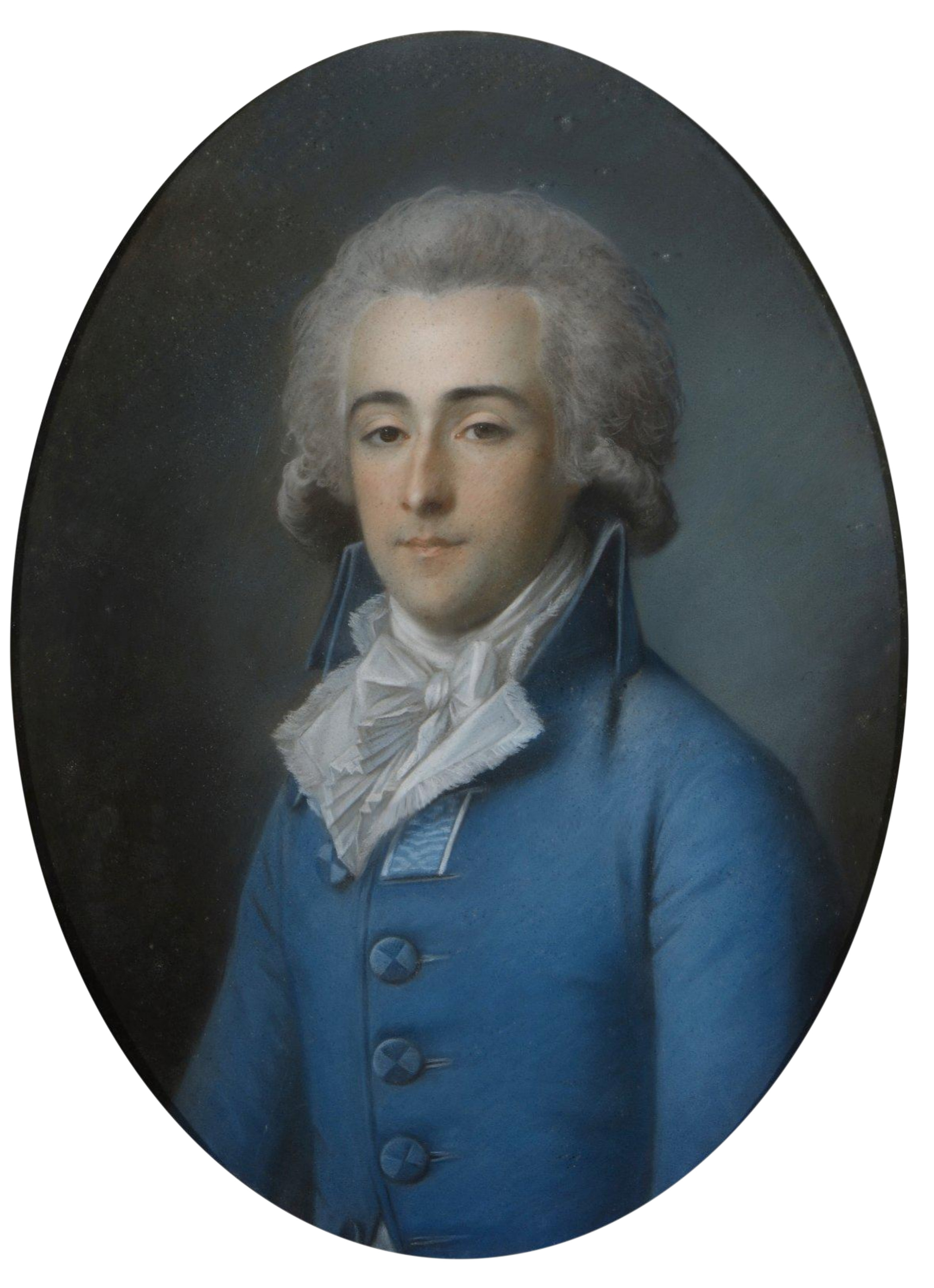
- Born: 22 November 1724 or 2 February 1726
- Died: 13 March 1802
- Service / branch: French Navy
- Rank: captain
- Battles / wars: War of American Independence; Battle of Martinique; Battle of the Saintes

Jean-François de la Cour de Balleroy was a French Navy officer. He notably served during the War of American Independence.

== Biography ==
Balleroy was born to a family from Normandie.

Balleroy joined the Navy as a Garde-Marine in 1742. He served on Content. He rose to Lieutenant in 1756.

In 1767, Balleroy captained the 24-gun fluyt Bricole, sailing between Brest and Rochefort. In 1768, he was at Almería.

He was promoted to Captain in 1772.

In 1775, Balleroy captained the 32-gun frigate Aigrette for missions in the Mediterranean.

In 1779, he was given command of Éveillé, part of the squadron under Orvilliers. He captained the 64-gun Indien at the Battle of Martinique on 17 April 1780, as well as in the actions of 15 May and 19 May 1780.

After the Battle of the Saintes, Balleroy was one of the members of the inquiry into the conduct of the French captains during the battle.

At the French Revolution, Balleroy was serving in Brest, from where he fled France to become an émigré.

== Sources and references ==
Notes

Citations

References

- Contenson, Ludovic (1934). La Société des Cincinnati de France et la guerre d'Amérique (1778-1783). Paris: éditions Auguste Picard. OCLC 7842336.
- Lacour-Gayet, Georges (1905). La marine militaire de la France sous le règne de Louis XVI. Paris: Honoré Champion. OCLC 763372623.
- Troude, Onésime-Joachim (1867). Batailles navales de la France (in French). Vol. 2. Challamel ainé. OCLC 836362484.
