= Emmanuel Armand de Vignerot du Plessis, Duke of Aiguillon =

French Royal Army officer and politician

The Duke of Aiguillon
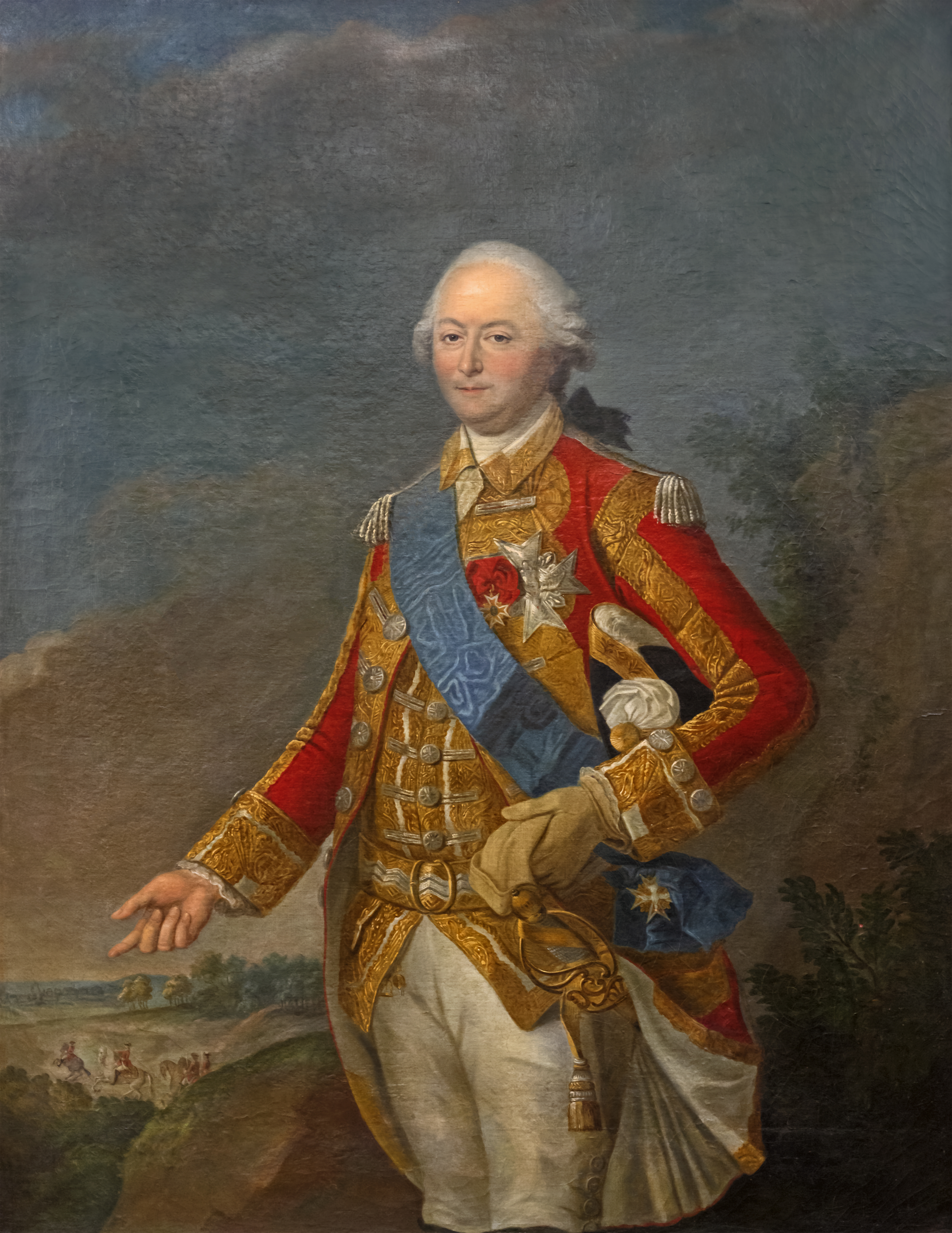
- Portrait of Aiguillon

Secretary of State for War
- In office 27 January 1774 – 2 June 1774
- Monarchs: Louis XV; Louis XVI
- Preceded by: The Marquis of Monteynard
- Succeeded by: The Count of Muy

Minister of Foreign Affairs
- In office 6 June 1771 – 2 June 1774
- Monarchs: Louis XV; Louis XVI
- Preceded by: The Duke of La Vrillère
- Succeeded by: Henri Léonard Jean Baptiste Bertin

Personal details
- Born: 31 July 1720 Paris, Kingdom of France
- Died: 1 September 1788 (aged 68) Paris, Kingdom of France

Military service
- Allegiance: France
- Branch/service: French Royal Army
- Battles/wars: War of the Austrian Succession; Seven Years' War: Battle of Saint Cast

Emmanuel Armand de Vignerot du Plessis de Richelieu, Duke of Aiguillon (French pronunciation: [emanɥɛl aʁmɑ̃ də viɲʁo dy plɛsi]; 31 July 1720 – 1 September 1788) was a French Royal Army officer and politician. A nephew of Armand de Vignerot du Plessis, until his father's death in 1750 he was known as the Duke of Agénois. He led a regiment in Italy during the War of the Austrian Succession and was seriously wounded at the siege of Château-Dauphin (1744). He was appointed commandant of Brittany in 1753 and defended it against British landing force at Saint-Cast (1758) in the Seven Years' War. He later served as the Secretary of State for Foreign Affairs and briefly as Secretary of State for War under King Louis XV.

== Early life and intrigue ==
He was the son of Armand-Louis de Vignerot du Plessis, Duke of Aiguillon (1683–1750) and Anne-Charlotte de Crussol de Florensac and so the grandson of Hortense Mancini, and until the death of his father, he was known at court as the Duke of Agénois. He entered the army at the age of seventeen, and at the age of nineteen was made colonel of the Régiment de Brie, a command he would hold until 1748. His marriage in 1740 with Louise-Félicité de Bréhan, daughter of the Comte de Plélo, coupled with his connection with the Richelieu family, gave him an important place at court.

Upon the death of King Louis XV's mistress, Madame de Vintimille, in childbirth in 1741, the king's best friend (and the duc d'Agénois' uncle), the manipulative Duke of Richelieu, began to cast about for another candidate to fulfil his royal friend's desires, as he did not want Madame de Vintimille's older sister, Madame de Mailly, to regain the king's affections. He eventually decided upon the younger sister of both Madame de Mailly and Madame de Vintimille, Marie Anne, the widow of the marquis de La Tournelle.

At a masked ball on Shrove Tuesday, 1742, Richelieu led Marie Anne up to the king and introduced them. The beautiful marquise, however, at first rejected the royal advances. She already had a lover, the young duc d'Agénois, and was not inclined to give him up even for the king's sake. As a result, the king conspired with Richelieu, who was the duc d'Agénois' uncle, to rid himself of the young suitor. Richelieu was quite anxious to do anything to bring about a liaison between the king and Madame de La Tournelle, because he knew that Madame de Mailly did not view him in a kindly light. The result of their deliberations was that the king, in imitation of the biblical David, sent his rival to fight the Austrians in Italy during the War of the Austrian Succession. The young duke was seriously wounded at the siege of Château-Dauphin (1744). Unlike the husband of Bathsheba, however, the duc d'Agénois recovered from his injuries and returned to the court in glory.

The king was in despair, but Richelieu, who was a resourceful man, was not one to accept defeat lightly. He sent his nephew to Languedoc, where a beautiful young lady had been instructed to seduce him. This she did most effectively; letters of a very passionate nature were exchanged; the lady despatched those which she received to Richelieu, and in due course they were brought to the notice of Madame de La Tournelle, who, furious at the young duke's deceitfulness, turned her attentions to the king.

The duke was later taken prisoner in 1746 and was made a maréchal de camp in 1748. He was a member of the so-called parti devot, the faction opposed to Madame de Pompadour, to the Jansenists and to the parlement, and his hostility to the new ideas drew upon him the anger of the pamphleteers.

Upon the death of his father in 1750, he became the duc d'Aiguillon. In 1753, he was appointed commandant (governor) of Brittany and soon became unpopular in that province, which had retained a large number of privileges called "liberties." He first came into collision with the provincial estates on the question of the royal imposts (1758). During the Seven Years' War, on 11 September 1758, he was responsible for repelling the British landing in Brittany at the Battle of Saint-Cast.

== Invasion of Britain ==
In 1759, the duc d'Aiguillon was hand-picked by the French foreign minister Choiseul to take part in a large-scale invasion of Great Britain. He was to command a force that would land in Scotland to support a Jacobite rising against the Crown. He would then lead his troops southwards, trapping the British defenders in a pincer between themselves and another French force that would land in southern England. The plan was eventually abandoned following the French naval defeat at Quiberon Bay.

The duc d'Aiguillon finally alienated the parlement of Brittany by violating the privileges of the province (1762). In June 1764, the king, at the instance of d'Aiguillon, quashed a decree of the parlement forbidding the levying of new taxes without the consent of the estates, and refused to receive the remonstrances of the parlement against the duke.

On 11 November 1765, La Chalotais, the procureur of the parlement, was arrested, but whether at the instigation of d'Aiguillon is not certain. The conflict between d'Aiguillon and the Bretons lasted two years. In the place of the parlement, which had resigned, d'Aiguillon organised a tribunal of more or less competent judges, who were ridiculed by the pamphleteers and termed the bailliage d'Aiguillon. In 1768, the duke was forced to suppress this tribunal, and returned to court, where he resumed his intrigue with the parti devot and finally obtained the dismissal of the minister Choiseul (24 December 1770).

== Foreign Secretary ==
When Louis XV, acting on the advice of Madame du Barry, reorganised the government with a view to suppressing the resistance of the parlements, d'Aiguillon was made Secretary of State for Foreign Affairs, with Maupeou and the Abbé Terray (1715–1778) also obtaining places in the ministry. The new ministry, albeit one of reform, was very unpopular and was styled the "triumvirate." All the failures of the government were attributed to the mistakes of the ministers. Thus, d'Aiguillon was blamed for having provoked the coup d'état of Gustavus III of Sweden, in 1772, although the instructions of the comte de Vergennes, the French ambassador in Sweden, had been written by the minister, the Duc de la Vrillère.

D'Aiguillon, however, could do nothing to rehabilitate French diplomacy; he acquiesced in the first division of Poland, renewed the Family Compact, and, although a supporter of the Jesuits, sanctioned the suppression of the society. After the death of Louis XV, he quarrelled with Maupeou and with the young queen, Marie Antoinette, who demanded his dismissal from the ministry (1774).

== Legacy ==
He died forgotten in 1788. The announcement of his death was worded as follows in Annonces Affiches Avis Bibliothèque nationale Arsenal 8 H 26195 n° 64 septembre-décembre 1788: 4 septembre 1788 (probably date of the burial, other sources mention a date of death of 1 September) Emmanuel-Armand Duplessis-Richelieu, duc d'Aiguillon, pair de France, noble génois, chevalier des ordres du roi, lieutenant général de ses armées, ancien lieutenant de la compagnie des chevau-légers de la garde ordinaire de Sa Majesté, gouverneur général de la haute et basse Alsace, gouverneur particulier des ville, citadelle, parc et château de La Fère, ancien lieutenant général de la province de Bretagne, ancien commandant pour Sa Majesté de ladite province, ancien ministre et secrétaire d'État des affaires étrangères et de la guerre. Décédé rue de l'Université, présenté à Saint-Sulpice et transporté à la Sorbonne.

He was the father of Armand-Désiré de Vignerot du Plessis-Richelieu, who succeeded him as Duke of Aiguillon.

== Notes ==
French nobility
Preceded by Armand-Louis	Duc d'Aiguillon; 1750–1788	Succeeded by Armand-Désiré
Political offices
Preceded by Louis François, marquis de Monteynard	Secretary of State for War; 27 January 1774 – 2 June 1774	Succeeded by Louis Nicolas Victor de Félix d'Ollières, comte du Muy
Preceded by Louis Phélypeaux, duc de La Vrillère	Minister of Foreign Affairs; 6 June 1771 – 2 June 1774	Succeeded by Henri Léonard Jean Baptiste Bertin
