= Louis-Antoine Garnier-Pagès =

French politician and active freemason

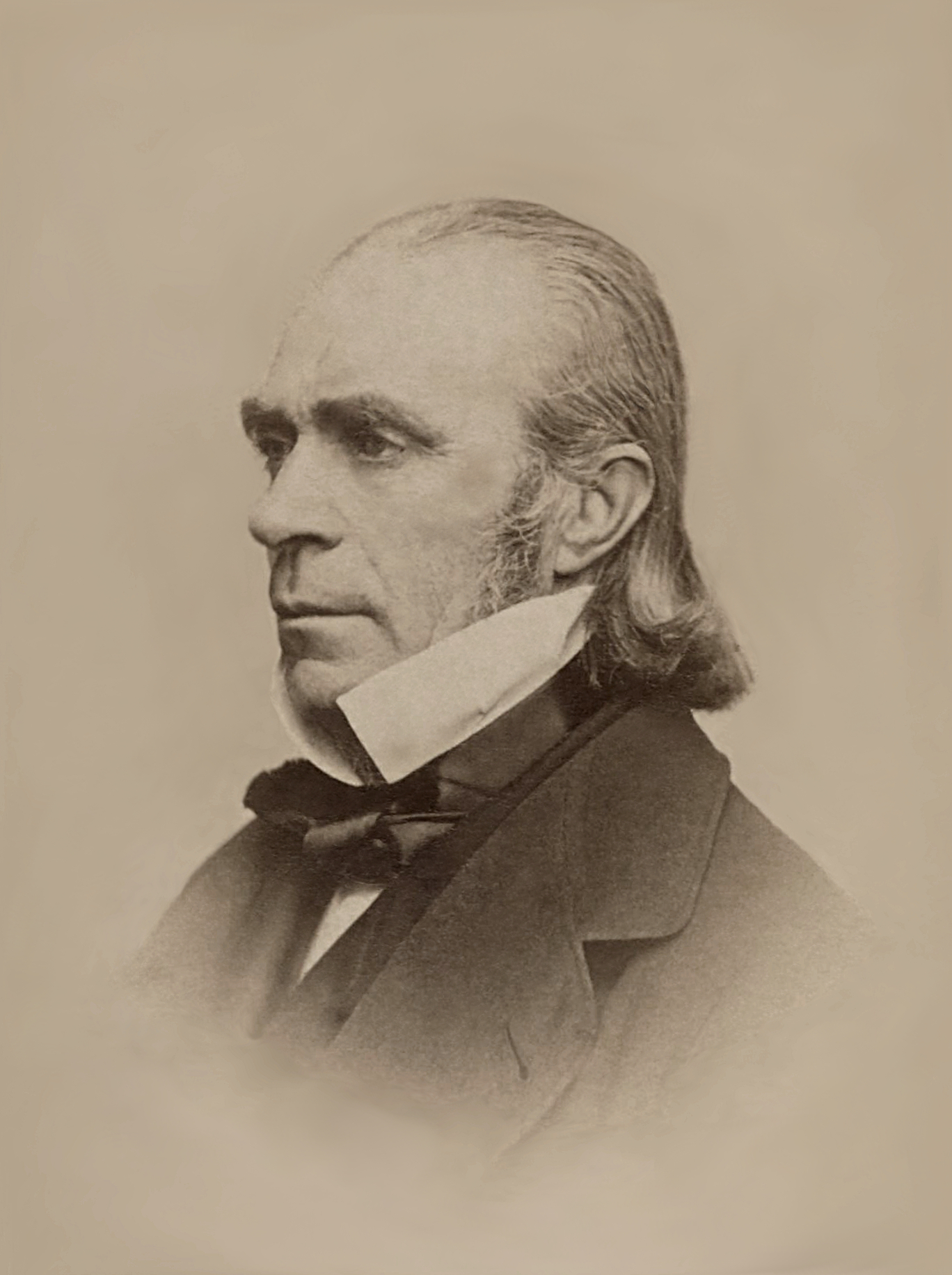

9th Mayor of Paris
- In office 24 February 1848 – 5 March 1848
- Preceded by: Office established (Jean-Baptiste Fleuriot-Lescot was mayor in 1794)
- Succeeded by: Armand Marrast

Minister of Finance Provisional Government of the French Republic
- In office 5 March 1848 – 11 May 1848
- President: Jacques-Charles Dupont de l'Eure
- Preceded by: Office established
- Succeeded by: Charles Duclerc

Minister without Portfolio Government of National Defense
- In office 1870–1871
- President: Louis Jules Trochu

Personal details
- Born: 16 February 1803 Marseille (Bouches-du-Rhône), France
- Died: 31 October 1878 (aged 75) Paris, France

Louis-Antoine Garnier-Pagès (16 February 1803 – 31 October 1878) was a French politician and active freemason who fought on the barricades during the revolution of July.

Garnier-Pagès was born in Marseille. He served as a member of the Provisional Government of 1848 under Jacques-Charles Dupont de l'Eure as well as Mayor of Paris from February to March 1848, and then a member of the Government of National Defense (1870-1871) under Louis Jules Trochu as a minister without portfolio.

He was a keen promoter of reform and was a leading spirit in the affair of the reform banquet fixed for 22 February 1848. He was a member of the provisional government of 1848, and was named mayor of Paris. On 5 March 1848, he was made minister of finance and incurred great unpopularity by the imposition of additional taxes. A surtax of 45 percent was implemented what came to be known as "the forty-five centimes". 1 member of the Constituent Assembly and of the Executive Commission, he was also instrumental in the creation of the nationwide network of comptoirs d'escompte.

Under the Empire he was conspicuous in the Republican opposition and opposed the war with Prussia, and after the fall of Napoleon III became a member of the Government of National Defence. Unsuccessful at the elections for the National Assembly (8 February 1871), he retired into private life. He wrote Histoire de la revolution de 1848 (1860–1862); Histoire de la commission executive (1869–1872); and L'Opposition et l'empire (1872). He died in Paris, aged 75.
