= Jean Lacave-Laplagne =

French magistrate and politician

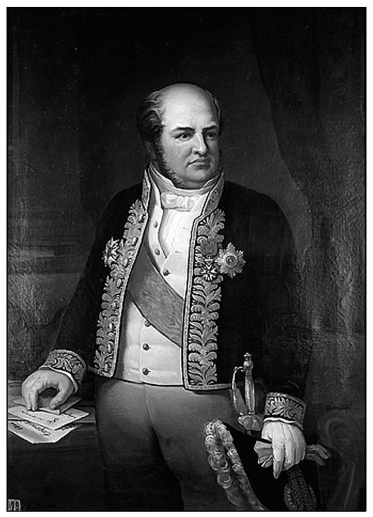
- Portrait by Gustave Lassalle-Bordes (1815–1886)
- Born: Jean Pierre Joseph Lacave-Laplagne; 12 August 1795; Montesquiou, Gers, France
- Died: 14 May 1849 (aged 53); Paris, France
- Occupations: Magistrate and politician
- Known for: Minister of Finance

Jean Lacave-Laplagne (French: [ʒɑ̃ lakav laplaɲ]; 12 August 1795 – 14 May 1849) was a French magistrate and politician.

== Early years ==
Jean Lacave-Laplagne was born in Montesquiou, Gers, on 12 August 1795. His parents were Barthélemy Lacave-Laplagne (1743–1814) and Jeanne-Marie Barris (c. 1755–1801), both from notable bourgeois families. He studied at the Ecole polytechnique, graduating in 1813 as an Artillery Lieutenant. He participated in Napoleon's Grande Armée in the last campaigns on the Empire. After the Bourbon Restoration he resigned from the army.

Lacave-Laplagne took up the study of law, and was admitted to the bar in Toulouse. In 1819, he entered the judiciary as a crown prosecutor. On 27 March 1819 he married his first cousin, Marie-Charlotte Tarrible (c. 1795–1871). They had four children. In 1821, he was made an auditor at the Court of Accounts.

== July Monarchy ==
Lacave-Laplagne supported the July Revolution of 1830 and the monarchy of Louis Philippe I. On 13 March 1831 at the recommendation of Baron Louis he was appointed Master Councillor. As the official candidate he ran successfully for election as deputy for the 5th college of Gers (Mirande) on 27 December 1834. He sat in the center, supported the government, and became noticed as a skilled speaker on a variety of topics.

On 15 April 1837 Lacave-Laplagne was asked to take the Finance portfolio in the second ministry of Louis-Mathieu Molé. He was reelected on 20 May 1837, and again on 4 November 1837 and 2 March 1939. As minister he had to defend all the draft financial laws of the government, including laws on pension conversion, slavery, forest clearance, railways, the budget and taxes. On 22 January 1839 the cabinet ministers resigned due to lack of support in the chamber. On 2 February 1839 the chamber of deputies was dissolved. Elections were held on 2 March 1839, but the new chamber would not support the government. The ministry was finally dismissed on 8 March 1839. Lacave-Laplagne returned to his seat in the Chamber with the conservative majority, and continued to participate in all discussions about public works and finance.

Lacave-Laplagne was again given the Finance portfolio when Georges Humann died on 25 April 1842, and retained it until 8 May 1847. He was involved in questions that included reducing the size of the army, police, patents, recruitment, conversion of pensions, postal reform, taxes on newspapers and periodicals, railway concessions, customs and salt taxes. Lacave-Laplagne was reelected on 9 July 1842 and 1 August 1846.

== Last years ==
After the February Revolution of 1848 Lacave-Laplagne returned to private life. He does not seem to have stood for election to the Constituent Assembly. When Louis-Antoine Garnier-Pagès, Finance Minister in the Provisional Government (24 February 1848 to 9 May 1848), criticized the financial administration of the July Monarchy, Lacave-Laplagne issued a rebuttal. On 13 May 1849 he was elected deputy for Gers in the Legislative Assembly. He died in Paris the next day, on 14 May 1849, from an attack of gout.

== Publication ==
- Observations sur l’administration des finances pendant le gouvernement de Juillet et sur ses résultats, en réponse aux rapports de M. le ministre des Finances [GARNIER-PAGES] des 9 mars et 8 mai 1848 (1848)
