= Joseph Marie Terray =

French politician (1715–1778)

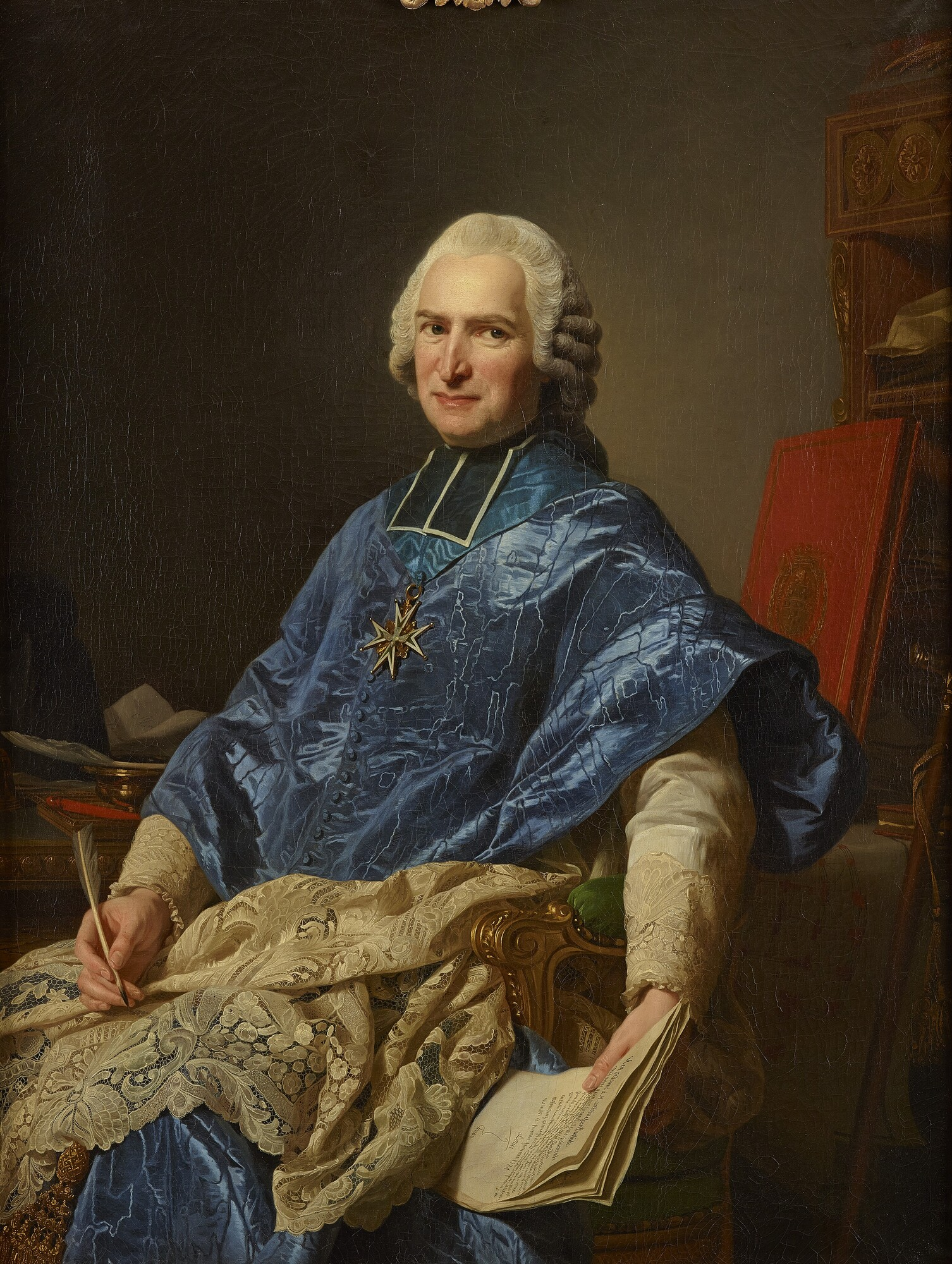
- Portrait of Joseph Marie Terray by Alexander Roslin, 1774; the red calf-bound portfolio symbolic of his appointment stands on the writing-table behind him

23rd Controller-General of Finances
- In office 22 December 1769 – 24 August 1774
- Nominated by: René Nicolas de Maupeou
- Monarch: Louis XV
- Preceded by: Étienne Maynon d'Invault
- Succeeded by: Anne Robert Jacques Turgot

Personal details
- Born: December 1715 Boën, France
- Died: 18 February 1778 (age 62) Paris, France

Abbot Joseph Marie Terray (1715 – 18 February 1778) was a Controller-General of Finances during the reign of Louis XV, an agent of fiscal reform.

== Biography ==
Terray, tonsured but not a priest, was appointed in 1736 an ecclesiastical counsellor in the Parlement of Paris, where he specialized in financial matters. In 1764 he was made abbot in commendam of the rich abbey of Molesme. The support of his uncle, physician in ordinary to the duchess of Orléans, mother of the Regent, eventually rendered him rich, enabling him to set aside his former circumspect style of life and openly seat his mistresses at his table. His genuine capacity attracted the attention of Louis XV's chancellor, René Nicolas de Maupeou, who made him controller general in December 1769. His first big venture was helping Mme du Barry's partisans to bring down the minister of foreign affairs, Étienne François, duc de Choiseul the very next year by demonstrating that the government could not afford to go to war with Great Britain. "Intelligent, plain-speaking, hard-working and rich", Terray spent the next few years stabilizing the finances of the country by repudiating part of the national debt, suspending payments on the interest on government bonds, and levying forced loans. These reforms aroused mass protest among nobles and commoners alike, which forced Maupeou to strip the Parlements of their political power in 1771, so that further reforms could be enacted.

Terray continued his overhaul of the financial system by reforming the collection of both the vingtième (a five percent tax on income) and the capitation (head tax) of Paris and renegotiating more advantageous agreements with the farmers general, the financiers who held the right to collect indirect taxes. These measures were responsible for a large increase in government revenue; however, he continued to face opposition, particularly over his restriction of free trade of grain, which opponents charged was part of a "Pact of Famine" with Louis XV designed to allow the king to profit from artificially high grain prices. When Louis XV died in May 1774, his successor Louis XVI bowed to pressure and dismissed both Terray and Maupeou.

== Patron of the arts ==
Terray's position enabled him to become a lavish patron of the arts. His rebuilding of his hôtel in rue Nôtre-Dame-des-Champs, c. 1769–74, was the last commission of Antoine-Mathieu Le Carpentier (1709–1773), who did not live to see its completion. The Hôtel Terray, "notable for the good arrangement of its rooms", later housed the Collège Stanislas and was demolished in 1849, when the rue Stanislas was extended through its garden, leaving an isolated pavilion. Pairs of paintings he commissioned from Nicolas Bernard Lépicié in 1775 (an The Interior of a Customs House and an Interior of a Market) and from Claude-Joseph Vernet in 1779, displayed a strong didactic bias reflecting Terray's concerns with the economics of commerce, rather than a choice by the artists From the history painter Nicolas-Guy Brenet he commissioned two subjects, equally referent to his official position; one, Cincinnatus Made Dictator was a clear reference to the enlightened despotism under which he operated; the other made a less open reference to his reputation as a speculator in grain: The Roman Farmer, in which Caius Furius Cressinus was wrongly accused of sorcery on account of the abundance of his crops: it had been exhibited at the Salon of 1775. Not all subjects of his commissions were so severe: from Jean-Jacques Caffiéri he commissioned a pair of table bronzes in 1777, on galante subjects: Cupid Vanquishing Pan (Wallace Collection, London) and Friendship Surprised by Love (Toledo Museum of Art). A small marble Bartholomew by Pierre Le Gros the Younger was purchased from the estate of the painter Jean-François de Troy, the head of the French Academy in Rome. Among the rich furnishings of the Hôtel Terray was a secretary desk by Bernard II van Risamburgh. His funeral monument was sculpted by Clodion.

After his death, the collection was dispersed by his nephew at auction in 1779.

Political offices
Preceded by Étienne Maynon d'Invault	Controllers-General of Finances; 22 December 1769 – 24 August 1774	Succeeded by Anne Robert Jacques Turgot
Preceded by César Gabriel de Choiseul	Secretaries of State for the Navy; 24 December 1770 – 9 April 1771	Succeeded by Pierre Étienne Bourgeois de Boynes
