= Duke of Aiguillon =

French aristocratic title

Coat of arms of the Vignerot du Plessis family, quartering the arms of Vignerot and of du Plessis de Richelieu

Duke of Aiguillon (French: duc d'Aiguillon) was a title of French nobility in the peerage of France, first created in 1599 by Henry IV of France for Henry of Lorraine, son of Charles, Duke of Mayenne. The title takes its name from the town of Aiguillon.

== List of dukes of Aiguillon, 1599—1789 ==
From	To	Duke of Aiguillon	Relationship to predecessor
1599	1621	Henry of Lorraine, Duke of Mayenne (1578-1621)	Son of Charles, Duke of Mayenne, whom he succeeded in 1611
1634	1635	Antoine de l'Age, duc de Puylaurens (1602–1635)	The Duchy of Aiguillon was granted to him under the title of Duke of Puylaurens
1638	1675	Marie Madeleine de Vignerot du Plessis (1604-1675)	Cardinal Richelieu purchased the Duchy of Aiguillon in 1638 and gave it to Marie Madeleine, the daughter of René de Vignerot and his wife Françoise du Plessis, the sister of Cardinal Richelieu
1675	1704	Thérèse de Vignerot du Plessis (d. 1704)	Niece of Marie Madeleine
1731	1750	Armand-Louis de Vignerot du Plessis (d. 1750)	Grandnephew of Thérèse
1750	1788	Emmanuel-Armand de Vignerot du Plessis-Richelieu (1720-1788)	Son of Armand-Louis
1788	1789	Armand-Désiré de Vignerot du Plessis-Richelieu (1761-1800)	Son of Emmanuel-Armand

The last Duke of Aiguillon supported the early stages of the French Revolution and became a general of the French Revolutionary Army, but had to flee at the time of the Reign of Terror.
