= Armand de Vignerot du Plessis, Duke of Aiguillon =

French politician (1761 – 1800)

Armand de Vignerot du Plessis
- Duke of Aiguillon
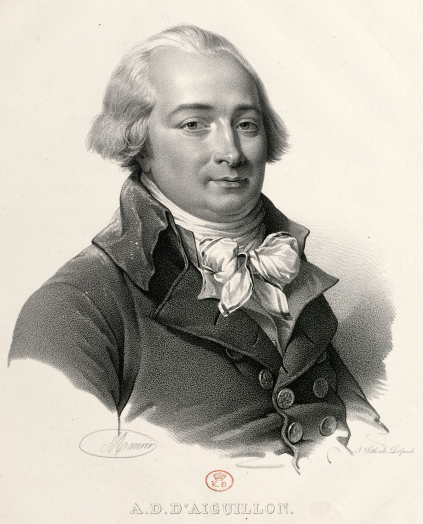
- Full name: Armand Désiré de Vignerot du Plessis
- Born: 31 October 1761; Paris, France
- Died: 4 May 1800 (aged 38); Hamburg, Germany
- Spouse: Jeanne Henriette de Navailles
- Father: Emmanuel Armand de Vignerot du Plessis
- Mother: Louise-Félicité de Bréhan

Armand de Vignerot du Plessis, Duke of Aiguillon (Armand Désiré; 31 October 1761 – 4 May 1800) was a French military officer and politician.

== Life and career ==
Aiguillon was the only son of Emmanuel-Armand de Vignerot du Plessis-Richelieu, Duke of Aiguillon, and his wife Louise-Félicité de Bréhan. In 1788, he succeeded his father as Duke of Aiguillon. In his Reminiscences, Michael Kelly recalled that before the French Revolution the duke was "one of the twelve peers of France, who... had an immense fortune, was a great patron of the arts, and so theatrical that he had a box in every theatre in Paris. He was particularly fond of music, and had been a pupil of Viotti". This was an Italian violinist who founded the Théâtre de Monsieur and had worked with Kelly when he was a stage manager.

In 1789, as a member of the National Assembly, Aiguillon became one of the first nobles to ally himself with the Third Estate and to renounce the privileges of the nobility. He became a general in the French Revolutionary Army, and was given command of the French army on the Rhine, but had to flee to Germany during the Reign of Terror of 1793–1794.

In 1796, Aiguillon was in London with the revolutionaries Charles Lameth and the orator Dupont. Michael Kelly introduced them to Richard Brinsley Sheridan and other friends, but the Duke of Queensberry refused to meet Aiguillon. On learning that Aiguillon's fortune was entirely lost or sequestered, Kelly arranged for him to make a little money by copying sheet-music, which he did secretly during the day, continuing to attend the theatre in the evening. Eventually, an order came from the Alien Office of the British Government that he and his friends must leave England in two days. The duke went to Hamburg, where he died. The duke left his favourite Danish dog in Kelly's care, shedding many tears on parting from it: the animal outlived its master, but pined and died soon afterwards.

== Notes ==
French nobility
Preceded by Emmanuel-Armand	Duke of Aiguillon; 1788–1800 renounced 1789	Extinct
