= Claude Louis, Comte de Saint-Germain =

French general (1707–1778)

The Count of Saint-Germain
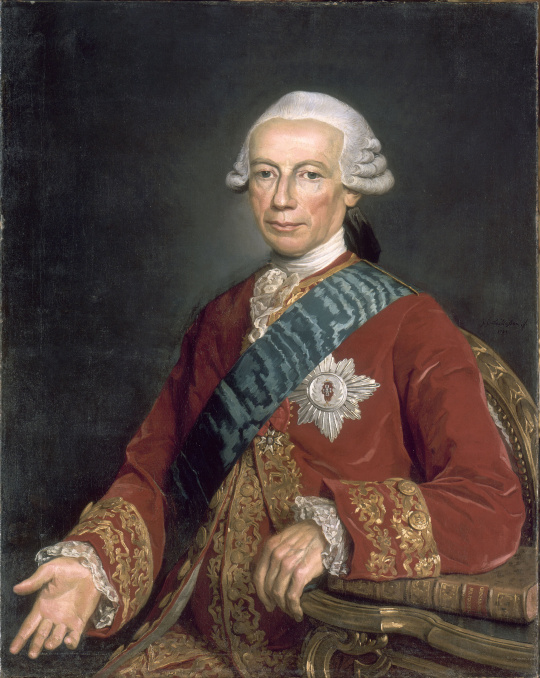
- Painting of Saint-Germain by Jean-Joseph Taillasson

Danish Secretary of War for the Army
- In office 28 October 1763 – 28 January 1766
- Monarch: Frederick V
- Preceded by: Conrad Ahlefeldt
- Succeeded by: Frederik Christian Rosenkrantz

French Secretary of State for War
- In office 25 October 1775 – 23 September 1777
- Monarch: Louis XVI
- Preceded by: Louis Nicolas Victor de Félix d'Ollières
- Succeeded by: Alexandre Marie Léonor de Saint-Mauris de Montbarrey

Personal details
- Born: Claude-Louis-Robert; 15 April 1707 Château Vertamboz
- Died: 15 January 1778 (aged 70) Arsenal of Paris
- Spouse: Ermgard Marguerite von der Osten (m. 1736)

Claude Louis, Comte de Saint-Germain (15 April 1707 – 15 January 1778), French general, was born on 15 April 1707, at the Château of Vertamboz.

== Biography ==
=== Early life and education ===
Educated at Jesuit schools, he intended to enter the priesthood, but at the last minute obtained from Louis XV an appointment as sub-lieutenant. He left France, according to the gossip of the time, because of a duel; served under the Elector Palatine; fought for Hungary against the Turks, and on the outbreak of the war of the Austrian Succession (1740) joined the army of the elector of Bavaria (who later became emperor under the name of Charles VII), displaying such bravery that he was promoted to the grade of lieutenant field-marshal.

=== Netherlands ===
He left Bavaria on the death of Charles VII, and after brief service under Frederick the Great joined Marshal Saxe in the Netherlands. He distinguished himself especially at Lauffeld, Rocoux and Maastricht. On the outbreak of the Seven Years' War (1756) he was appointed lieutenant-general, and although he showed greater ability than any of his fellow-commanders and was admired by his soldiers, he fell a victim to court intrigues, professional jealousy and hostile criticism.

=== Denmark ===
He resigned his commission in 1760 and accepted an appointment as field marshal from Frederick V of Denmark-Norway, being charged in 1762 with the reorganization of the Danish army.

In 1767, he and his circle, wished to make Birgitte Sofie Gabel the official mistress of Christian VII of Denmark-Norway in order to divert him from politics and take over the de facto power over the government themselves. The plan failed because Gabel did not wish to become the king's mistress, as she found him repulsive and was in love with Prince Charles of Hesse-Kassel, and the same year, Støvlet-Cathrine became the king's official mistress instead.

=== Late life in France ===
He soon returned to France, bought a small estate in Alsace near Lauterbach (close to Mulhouse), and devoted his time to religion and farming. A financial crisis swept away the funds that he had saved from his Danish service and rendered him dependent on the bounty of the French ministry of war. Saint-Germain was presented at court by the reformers Turgot and Malesherbes, and was appointed minister of war by Louis XVI on 25 October 1775. He sought to lessen the number of officers and to establish order and regularity in the service. His efforts to introduce Prussian discipline in the French army brought on such opposition that he resigned in September 1777. He accepted quarters from the king and a pension of 40,000 livres, and died in his apartment at the Arsenal of Paris on 15 January 1778.

Political offices
Preceded by Louis Nicolas Victor de Félix d'Ollières, comte du Muy	Secretary of State for War of France; 1775–1777	Succeeded by Alexandre Marie Léonor de Saint-Mauris de Montbarrey
