= Maréchaussée =

French army police force during the Ancien Regime

The Maréchaussée (French for 'Marshalcy') were corps of soldiers in the armies of France initially put in charge of military policing and justice during the Middle Ages, and later extended to civilian responsibilities. They gradually coalesced into a police force with jurisdiction over the whole population throughout almost the entire territory of France. They retained powers of extraordinary justice (known as prévôtale) until the French Revolution.

Reforms carried out in the 18th century created the first national police force. In 1791, the force was renamed the Gendarmerie nationale (National Gendarmerie). It is now one of the two national police forces of France, along with the National Police.

== Terminology ==
The term marshalcy is from the French maréchaussée, which is derived from Old French mareschaucie, meaning "the marshalcy." This derives from mairichauciée attested in 1287 meaning "royal household", and in 1465 as "the office of the marshal".

One account in the history of a small town in western France reports how the terminology was undergoing a change there at the beginning of the 17th century. At that time, one could refer indistinguishably either to the "archer (Note: An archer was a junior officer armed with a sword and a halberd (later with a firearm), responsible for maintaining order in towns and exercising justice.) of the provost" or "archer of the maréchaussée" for example, but by 1720 invariably the latter expression was used.

== History ==
=== Origins ===
With the Fall of the Western Roman Empire, officials in charge of police disappeared. With the rise of feudalism in France, policing powers formerly held by Roman officials were dispersed among a multitude of seigneurs. Lords of their fiefs, the seigneurs were all-powerful, including holding the power of justice over the peasants they controlled.

The origins of the Maréchaussée are difficult to determine exactly, but occurred sometime during the Hundred Years' War (1337–1453). Claims that the origins go back to 1190 under Philip II in the creation of companies of "sergents d'armes" during the Crusades are tenuous at best. Its development began in earnest in the 16th century, reaching its final form under key ordinances in the 1700s.

=== End of the Middle Ages ===
During the Middle Ages and to a lesser extent until the end of the ancien régime, the functions of the police and the justice system were closely intertwined. (Note: The notions of "police" and "justice" did not have the same meaning at that time as they do today. Policing functions were part of the justice system and were its executive body. See Brouillet (2013). Kings, lords and high dignitaries rendered justice.) Kings, lords, and high dignitaries rendered justice.

==== Constabulary ====
The Constable of France succeeded the Grand Seneschal in 1191 in the exercise of military powers and military justice on behalf of the king. The Constable gathered under him lieutenants bearing the title Marshal of France who led royal troops into battle and judged their actions. Each marshal had a provost (prévôt) who headed a small contingent of sergents (referred to as "archers" after 1501) to police the soldiers under the marshal's command and administer justice. The provosts would quickly take the name "provost of the marshals" to distinguish them from the royal provosts. Rulings were dispensed in separate courts. Judgements on the acts of soldiers such as desertion, treason and disputes with the general population were rendered along with punishments in the Court of the Marshals which existed by 1317. These special forces would eventually be known as the maréchaussée since they worked for the various army marshals.

These courts were itinerant, as they followed the army, lacked territorial jurisdiction and were composed of the marshal's particular provost and sergents. A second court that existed by 1321 was in the personal jurisdiction of the Constable and oversaw cases involving a point of honor (point d'honneur) or quarrels between soldiers regarding reputation, personal cases of the king's sergents d'armes and the conduct and service of the provosts of the marshals and their archers. The jurisdictions of the Constable and the marshals were itemized in the Ordinance of 1356.

==== Provostal tribunals ====
The tribunals were seated at the marble table (Note: marble table – under the Ancien Régime, the marble tables were superior jurisdictions in the Administration of Waterways and Forests. They take their name from the large marble table in the great hall of the Palais de Justice, Paris where the Constable of France, the Admiral of France and the Grand Master of Waterways and Forests exercised their office. The table was destroyed by fire in 1618.) in the Palais de Justice in Paris during the late 14th century under Charles V in part through his June 1373 edict. After the betrayal of Constable Louis, Count of Saint-Pol in 1475, then-king Louis XI removed the oft-vacant post of Constable from the head of the constabulary and moved the resolution of points of honor to the Court of Marshals. Sometime thereafter, the courts merged under the name of Constabulary and Marshalcy Tribunal, which name was retained even after the post of Constable was abolished in 1627. In this new court, the marshals rendered sentences alone.

By this period, the provosts were charged primarily with policing vagrants and administering justice in the provinces, with appeals falling to the Marshals and, ultimately, to the Constable. (Note: Quote: "From that same period going forward, the provosts or lieutenants of the Marshals, who were responsible chiefly for policing vagrants, administered justice in the provinces. Their decisions could be appealed to the Marshals, with the Constable serving as the court of last resort." "Dès cette même époque, chargés plus spécialement de la police des vagabonds, les prévôts ou lieutenants des Maréchaux rendent, en province, une justice dont il peut être fait appel auprès des Maréchaux, le Connétable étant invoqué en dernier ressort.") Their decisions could be appealed to the marshals and the Constable. In the 14th century, only one marshal and marshal's provost existed until around 1357, when war and unrest began to increase their numbers through the 15th century. Six provosts of marshals and up to 300 archers for the marshals and Constable would be recorded by the start of the reign of King Francis I in the early 16th century.

=== 16th century ===
A consequence of the Hundred Years' War was the formation of "free companies" (Grandes compagnies) from unemployed soldiers and mercenaries formerly hired by the king for the war which pillaged the countryside. France was finally liberated of these companies when future Constable of France Bertrand du Guesclin led them into Spain in 1366. With continued war between France and her neighbors, organized gang violence involving disbanded soldiers (écorcheurs) lingered and grew into the 16th century. In 1445, Charles VII recruited suitable members of these groups to help form the first paid standing army in Europe (the compagnies d'ordonnance) to prosecute war. However, after 1464 and into the early 1500s, the army as well as the marshals' provosts would be called on to also put down the remaining écorcheurs as the ordinary means of policing by bailiffs (bailli) and seneschals was ineffective. With a limited number of marshals' provosts, lieutenants had to be sent to temporarily represent the provost in the provinces to not only enforce military discipline but apprehend the itinerant looters and robbers and hand them over for judgement by the bailiffs and seneschals.

Whereas the maréchaussée had been historically mobile, the ongoing problems spurred Louis XII to create the first provincial constabularies on 20 January 1514, at the urging of the provinces. The temporary deputy positions changed to official titles, which depending on the size of the province they were attached to, were called "Provosts General" and "Provincial Provosts" or "Prévôts Particuliers." Their judicial powers remained limited to soldiery.

His successor, Francis I, went further, establishing such constabularies throughout France.

These special military forces roamed the countryside for up to two days at a time, catching and sentencing evildoers from among the military, and later, among the civilian population as well. They also had the power to sentence perpetrators they had caught, with no possibility of appeal.

The power of the provosts and their archers was limited to the military and the écorcheur bands, leaving out oppressive gangs of civilians who wandered the roads or encamped in the land. Francis I addressed the problem in a royal decision on 25 January 1536 (Edict of Paris) that extended the judicial authority of the maréchaussée to policing the countryside and main roads of the kingdom, taking on all highway crime regardless of whether the perpetrators were French soldiers or foreigners, military or civilian, vagabonds or residents. The variety of crimes falling under their jurisdiction increased over the succeeding fifty years. The expanded commissions were temporary at first until the 3 October 1544 edict put them into permanent competition with the local courts of the bailiffs and seneschals. However, the maréchaussées' ambit remained limited to the country outside the cities. The transformation of the role of the marshals' provosts to a provincial authority necessitated the appointment of new officers (prévôts des armées) to take over their former role of traveling with troops to repress military offenses.

=== 17th century ===
After the suppression of the Constabulary in 1626 by Louis XIII, the Constabulary and Marshalcy Tribunal was placed under the command of the Marshal of France.

According to the Criminal Ordinance of 1670 under Louis XIV, certain crimes identified as "royal cases" were investigated by the Maréchaussée but judged by a chamber of the Parliament dealing with criminal matters, while the others, identified as "provost cases" (cas prévôtaux), were judged in first and last instance by the provost courts. The act broadened the jurisdiction of the Maréchaussée to include burglary and popular disorder and confirmed their power to arrest any offender. It also sought to combat abuse of their authority by putting enforcement under the supervision of local royal courts. The powers of the Maréchaussée evolved to include policing of cabarets and road and waterway transport.

Louis XIV's administration profited from selling lieutenant-general posts to head up policing for Paris (created in 1667) and following a 1699 ordinance, for principal towns to oligarchies or feudal lords who sought the titles from vanity or an interest in the job.

=== 18th century ===
The Maréchaussée suffered from numerous problems—an uneven presence, lack of oversight, low number of personnel—aggravated by corruption (Note: Provosts and officers purchased their position. It was a mark of dignity, but also an investment which could be profitable. Moreover, the posts were hereditary.) of the officers and poor salaries. When Louis XIV died in 1714, it was estimated they had only 1,000 men to police all of rural France with companies of Maréchaussée based in larger towns with at times overlapping jurisdictions under the charge of commanders holding a variety of venal titles.

These and other problems led to a series of reforms (1720, 1731, 1768, 1769, 1778) beginning on 9 March 1720 propelled by the Secretary of State for War Claude Le Blanc to make it more effective, reinforce its military character, and improve coverage in the countryside. A decree issued the day after his first edict by the Regency that followed the death of Louis XIV further focused the Maréchaussée on the suppression of mendicity and vagabondage. Although the level of these problems had reduced at least in part due to the economic recovery after the end of the wars and the 1709-10 famine as well as existing Maréchaussée efforts, the Ordinance expressed concern about the great number remaining who "beg with insolence, more often through idleness than genuine necessity.

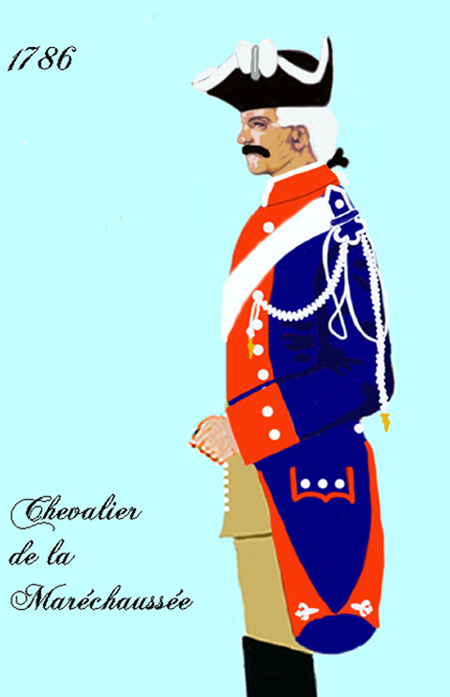
A chevalier of the Maréchaussée

Le Blanc appointed two paymasters in the Maréchaussée in February 1719 to buy back command positions that had been sold or inherited and abolished the old companies and titles in favor of a more structured and hierarchical system. The Maréchaussée was symbolically placed under the administrative authority of the marshals and the elite Gendarmerie de la Maison du Roi, a heavy cavalry corps integrated into the household of the king and later dissolved on 1 April 1788. However, it was in practice answerable to Le Blanc's office.

The edict of March 1720 profoundly reorganized the Maréchaussée and accentuated its territorial nature. It created a provost court and a company of marshalcy in each of the thirty-six governments or provinces (généralités). Maréchaussée companies were separate with one in Lorraine being independent until 1767 after the region's incorporation into France. Le Blanc placed a Provost at the head of each one, residing in the chief town of the province, who could be placed at the disposal of the Intendant. The provostships (prévôtés) were divided into lieutenancies, with a lieutenant in each city heading up a presidial court, which in turn were subdivided into squads (brigade (Note: Translation note on squad: French sources use the word brigade here to describe these small military teams, but since they consisted of only four to five men, using the English cognate would be very misleading here, since a brigade in English usage is a large military assemblage typically containing multiple battalions and thousands of troops. English terms like patrol or squad represent small teams, and the latter is closest in size.)) of four to five men distributed along the main roads. Each squad had to watch over about ten kilometers of road on either side of its headquarters. The "arrondissement" or "district" of a squad also included several dozen rural parishes in the area. In 1730, there were 30 companies in as many departments, with 3,288 men in 567 squads. The annual budget was 1,846,300 livres tournois. (Note: Livres tournois' (sometimes, LT) – The equivalent of 20 sous, from 1640 to 1795, or one tenth of a Louis d'Or.)

From 1760, the archers —junior officers under the provosts—became known as "cavaliers". The Royal Order of 25 February 1768 created 200 additional squads and reorganized their location, in order to achieve a more fine-grained and logical coverage of the territory. Nevertheless, in 1779 the Maréchaussée had no more than 3,300 men divided into 34 companies, one for each region (including Corsica), plus one for Paris and the Île-de-France, and another to ensure the king's security when he traveled, and 800 squads for the entire Kingdom.

After the reform of 1778, all thirty-three companies formed a single corps of six divisions with a total of 4,114 men on the eve of the Revolution, thus forming the first national police force in France.

=== Revolutionary period ===
During the revolutionary period, the Maréchaussée commanders generally placed themselves under the local constitutional authorities. Despite their connection with the king, they were therefore perceived as a force favoring the reforms of the French National Assembly.

As a result, the Maréchaussée Royale was not disbanded but simply renamed as the gendarmerie nationale. Its personnel remained unchanged, and the functions of the force remained much as before. However, from this point, the gendarmerie, to a greater degree than the preceding Maréchaussée, became a fully militarized force. During the revolutionary period, the main force responsible for policing was the National Guard. Although the Maréchaussée had been the main police force of the ancien regime, the gendarmerie was initially a full-time auxiliary to the National Guard militia.

In 1791 the newly named gendarmerie nationale was grouped into 28 divisions, each commanded by a colonel responsible for three départements. In turn, two companies of gendarmes under the command of captains were based in each department. This territorial basis of organization continued throughout the 19th and 20th centuries.

After the defeat of Napoleon, Dutch king William I, renamed the Dutch branch of the gendarmerie to Marechaussee, making the term continue in the Dutch armed forces.

== See also ==
- Criminal justice system of France
- Criminal law in France
- Judiciary of France
- Law enforcement in France

== Works cited ==
- Anorgend (20 January 2021). "1720 : création des brigades sédentaires de maréchaussées, lieux et effectifs" [1720 : creation of the sedentary brigades of maréchaussées, places and staff] (in French). Anorgend.
- de Bauclas, Gabriel Henri (1747). Dictionnaire Universel Historique, Chronologique, Geographique et de jurisprudence civile, criminelle et de police, des marêchaussées de France, contenant l'Histoire des Connêtables et Marêchaux de France, &c. 2 tom. [in 5 pt.] [Universal Historical, Chronological and Geographical Dictionary and of civil, criminal and police jurisprudence, of the marshals of France, containing the History of the Constables and Marshalcies of France, &c. 2 vols. [in 5 parts].]. Paris: G.F. Quillau. OCLC 1143038715.
- Bély, Lucien (2003). "Table de marbre, Tables de marbre". Dictionnaire de l'Ancien Régime : royaume de France, XVIe-XVIIIe siècle [Dictionary of the Ancien Régime: kingdom of France, 16th-18th centuries]. Quadrige (2nd ed.). Paris: Presses Universitaires de France. ISBN 978-2-13-054033-5. OCLC 53440583.
- Besson, Jean; Rosière, Pierre (2004). La Gendarmerie nationale: An 1000 à 1899 (in French). Vol. I. Paris: SPE-Barthélémy. ISBN 978-2-912838-28-5. OCLC 420203290.
- Bevans, Caleb Arundel (1941). The Old French Vocabulary of Champagne: A Descriptive Study Based on Localized and Dated Documents ... University of Chicago. OCLC 1048951173.
- Brouillet, Pascal (2003). Brouillet, Pascal (ed.). De la maréchaussée à la gendarmerie: histoire et patrimoine [From the maréchaussée à to the gendarmerie: history and heritage] (in French). Service historique de la gendarmerie nationale. ISBN 978-2-11-093655-4. OCLC 469653906.
- Brouillet, Pascal (2013). "Au commencement était la Maréchaussée". In Luc, Jean-Noël; Médard, Frédéric (eds.). Histoire et dictionnaire de la gendarmerie: de la Maréchaussée à nos jours (in French). Paris: Éditions Jacob-Duvernet. ISBN 978-2-84724-496-0. OCLC 869914346.
- Brouillet, Pascal (2016). "1. La maréchaussée et la gendarmerie à l'épreuve des siècles". In Luc, Jean-Noël (ed.). Histoire des gendarmes: De la maréchaussée à nos jours [History of the gendarmes: From the constabulary to the present day] (in French). Paris: Nouveau Monde. doi:10.14375/NP.9782369422372. ISBN 9782369422372.
- Brouillet, Pascal (23 March 2020). "Chronologie : La maréchaussée des origines à 1720" [The maréchaussée from its origins to 1720]. Musée de la Gendarmerie Nationale (in French). Maisons Alfort, France: SNHPG.
- Brouillet, Pascal (23 March 2020). "Des Prévôts des maréchaux à la Gendarmerie nationale" [From Marshals' Provosts to the National Gendarmerie]. Musée de la Gendarmerie Nationale (in French). Maisons Alfort, France: SNHPG.
- Carrot, Georges (1992). Histoire de la police française: tableaux, chronologie, iconographie [History of the French police: tables, chronology, iconography]. Approches #18 (in French). Paris: Tallandier. ISBN 978-2-235-01948-4. OCLC 1035815593.
- Cameron, Ian A. (1977). "The Police of Eighteenth-Century France". European Studies Review. 7 (1). London: Macmillan Journals: 47–75. doi:10.1177/026569147700700103. S2CID 145770365.
- "Centre National de Ressources Textuelles et Lexicales" [National Center of Textual and Lexical Resources]. CNRTL.fr (in French). 2012.
- Coulin, René (Colonel); École des officiers de la gendarmerie nationale (1954). Histoire et traditions de la gendarmerie nationale [History and traditions of the National Gendarmerie] (in French). Paris: s.n. OCLC 1136097468.
- "Des Prévôts des maréchaux à la Gendarmerie nationale" [The provosts of the marshals of the Gendarmerie nationale] (in French). Maisons-Alfort, France: La Société Nationale de l’Histoire et du Patrimoine de la Gendarmerie.
- Desaivre, Léo (1893). Histoire de Champdeniers (in French). L. Desaivre. pp. 220–. OCLC 237860020.
- Diderot, Denis; Le Rond d’Alembert, Jean, eds. (1765). "Prevôt". Encyclopédie, ou Dictionnaire raisonné des sciences, des arts et des métiers (in French). Vol. 13. Neufchastel.
- Dieu, François (2002). "Gendarmerie d'hier et d'aujourd'hui" [The police, yesterday and today]. La gendarmerie, secrets d'un corps (in French). Brussels: Editions Complexe. ISBN 2-87027-916-7.
- Emsley, Clive (14 October 1999). "2 'The Most Useful Corps for the Nation...': The Maréchaussée". Gendarmes and the State in Nineteenth-Century Europe. Oxford: Oxford University Press. doi:10.1093/acprof:oso/9780198207986.003.0002. ISBN 9780191677878. OCLC 5105521539.
- Ferry, Ferréol de (2016) [1958]. "Z/1c. Connétablie et Maréchaussée". Guide des recherches dans les fondsjudiciaires de l'Ancien Régime (PDF) (in French) (first electronic ed.). Pierrefitte-sur-Seine, France: Archives nationales (France).
- "Fonds des maréchaussées (1671-1790): Historique succinct de la maréchaussée" [Maréchaussées collections (1671-1790): Brief history of the maréchaussée]. Archives départementales de l'Hérault (in French). Montpellier, France: Département de l'Hérault.
- Sirpa Gendarmerie; Gendarmerie nationale (16 October 2016). "La gendarmerie, héritière des maréchaussées" [The Gendarmerie, successor of the maréchaussées]. French Ministry of Interior (in French).
- Larané, André (10 June 2020). "26 mai 1445: Charles VII crée les Compagnies d'ordonnance" [26 May 1445: Charles VII creates the compagnies d'ordonnance]. Herodote.net (in French). Paris, France: Herodote.net SAS.
- Larrieu, Louis; Service historique de la gendarmerie nationale (2002). Histoire de la maréchaussée et de la gendarmerie: des origines à la quatrième république [History of the Marshalsea and the Gendarmerie: from the origins to the fourth republic] (in French). Ivry-sur-Seine: Phénix éd. ISBN 978-2-7458-0796-0. OCLC 469644979.
- Loi du 16 Février 1791 [Law of 16 February 1791] (Loi) (in French). 1791.
- Lorgnier, Jacques (1994). Maréchaussée, histoire d'une révolution judiciaire et administrative: Les juges bottés (in French). Vol. I. Paris: Harmattan. ISBN 2-7384-3061-9.
- Luc, Jean-Noël (2002). Centre de recherches sur l'histoire du XIXe siècle (ed.). Gendarmerie, état et société au XIXe siècle (in French). Paris: Publications de la Sorbonne. ISBN 978-2-85944-449-5. OCLC 50339063.
- Martin, Daniel (1980). "La maréchaussée au XVIIIe siècle. Les hommes et l'institution en Auvergne" [The Marechausse in the 18th century. Men and the institution in Auvergne]. Annales historiques de la Révolution française (in French). 239 (239). Paris: Society for Robespierrist Studies: 91–117. doi:10.3406/ahrf.1980.4195.
- Paresys, Isabelle; Conchon, Anne; Maës, Bruno (2004). Dictionnaire de l'Ancien Régime [Dictionary of the Ancien Régime] (in French). Paris: Armand Colin. ISBN 978-2200-28026-0. OCLC 1236250318.
- Ministère de l'Intérieur (10 October 2011). "Histoire de la police judiciaire | Direction Centrale de la Police Judiciaire | Organisation - Police nationale" [History of the judicial police | Central Directorate of the Judicial Police | Organization - National Police] (in French).
- Secousse, Denis-François (1736). "Reglement pour la Mareschaussee." [Regulations for the Mareschaussee]. Ordonnances des roys de France de la troisième race, receuillies par order chronologique [Ordinances of the kings of France of the third race, listed in chronological order] (in French). Vol. 5. Paris: L'Imprimerie Royale.
- Walsh, William Francis (2021). "The decline of constabulary police". Encyclopedia Britannica. "The military police roamed the countryside—they were not allowed to stay in one place for more than two days in a row—to catch military and, eventually, civilian offenders and to use their sentencing power to inflict punishment, for which there was no appeal. These special forces were not at first united in a single organization, but they came to be known collectively as the maréchaussée, as they were assigned to the various army marshals."
