= Hôtel de la Guerre =

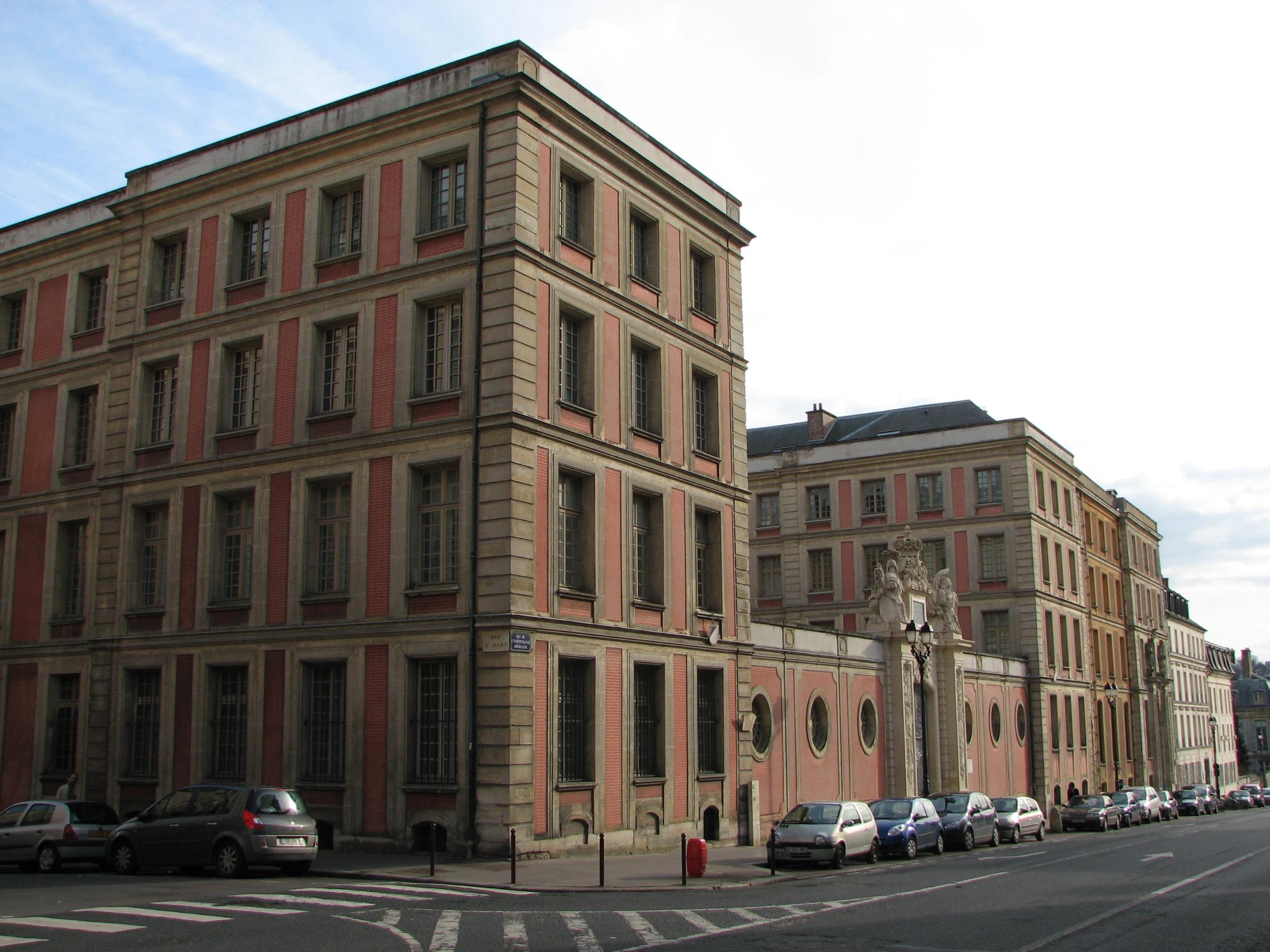
- Façade and entrance gate as seen in 2011. Just passed the building (in the darker colour) is the Hôtel des Affaires Étrangères et de la Marine also built by Berthier to host the archives of the French Royal Navy
- Alternative names: Carnot Barracks

General information
- Status: in use
- Architectural style: Neoclassical
- Location: Versailles, France, 3, Rue de l'Indépendance-Américane, France
- Coordinates: 48°48′9″N 2°7′17″E
- Construction started: 1759
- Completed: 1760
- Owner: Ministry of Defence

Design and construction
- Architect: Jean-Baptiste Berthier

The Hôtel de la Guerre (literally the 'Hotel of the War'), also known as Carnot Barracks, is a building located at 3, Rue de l'Indépendance-Américaine in Versailles, built near the Palace of Versailles. The building was built in 1760 by Jean-Baptiste Berthier, father to the later famed Marshal Louis-Alexandre Berthier, to bring together the different war offices into one central location (until then, they had been dispersed in Paris, notably at the Bastille and Hôtel de Ville). The building was one of the first buildings built in France which was designed to be 'fire proof' and 'limited the risks of a fire'. The building currently houses the Central Directorate of the Defence Infrastructure Service, part of the French Army.

The building's massive entrance was classified as a historical monument on 1 September 1922, followed by the façade on the street side and roof, classified on 16 September 1929.

== History ==
During the height of the Seven Years' War, the Department of War was massively expanded and in need of a building were the staff could congregate together. The head of the Topographic Engineers, Jean-Baptiste Berthier, sent by the Secretary of State for War Charles Louis Auguste Fouquet, Duc de Belle-Isle, to ask Louis XV approve the construction of a building near the Palace of Versailles, which would be able to "bring together the scattered nine elements of the Army in one place so that the ministers do not need to continue their incessant round trips and wasted time between Paris and Versailles". Berthier met with the King and told him that he would be able to build a building large enough to house all these services and their archives for less than 150,000 livres. Berthier put forward that in addition to supporting the economy, the building would prevent the risk of fire by using the so-called flat vault construction (also called Saracen or Roussillon vaults). These vaults were already used in the south of France but they were introduced for the first time in the north of the country for the construction of the stables of the Château de Bizy in Normandy, owned by the Duc de Belle-Isle. This technique was however known, having even already been the subject of few publications.

It is believed that the massive fire at the Great Stables of Versailles on 13 September 1751 was caused during the fireworks display to celebrate the birth of Louis, Duke of Burgundy. As a result of the fire, Berthier used this example of the fire to work on the building in the new style, which was late expanded to all buildings relating to the armed forces.

The King granted him land, originally intended to serve as common for the Dauphine and located at the corner of the streets of the Surintendance (current street of Independence-Américaine) and Saint-Julien. Former royal vegetable garden under Louis XIII and at the beginning of the reign of Louis XIV, this land was then abandoned in favour of a new vegetable garden and left fallow in the middle of the extension of the castle's service buildings.

Begun in July 1759, construction was completed a year and a half later. Wood with the exception of a few panelled walls was excluded. The vaults of the ceilings were made of bricks bound by plaster, the floor was made of terracotta tiles, all resting on thick walls with a brick core.

In 1761, the Duke of Choiseul, who had become Secretary of State for War on the death of Marshal de Belle-Isle, had the Hotel for Foreign Affairs and the Archives of the Navy (Hôtel des Affaires Étrangères et de la Marine) built next to it, built using the same technique.

On 26 June 1762, King Louis XV, accompanied by the Dauphin came to visit the building. Berthier to demonstrate its safety made an experiment by setting fire to a pile of wood and straw placed in one of the rooms. This did not spread to neighbouring rooms.

During the Revolution, the Ministry of War moved to Paris and the building was temporarily occupied by the services of the new department of Seine-et-Oise which later did serious damage there. In 1798, it served as an extension to the arms factory installed in the neighbouring Grand Commune . The army would then take possession of it with the installation of nearly 500 infantry troops, then in 1884, the installation of a new School of Artillery, Engineering and Train, which in 1912, will become the Military Engineering Application School. During the Nazi occupation of France a police academy was set up there and, shortly after the war, a preparation centre for the grandes écoles. In 1946, the higher technical school of engineering moved there, the previous engineering school having left for Angers. In 1995, the two schools merged into a higher engineering and application school located in Angers. The building is now occupied by the central directorate of the Defence Infrastructure Service (former Central Engineering Directorate).

== Original items ==
There is not much left of the original décor of the Hôtel de la Guerre today, with the exception of Diane's salon. On the vault, paintings on stucco illustrate the reversal of the alliances of 1756 . On the walls are hung a painting representing King Louis XV on horseback giving his orders during the Flanders War in 1745, a work by Charles Cozette and 6 canvases by Pierre Lenfant, painted between 1757 and 1771. Commissioned by Louis XV, they represent the War of the Austrian Succession .

The exterior gate still exists. It is surmounted by a royal crown on a sun, framed by war trophies. Reliefs carved on the pilasters represent cornucopias from which officers' patents and Saint-Louis crosses emerge . We also see plans of fortresses and weapons.
