= Cabinet wars =

Limited wars among European monarchies, 1648 to 1789

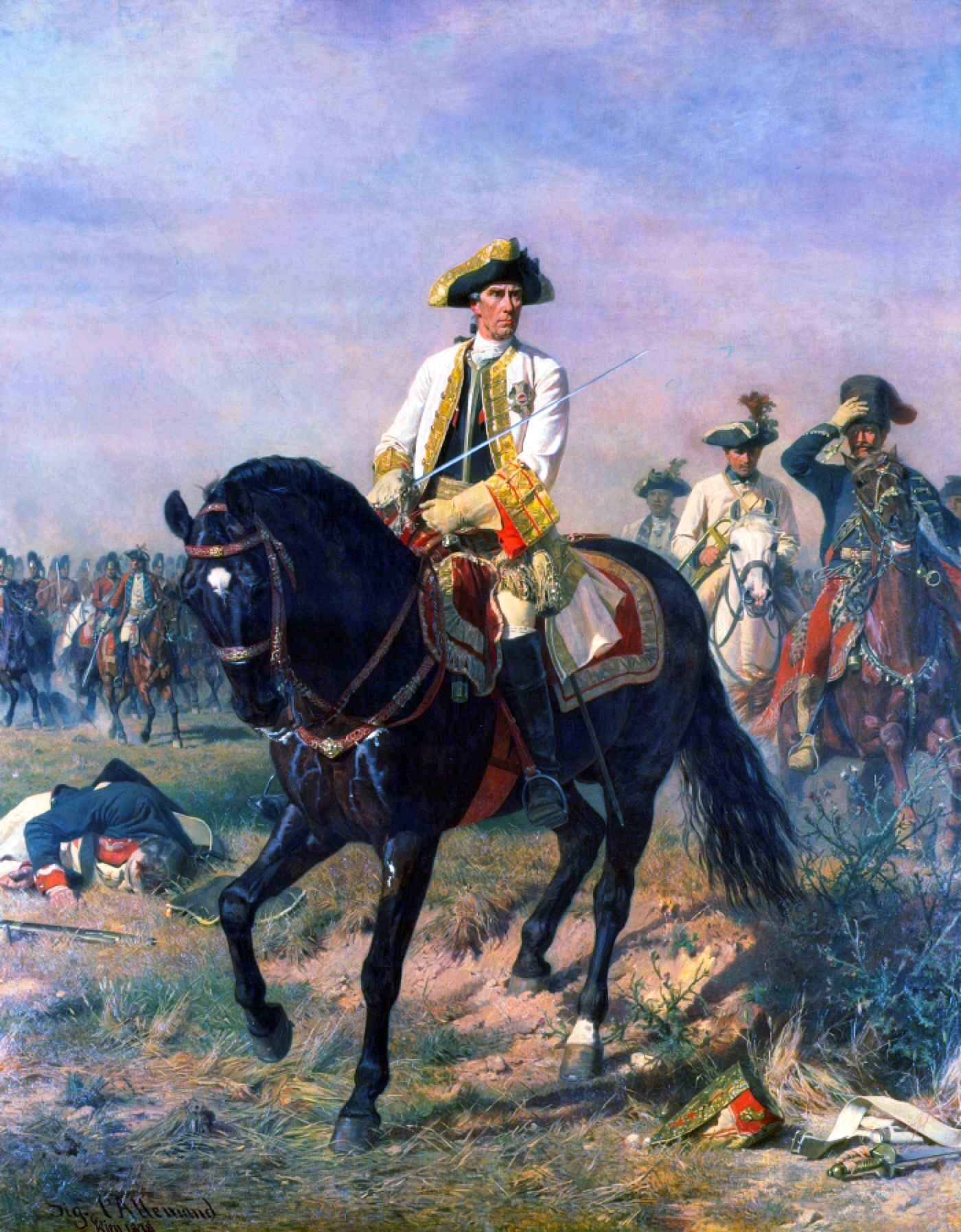
The Battle of Kunersdorf was part of the Seven Years' War, one of the most notable cabinet wars.

Cabinet wars, derived from the German expression Kabinettskriege (German: [kabiˈnɛtsˌkʁiːɡə], singular Kabinettskrieg), is a historical term used to describe the regular, limited, aristocratic conflicts of eighteenth-century Europe, before the shift to total war that followed the French Revolution. Historians define cabinet wars as a period of small conflicts not involving standing armies, but with a growing military class arising to advise monarchs. The term derived from the counsel these cabinets provided during the period of absolute monarchies from the 1648 Peace of Westphalia to the 1789 French Revolution. These cabinets were marked by diplomacy and a self-serving nobility.

== History ==
Cabinet wars marked the period of limited conflicts between monarchs from 1648 to 1789. These conflicts define a transition from princely wars (Fürstenkriege) to state wars (Staatenkriege) and Volkskriege, or wars of the people or nation in the mid-nineteenth century such as the French Revolution. Cabinet wars were often more regulated, fought over lesser stakes, and revolved around noble territorial disputes and emerging state borders. Power was centralized in the capitals, where the highest institutions—for example, the Hofkriegsrat in the Habsburg monarchy, and the Department of War in the Kingdom of France—directed military operations in every detail; hence the term "cabinet warfare." Only such outstanding figures as Eugene of Savoy and Raimondo Montecuccoli dared to occasionally deviate from the instructions of the Hofkriegsrat. None of this existed in Russia, where Emperor Peter I himself, for example, was commander-in-chief.

Cabinet wars, as historically defined, link the evolution of the state with evolution of modern warfare. These conflicts were marked by mercenary forces from different countries who did not identify with an abstract notion of the nation, rather than national standing militaries.

The contrast between Kabinettskriege, cabinet wars, and Staatenkriege, or state wars, was popularized by Helmuth von Moltke the Elder who oversaw the modernization of the Prussian and Ottoman militaries. This classifications of three types of modern war: cabinet war, people's war and guerrilla war built off of Carl von Clausewitz' two types of war.

This classification of cabinet wars stems from the analysis of warfare after the Napoleonic Wars by Clausewitz and other military writers of the time. Debate centered around the question of whether wars should be all encompassing, or more limited in nature. In On War (1832) Clausewitz suggested a third type of war of limited strategy. Over time the classification became adopted in the lexicon of military historians.

Historians generally mark the end of the cabinet wars period with the beginning of the use of conscription and the levée en masse.

== Characteristic ==
Cabinet wars were not just bracketed by the Thirty Years' War and the French Revolution; they were marked by specific characteristics. Historians note the following features:

- Limited in scope – The goals of the war often revolved around maintaining a balance of power or small territorial gains amongst noble families.
- Limited military – Engagements were often with smaller professional armies and the battles fought by commanders limited in decisive commitment of arms. The cabinet wars marked the transition of mercenaries to professional soldiers.
- Limited religious goals – The wars before the Thirty Years' War often turned on religious conflict. Until the rise of nationalism, cabinet war battles did not rely on religion, idolatry, or symbolism.
- Limited outcomes – Cabinet wars did not reshuffle the balance of power in Europe nor replace heads of states.
