= Claude Bazin de Bezons =

French lawyer and politician (1617–1684)

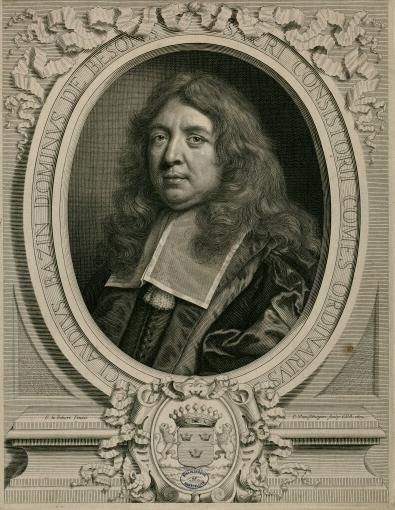
Portrait of Claude Bazin de Bezons

Claude Bazin de Bezons (French pronunciation: [klod bazɛ̃ də bəzɔ̃]; 1617 – 20 March 1684) was a French lawyer, politician, and second holder of l'Académie française, seat 1.

== Biography ==
Bazin de Bezons was born in Paris, France. His grandfather, Claude Bazin, married Marie Chanterel in 1571 and was knighted by Louis XIII in 1611, giving him the Lordship of Bezons.

Claude Bazin de Bezons eventually became an attorney at the Grand Conseil, a high French court put in place to rule on contentious legal matters. In 1643, he was elected member of the Académie française, and eventually became its oldest member.

He served as the intendant (royal administrative head) of justice, police, and finance in Soissons, and then Languedoc from 1654 to 1674, during which he was also commissioned to direct the reorganization of the universities of Toulouse and Montpellier. After returning to Paris, he was named to the Conseil d'État (Council of State).

He only left a few brief written works, including some speeches and rants, as well as a translation of the Peace of Prague between Ferdinand II and the Prince-Elector of Saxony in 1635.

== Children ==
Claude Bazin de Bezons was the father of:

- Louis Bazin de Bezons (died 1700), Magistrate
- Jacques (1646–1733), Marshal of France
- Suzanne (1648–1699) married Louis Le Blanc, mother of Secretary of State for War Claude Le Blanc
- Armand Bazin de Bezons (1654–1721), Archbishop of Rouen and Archbishop of Bordeaux,
