= Jacques Bazin de Bezons =

French Field Marshal

- Marquis of Bezons
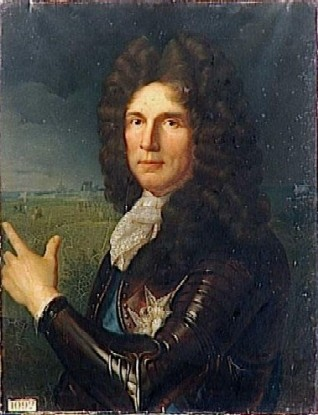
- Born: 14 November 1646; Paris, France
- Died: 22 May 1733 (aged 86); Paris, France
- Father: Claude Bazin de Bezons
- Military career
- Allegiance: Kingdom of France
- Rank: Marshal of France
- Wars: Cretan War; Siege of Candia; Franco-Dutch War; Battle of Seneffe; Nine Years' War; Battle of Steenkerque; Battle of Landen; War of the Spanish Succession; Battle of Chiari; Battle of Luzzara; Siege of Tortosa; Rhine campaign
- Awards: Order of the Holy Spirit; Order of the Golden Fleece

Jacques Bazin, marquis de Bezons (November 14, 1646 – May 22, 1733) was a French Field Marshal and Councillor of State.

He was the son of lawyer and politician Claude Bazin de Bezons and brother of Armand, Archbishop of Rouen and Archbishop of Bordeaux,

In his youth, he participated in the Siege of Candia and the Franco-Dutch War, where he was severely injured in the Battle of Seneffe. Promoted to brigadier in 1688, he commanded the reserve corps during the Battle of Steinkerque and the Battle of Neerwinden (1693).

In the War of the Spanish Succession, he fought in 1701 in Germany and then as Lieutenant-General in Italy, where he participated in the Battle of Chiari, Battle of Luzzara and the sieges of Governolo, Vercelli and Ivrea.
In 1708, he moved to Spain and fought in the successful Siege of Tortosa (1708). Named Marshal in 1709, he was unable to prevent Guido Starhemberg from taking Balaguer. In 1711, together with Henry d'Harcourt, he was made commander of the French Army in Germany. In the Rhine campaign (1713) his troops besieged and took Landau.

For his services during the war, he was awarded the cordon bleu of the Order of the Holy Spirit, and in Spain the Order of the Golden Fleece. After the death of Louis XIV, he became a member of the Council of State.

== See also ==
- Marshals of France

== Sources ==
- Gustave Chaix d'Est-Ange, Dictionnaire des familles françaises anciennes ou notables à la fin du XIXme siecle, Volume 3, C. Hérissey, 1904.
- Louis de La Roque, Catalogue historique des généraux français, Desaide, 1896.
- Madame de Sévigné, Lettres de madame de Sévigné, de sa famille et de ses amis at Google Books, Blaise, 1820
