= Nicolas Prosper Bauyn d'Angervilliers =

French politician (1675–1740)

Nicolas Prosper Bauyn Marquis d'Angervilliers
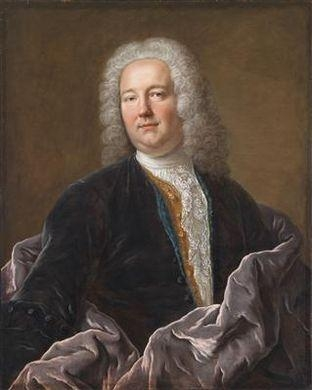

Secretary of State for War
- In office 23 May 1728 – 15 February 1740
- Monarch: Louis XV
- Preceded by: Claude le Blanc
- Succeeded by: François Victor Le Tonnelier de Breteuil

Personal details
- Born: 15 January 1669; Kingdom of France
- Died: 15 February 1740 (aged 65); Kingdom of France

Nicolas Prosper Bauyn, seigneur d’Angervilliers (15 January 1675 – 15 February 1740) was a French politician. He served as intendant de Dauphiné, intendant d'Alsace, and finally as Secretary of State for War from July 1728 until his death.

== Life ==
The son of a fermier général, Prosper Bauyn d'Angervilliers was intendant of the généralité of Alençon (1702–1705), then intendant of Dauphiné (1705–1716), of Alsace (1716–1724) and finally of Paris (1724–1728). An experienced administrator, the cardinal de Fleury made him secretary of state for war on the death of Claude le Blanc. In that post, he reorganised the gendarmerie and carried out preparations for the War of the Polish Succession. In order not to be reliant on imports, Louis XV had Angervilliers put in charge of setting up a white-metal factory to equip the army with swords and bayonets - this was set up in Klingenthal (Alsace) in 1730.

Preceded by Claude le Blanc	Secretary of State for War; 1728–1740	Succeeded by François Victor Le Tonnelier de Breteuil
