= Louis Nicolas Victor de Félix d'Ollières =

French soldier and statesman

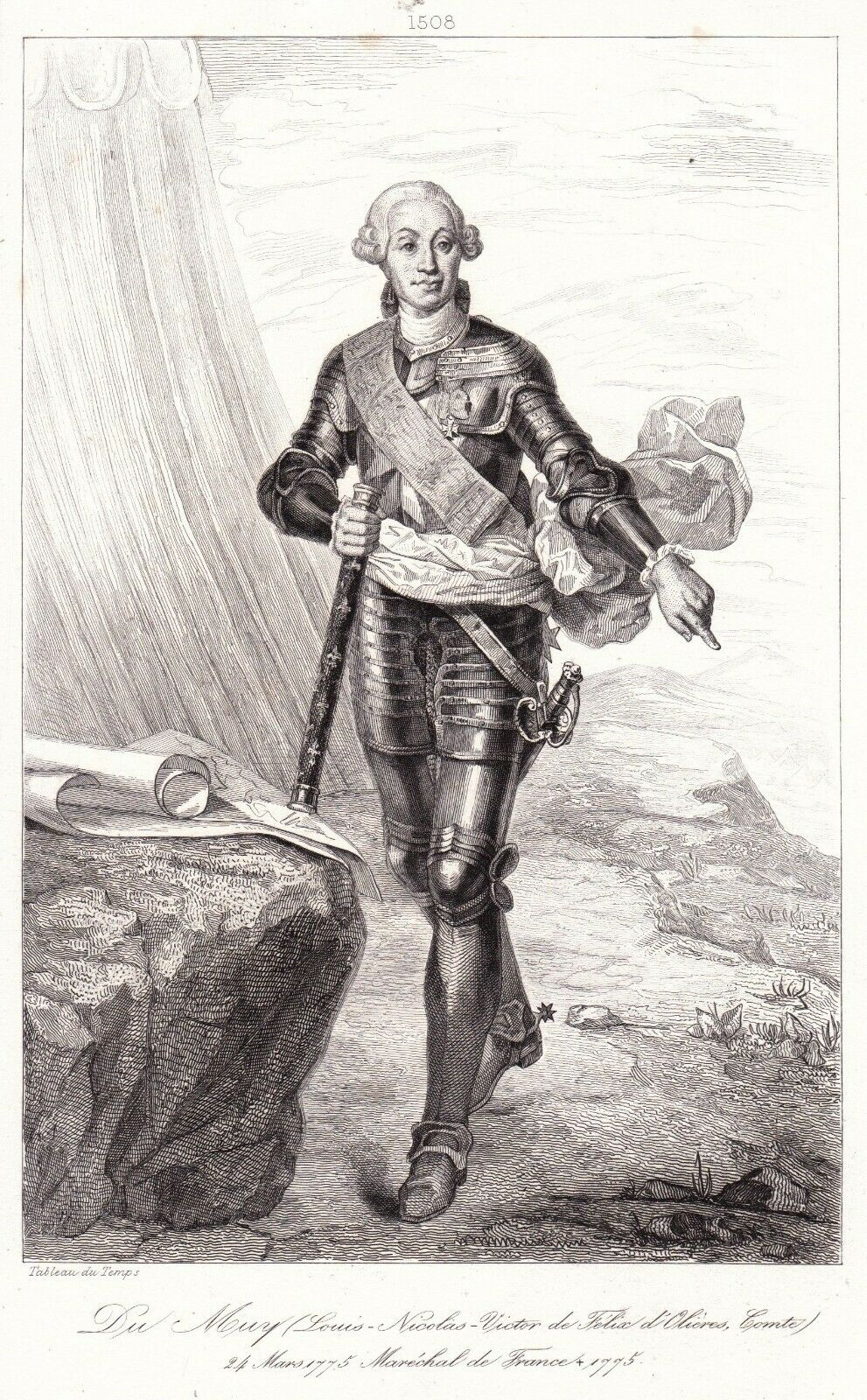

Louis Nicolas Victor de Félix d'Ollières (23 September 1711, Aix-en-Provence – 10 October 1775, Versailles), comte du Muy, comte de Grignan, was a French soldier and statesman from a family originating in Provence. He was made a member of the Ordre du Saint-Esprit in 1764.

Former menin of the Dauphin, he remained so attached to him that he asked to be buried at his feet in Sens. This request was also made to please Louis XVI. Like Maurepas he was made secretary of state for war on 5 June 1774. He was made marshal of France in 1775.

== Bibliography ==
- M. le Tourneur: l'Eloge de M. le maréchal du Muy: Bruxelles: 1778.
- Roux Alphéran: Les Rues d'Aix ou Recherches historiques sur l'ancienne capitale de provence, Bd. II, S. 433ff. Aix en Provence 1846. online - see Rue St. Michel

Political offices
Preceded by Emmanuel Armand de Vignerot du Plessis, Duke of Aiguillon	Secretary of State for War; 1774–1775	Succeeded by Claude Louis, Comte de Saint-Germain
