= Birgitte Sofie Gabel =

Danish noblewoman (1946-1969)

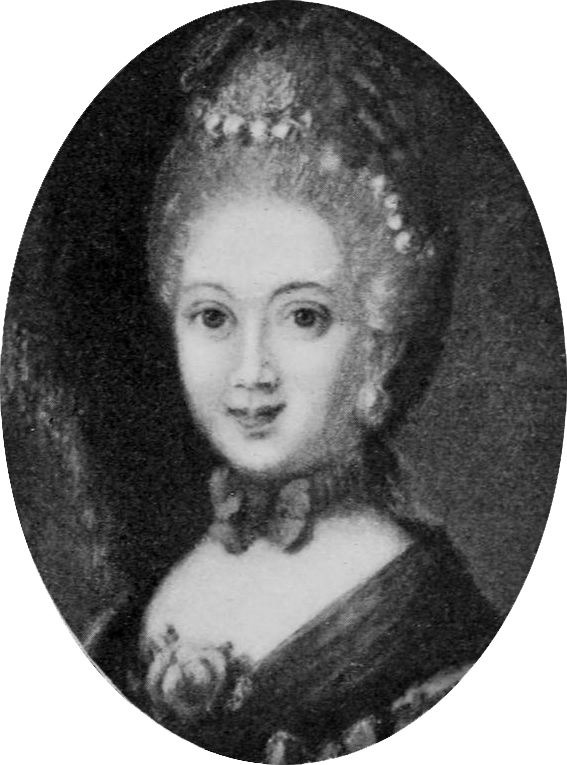
Birgitte Sofie Gabel

Birgitte Sofie Gabel (1746–1769) was a Danish noblewoman.

She was the daughter of Baron Verner Rosenkrantz and Else Margrete Sehested and married the courtier and nobleman Kristian Karl Gabel in 1762. She was known for her beauty and admired for her great intelligence and intellectual ability. The contemporary memoir writer count Rantzau-Ascheberg described her as a woman whose education and great scholarly knowledge could be compared to that of most men. She was given the Ordre de l'Union Parfaite in 1764.

It was noted that Christian VII of Denmark found her attractive and attempted to seduce her. In 1767, the circle around Claude Louis, Comte de Saint-Germain, wished to make her the official mistress of the monarch in order to divert him from politics and take over the de facto power over the government themselves. The plan failed because Gabel did not wish to become the king's mistress, as she found him repulsive and was in love with Prince Charles of Hesse-Kassel. The same year, Støvlet-Cathrine became the king's official mistress, but was exiled the following year.

According to contemporary reports, Johann Friedrich Struensee attempted to make her the official royal mistress of the king in 1769, claiming that it would benefit the mentally ill king's health to have an intelligent woman as a lover, and the nation, as it would make the king more easy to control. Reportedly, it was also Struensee's plan to become the lover of Gabel and through her control the king politically. Gabel made an attempt to be more encouraging to the king's attraction for her than she had been before, but after observing that the king's health and behavior did not improve and would likely not improve if she became his lover, she refused to go through with it. During her brief period in favor with the king, she reportedly tried to influence him to get rid of his favorite Conrad Holck, whom she despised.

She died in childbirth after having given birth to a dead daughter in mid-August 1769.
