= Menin (title) =

In Ancien Régime France, a menin (French pronunciation: [mənɛ̃]) was one of six gentlemen who were particularly attached to the person of the Dauphin of France. They were also known as gentilshommes de la manche. The word originates in the Portuguese word menino (masculine) or menina (feminine, as in the title of the Vélasquez painting Las Meninas), meaning boy or girl, where it denoted a young nobleman made a companion to the royal children. The word was used in France for the first time in 1680 when the household of Louis, Grand Dauphin was set up.

Holders of this office during the Ancien Régime included marquis de Dangeau, the marquis de Mimeure, and the comte du Muy. The Bourbon Restoration saw the return of many old court offices, and the duc d'Angoulême (dauphin from the accession of Charles X in 1824) also had menins, including the marquis d'Osmond.
