= Department of War (France) =

Ministerial department of the King's household during the Ancien Régime

- Département de la Guerre

Department overview
- Formed: 1 April 1547
- Dissolved: 25 May 1791
- Superseding Department: Ministry of War
- Headquarters: Hôtel de la Guerre, Versailles
- Minister responsible: Secretary of State for War
- Department executive: Secretary of State for War
- Parent department: King's Council
- Child agencies: French Royal Army; Maréchaussée; Frontier Border Troops

The Department of War (French: Département de la Guerre) was a ministerial department of the King's household (Maison du Roi) during the Ancien Régime in France. The department had control over the French Royal Army, Maréchaussée (military police), and the Frontier Border Troops. In 1791, as part of the governmental reforms carried out by the Constitutional Cabinet of Louis XVI, the department was abolished and subsequently reformed as the Ministry of War.

== History ==
The Department of War in France traces its origins to the Ancien Régime. Its functions developed gradually from the royal household’s military offices and were formally structured under Secretary of State Simon Fizes in 1570, marking the beginning of a continuous administrative department that oversaw military affairs until 1792.

The first Secretary of State for War was appointed by Henry II of France on 1 April 1547, and till 25 May 1791 became commonplace to have a 'Secretary of State for War' leading the department.

== Secretary of State for War ==
The secretary of state for war (French: Secrétaire d'État à la guerre), later secretary of state, minister for war (French: Secrétaire d'État, Ministre de la guerre), was one of the four or five specialized secretaries of state in France during the Ancien Régime. The position was responsible for the Army, for the Marshalcy, and for overseeing French border provinces.

== Organisation ==
The department was headed by the secretary of state for war who was appointed by the King. This department was in charge of the French Royal Army, the Maréchaussée, and the Frontier Border Troops. The department itself operated through special bureaus and administrative clerks. They were based out of the Hôtel de la Guerre in Versailles, which served as its administrative headquarters.

== List of schools ==
- Staff, Administration, and Officers' Schools
  - Brienne Military School – established in 1730, abolished in 1790
  - École Militaire – established in 1780
  - Metz Military School – established in 1720
- Combat Schools
  - Saumur Cavalry School – established in 1771
  - Royal School of Engineering of Mézières – established in 1748
  - Artillery Schools – all based at each artillery regiment's depot: La Fère, Besançon, Grenoble, Auxonne, Metz, Perpignan, and Valence

== See also ==
- Ancien Régime in France
- Early Modern France

== Sources ==
- Sarmant, Thierry (2007). Les ministres de la guerre, 1570-1792: histoire et dictionnaire biographique (in French). Belin. ISBN 978-2-7011-4505-1.
