= Rhine campaign of 1713 =

French military campaign

- Part of the War of the Spanish Succession
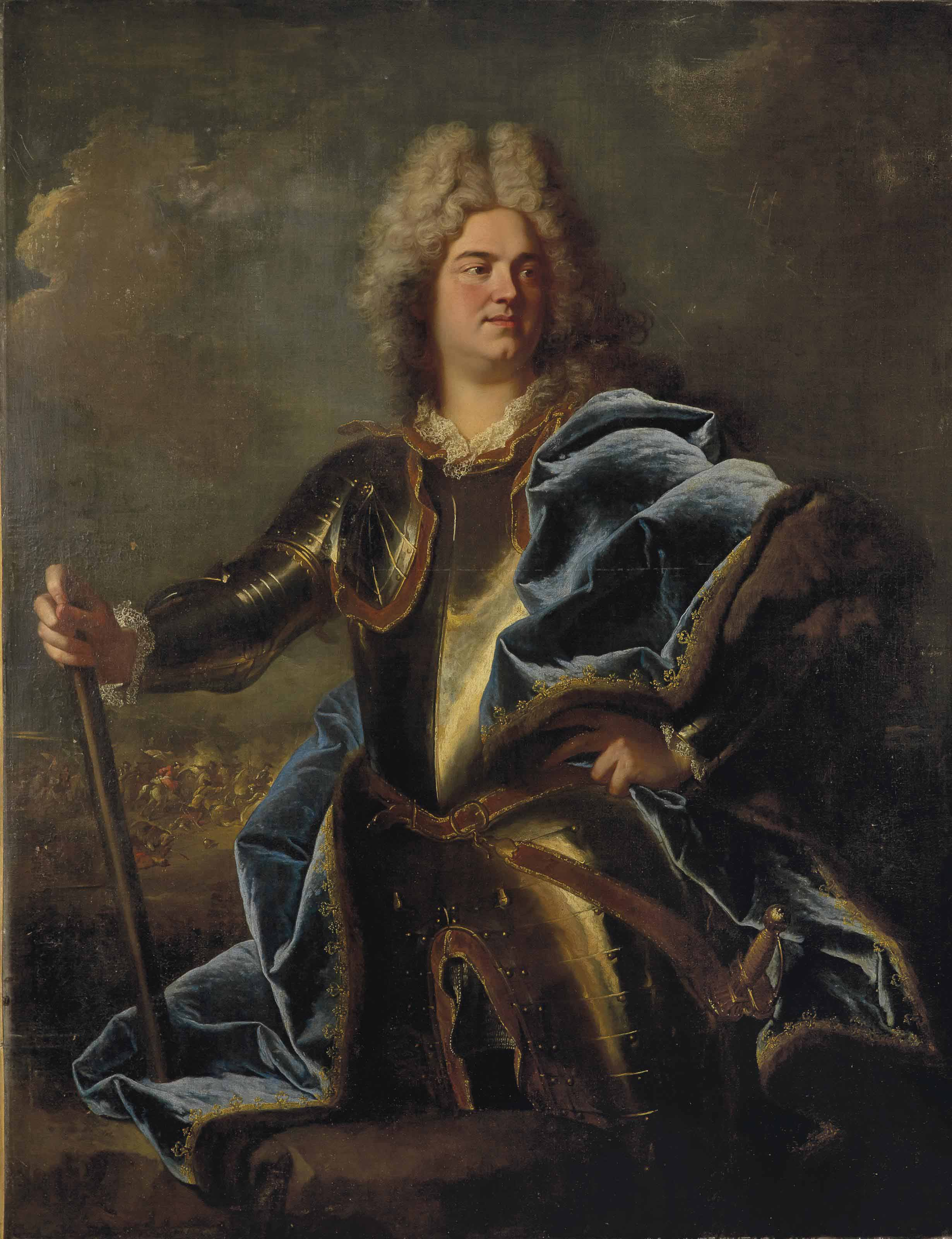
- A portrait of Claude de Villars
Date	May – November 1713
Location	Upper Rhine, Holy Roman Empire
Result	French victory

Belligerents
France	Austria

Commanders and leaders
(Kingdom of France) Claude de Villars (Kingdom of France) Marquis de Bezons (Kingdom of France) Arthur Dillon	(Habsburg monarchy) Eugene of Savoy (Habsburg monarchy) Duke of Württemberg

Strength
240 infantry battalions 300 cavalry squadrons	85 infantry battalions 115 cavalry squadrons

The Rhine campaign of 1713 was a successful French military campaign against the Holy Roman Empire, the sole remaining member of the once-formidable Grand Alliance which had refused to make peace with France. The campaign, which did not result in any pitched battles, ended with French forces besieging and capturing the fortified cities of Landau and Freiburg im Breisgau, which exposed the Palatinate, Württemberg and Swabia to French occupation and compelled the Emperor to sue for peace.

== Prelude ==
On 11 April 1713, the Treaty of Utrecht was signed between most participants in the War of the Spanish Succession: Spain and France against Great Britain, Portugal, Savoy and the Dutch Republic. The Habsburg monarchy and the Holy Roman Empire refused to sign the treaty and so remained at war against France.

Several factors influenced Emperor Charles VI's decision to carry on the war alone. A powerful faction in the Habsburg court (the so-called "Spanish party") was extremely vexed at having effectively lost the Spanish throne (seen as the war's principal stake and prize) when their allies recognized Philip V in the Peace of Utrecht, and only begrudgingly withdrew Imperial forces from Spain (the aggrieved Charles would style himself King of Spain and the Indies until 1725). This party lobbied successfully for a final campaign which would serve to extract additional concessions from France in compensation for this dynastic loss; to this end, Spain and Italy were stripped of troops for a campaign on the Rhine.

French domestic politics also held out possibilities. Louis XIV's advanced age and the sickly state of his infant heir fed the hope that France, too, could face a succession crisis and be driven to seek peace at any cost. Queen Anne's poor health also factored into Vienna's calculations.

== Campaign ==
By 1713, both France and the Holy Roman Empire were militarily depleted. France, confident that peace with Vienna would prevail, initially made few preparations for a new campaign, but when the Habsburgs made clear their intentions by marshalling on the Rhine, Louis was able to concentrate a large army opposite them, near Strasbourg, and a smaller force in support on the Sarre and Moselle; 300 squadrons and 240 battalions in all. Command of the army was given to Marshal Villars, the most successful French army commander of the war.

Eugene of Savoy moved all of his forces from the Spanish Netherlands to the upper Rhine to cooperate with the armies of the other German states. Now that the subsidies of the Maritime powers had ceased, the armies of the Holy Roman Empire were very much below strength. The combined army of Eugene of Savoy had only 115 squadrons and 85 battalions, more or less one third of the strength of the French army. This forced Eugene to entrench his main force behind the formidable Ettlingen Line of fortifications and cede the strategic initiative to Villars.

Villars was presented with several options. He could attempt to force the Rhine and seize certain strongpoints on the right bank, extracting tribute and materiel from the south German states to sustain his army and pressure the Emperor; a further push east into Bavaria would allow him to restore the Elector Maximilian, France's ally and client, to his throne. Less ambitiously, keeping to the left bank, Villars could subject the Electoral Palatinate to French occupation and compel it to contribute to France's war effort. Finally, Villars could attempt to eject Eugene from the Ettlingen Line, potentially opening all of Germany to French raids and occupation. Throughout the campaign, Villars would employ repeated feints along these axes to mask his intentions from Eugene and keep the Imperials bottled up behind the Lines of Ettlingen, unable to interfere with his siege operations.

On 3 June Villars concentrated at Fort-Louis and ostentatiously made preparations for a Rhine crossing, convincing the Imperials that he sought to turn the Ettlingen Line's flank; instead, the bulk of his army rapidly wheeled north, crossing the Queich and the Speyerbach. Seizing Speyer as a position from which to interdict any westward sally from Eugene, Villars detached the Marquis de Bezons to invest Landau on 24 June. The city, defended by Charles Alexander, Prince of Württemberg, held out for 52 days before surrendering on 20 August, two days after French sappers blew large breaches in its walls. In the meantime, Arthur Dillon had also taken Kaiserslautern. Villars denied the Imperials the honours of war and marched them into French captivity, an act seen by contemporaries as harsh conduct towards a garrison that had conducted a gallant defense (Villars was possibly motivated by Eugene's similar treatment of the French defenders of Le Quesnoy the previous year).

His hold over the Palatinate secured, Villars opted for a second offensive, into Württemberg and Swabia, to impose further economic and territorial pressure on the Emperor. To mask his movements, Villars crossed the Rhine with a detachment at Fort-Louis, again appearing to menace the Lines of Ettlingen, only for his main force to cross further south, at Kehl, near the Imperial fortress of Freiburg. Villars left a screening force along Ettlingen and departed for Kehl via Strasbourg, where he took command of the siege works and invested Freiburg on the night of 30 September–1 October. Racing to seize the city and its citadel ahead of the winter snows, Villars resorted to mass assaults by French grenadiers. A general assault breached the walls and carried the city on 2 November; to spare Freiburg further destruction (the French, having taken the place by storm, were not bound by the law of war or any articles of capitulation to provide for its welfare), the citadel's garrison obtained Eugene's permission to surrender on 16 November. Throughout, Eugene of Savoy could not risk battle and was reduced to the role of passive spectator.

Louis XIV now asked to open negotiations and was accepted by the Holy Roman Empire. Marshal Villars and Prince Eugene of Savoy met in the city of Rastatt in Baden-Baden and started a series of complex negotiations which lasted until 7 March 1714, when the Treaty of Rastatt was signed.

== Sources ==
- Lynn, John A (1999). The Wars of Louis XIV: 1667–1714. Longman. ISBN 0582056292.
- Oury, Clément (2020). La Guerre de succession d'Espagne : la fin tragique du Grand Siècle.
- THE WAR OF THE SPANISH SUCCESSION, CAMPAIGNS AND NEGOTIATIONS, By C. T. ATKINSON, M.A, pag. 435
- Les Bourbons. LES TRAITES DE RASTATT ET DE BADEN METTENT UN POINT FINAL A LA GUERRE DE SUCCESSION D'ESPAGNE
