= Alexandre Marie Léonor de Saint-Mauris de Montbarrey =

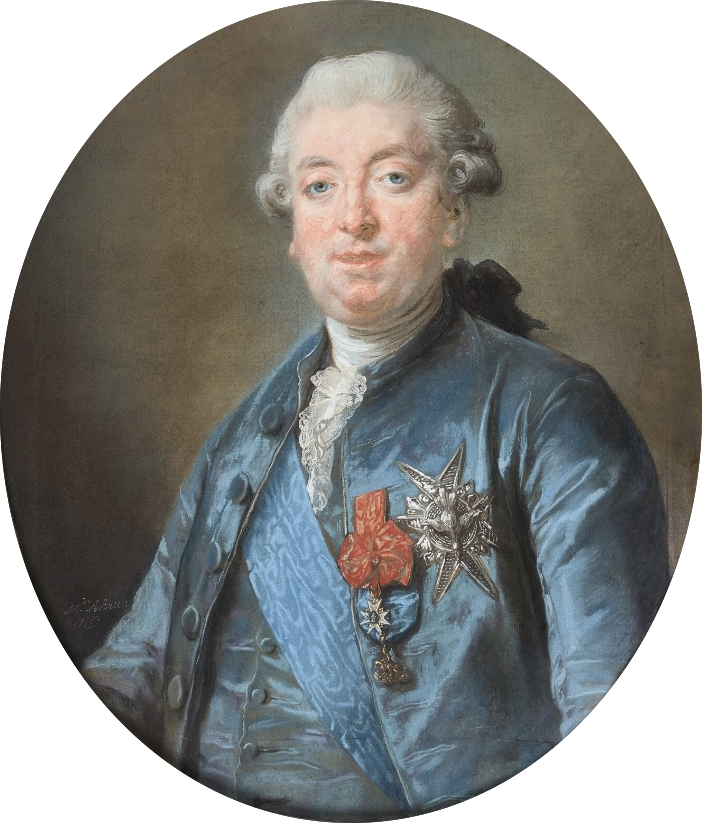
- Portrait of Prince de Montbarrey, by Élisabeth Vigée Le Brun.
- Born: 20 April 1732; Besançon
- Died: 5 May 1796 (aged 64)

Signature
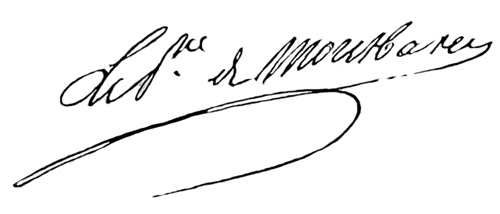

Alexandre Marie Eleonor of Saint-Mauris, count of Montbarrey, then prince of Montbarrey and Prince of the Holy Roman Empire (1774), grandee of Spain of first class (1780), knight of the Holy Spirit, lieutenant general (1780).

== Biography ==
Born in Besançon on 20 April 1732, he belonged to a family from Franche-Comté (Dole), ennobled in 1537 by letter of the Emperor Charles V in the person of Jean of Saint-Mauris, doctor of Law, professor at the University of Dole and counselor at the Parlement of Dole, and finally chief of the State Council of the Netherlands under Charles V and Philip II. The prince of Montbarrey was very proud about the origin of the nobility of his family and imbued with his titles of prince and grandee of Spain newly acquired (he paid 100,000 pounds for his title of prince of the Holy Roman Empire granted by the Emperor Joseph II), had been making a fake genealogy linking his family to the family of Saint-Moris-Salins, another family of old nobility from the same county.

The prince of Saint-Mauris-Montbarrey was the only son of lieutenant-general Claude Francois Elenonor of Saint-Mauris, count of Montbarrey (1694–1751) and Mary Therese Eleanor du Maine du Bourg (1711–1732). After an early and distinguished military career, the prince of Montbarrey came to the court of the king Louis XVI where he was protected by his parent Madame of Maurepas, wife of the marquis of Maurepas, prime minister of Louis XVI. Through her husband, Madame of Maurepas managed to appoint Montbarrey as director of war (position created especially for him without specific assignment) and deputy of the count of Saint-Germain, secretary of State for war. At the resignation of the count of Saint Germain, thanks to the influence of Madame of Maurepas, Montbarrey was appointed in 1778 as Secretary of State for war.

The prince of Montbarrey was an opportunistic and incompetent minister, without morality who involved more energy in his interests and lust with many mistresses than to conduct his department. In 1780, during the war with America, he had to leave his department following criticism of Necker on the misuse of military funds and the scandal raised by the revelation of a traffic of military appointments held by his mistress miss Renard. After his forced resignation, he moved with his wife and his daughter, the princess of Nassau-Saarbrücken to the Arsenal near the Bastille, in a luxurious building given by the king with a considerable pension. At the Revolution the furniture, library, gallery of paintings and art objects that decorated the residence of the prince of Montbarrey were seized as property of emigrants and sold to Lord Chattam (eldest son of British Prime Minister William Pitt) who took them to England.

During the storming of the Bastille, the prince of Montbarrey and his wife escaped the massacre by the crowd. At the beginning of the Revolution, he took refuge in his castle of Ruffey near Besançon. In 1791 he emigrated with his wife in Switzerland in Neuchâtel and in the villages of Cressier and Landeron (when they cross the border they had been robbed of all the money and jewelry they had with them). In January 1795 he moved to Constance where he died on 5 May 1796 in poverty. Upon his death, his widow returned from emigration and lived in Dole in Franche-Comté until her own death in 1819.

The prince of Montbarrey wrote autograph Memories (published in 1826), where pages after pages it extends on his genealogy, his relationships and energy to take advantage of his position as minister to advance his fortune and personal interest (in exchange for a refund by the royal treasury of the amount of three millions of doubtful debts of war claimed by the prince of Nassau-Saarbrücken, the prince of Montbarrey organized in 1779 the marriage of his daughter 20 years old with the crown prince of Nassau-Saarbrücken aged just 11 years)

== Marriage and issue ==
The prince of Montbarrey married on 29 October 1753 Parfaite Thais Françoise of Mailly-Nesle (born in 1737 – died in Dole on 23 April 1819.) Montbarrey and his wife had little affinity (he had throughout his life many mistresses and she was the mistress of the famous Masson of Pezay (1741–1777), soldier and writer). The prince of Montbarrey and his wife had two children:

- François Marie Louis Stanislas (as known as the prince of Saint-Mauris) born in 1756 – died guillotined in Paris on 17 June 1794 without descendants from his marriage on 25 November 1789 with Genevieve Andrault de Langeron (but with Louise Adrienne Cantagrelle he had an illegitimate son named François Maurice, born in Paris on 19 October 1789 that got the name of Saint-Mauris Montbarrey) We do not know what became of this child.
- Marie Françoise Maximilienne, born in 1759, wife of the last prince of Nassau-Saarbrücken (died in 1797) she had no child (she did not live with her husband).

The prince of Montbarrey had an official mistress during eight years (1767–1775), Jeanne Catherine Delachaux (born in Brussels on 4 May 1748 – died in Paris on 4 May 1818) who married at 27 years on 26 July 1775 the painter Francesco Giuseppe Casanova, brother of the famous Giacomo Casanova. She brought a dowry thanks to the generosity of the prince of Montbarrey. Francesco Casanova recognized the two illegitimate children of the prince of Montbarrey as his own. The marriage did not last because Casanova abandoned his wife in 1783.

One of the two illegitimate children of Jeanne Catherine Delachaux and the prince of Montbarrey recognized by Francesco Casanova was known as Alexandre Benoit Jean Dufay, Casanova (born in Paris in 1770 – died in Paris in 1844). He had as teacher the famous painter David, but did not get a great success. At the end of his life, he took the title of painter of the King of Oudh (India) to have been the official painter of this monarch in Lucknow from 1834 to 1837. His brother (also illegitimate son of the prince of Montbarrey) emigrated and joined the army of the princes abroad before returning to live in Paris where he died before 1844. We do not know whether the two sons of the prince of Montbarrey and Jeanne Catherine Delachaux had descendants.

Maximilienne of Saint-Mauris-Montbarrey, princess of Nassau-Saarbrücken, daughter of the prince of Montbarrey, died on 2 February 1838 in Maisons-Alfort (near Paris), aged 79 years old. She was the last of his family and of the name of Saint-Mauris-Montbarrey. His heir was his cousin the duke of Avaray.

Political offices
Preceded by Claude-Louis de Saint-Germain	Secretary of State for War; 1778–1780	Succeeded by Philippe Henri de Ségur
