= Jacques-Louis de Valon =

French soldier and poet

Jacques Louis Valon, Marquis de Mimeure (19 November 1659, Dijon – 3 March 1719) was a French soldier and poet.

Menin to Louis, Grand Dauphin, he entered on a military career and became lieutenant général. King Louis XIV promoted the territory of Mimeure to a marquisate around 1697 for him.

He wrote many verses which were not printed. Backed by François Louis de Bourbon-Conti, Madame de Montespan, and Nicolas Boileau, he was elected to seat 3 of the Académie française on 2 December 1707. His acceptance speech is said to have been written by Antoine Houdar de la Motte. Valon's last known literary work is a 1715 ode in imitation of Horace. The rue de Mimeure in his birthplace is named after him.
