= François Victor Le Tonnelier de Breteuil =

French nobleman (1686–1743)

François Victor Le Tonnelier de Breteuil Marquis de Fontenay-Trésigny, Marquis de Breteuil
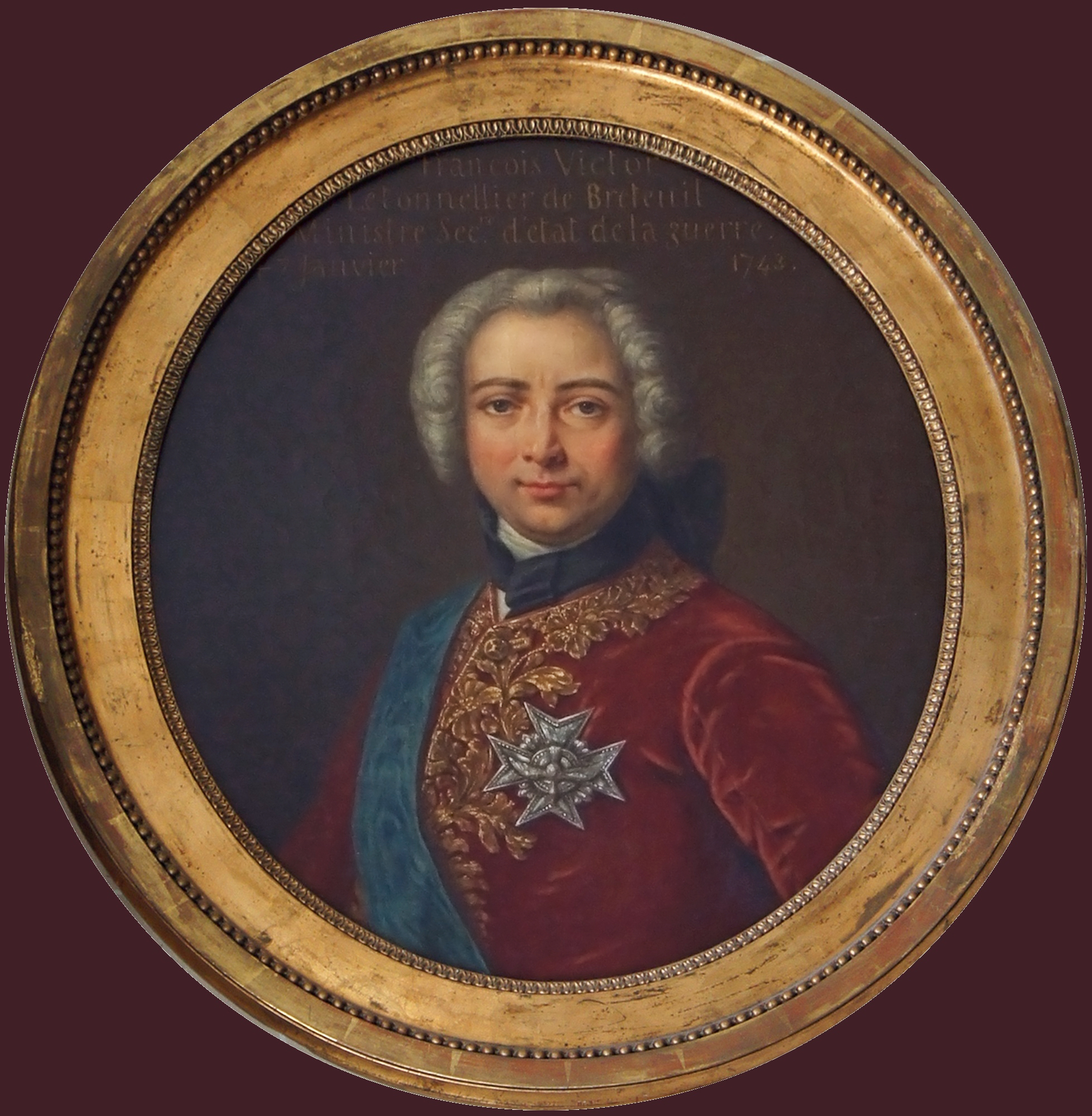

Secretary of State for War
- In office 4 July 1723 – 16 June 1726
- Monarch: Louis XV
- Preceded by: Claude le Blanc
- Succeeded by: Claude le Blanc
- In office 20 February 1740 – 7 January 1743†
- Monarch: Louis XV
- Preceded by: Nicolas Prosper Bauyn d'Angervilliers
- Succeeded by: Marc-Pierre de Voyer de Paulmy d'Argenson

Personal details
- Born: 17 April 1686 Kingdom of France
- Died: 7 January 1743 (aged 56) Issy-les-Moulineaux, Isle-de-France, Kingdom of France

François Victor Le Tonnelier de Breteuil (17 April 1686 – 7 January 1743 in Issy) was a French nobleman. He was minister for war twice under Louis XV. He was also chancelier, garde des sceaux de la Maison de la reine and commander, provost and grandmaster of ceremonies to the Order of the Holy Spirit (1721–1743).

He was a member of the Le Tonnelier de Breteuil family. He was the marquis of Fontenay-Trésigny, sire de Villebert, seigneur de Breteuil, du Mesnil-Chassemartin, des Chapelles, de Villenevotte et de Palaiseau, baron de Boitron et de Preuilly.
