= Claude Louis Hector de Villars, 1st Duke of Villars =

Marshal General of France

Marshal General Claude Louis Hector de Villars GE
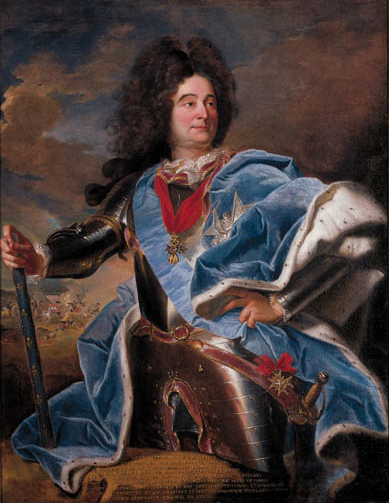
- Portrait by Hyacinthe Rigaud, 1704

Secretary of State for War
- In office 1 October 1715 – 24 September 1718
- Monarch: Louis XV
- Preceded by: Daniel Voysin de la Noiraye
- Succeeded by: Claude le Blanc

Personal details
- Born: 8 May 1653 Moulins, Kingdom of France
- Died: 17 June 1734 (aged 81) Turin, Kingdom of Sardinia
- Spouse: Jeanne Angélique Roque
- Children: Honoré Armand de Villars
- Parents: Pierre de Villars (father); Marie Gigault (mother)

Military service
- Allegiance: France
- Branch/service: French Army
- Years of service: 1671–1734
- Rank: Marshal General
- Battles/wars: Franco-Dutch War: Siege of Maastricht; Battle of Seneffe; Nine Years' War; War of the Camisards; War of the Spanish Succession: Battle of Friedlingen; Siege of Kehl (1703); First Battle of Höchstädt; Battle of Malplaquet (WIA); Battle of Denain; Siege of Bouchain (1712); Rhine campaign; War of the Polish Succession

Claude Louis Hector de Villars, Prince of Martigues, Marquis then (1st) Duke of Villars, Viscount of Melun (French pronunciation: [klod lwi ɛktɔʁ də vilaʁ]; 8 May 1653 – 17 June 1734) was a French military commander and an illustrious general of Louis XIV. He was one of only six Marshals to have been promoted Marshal General of France. Villars is considered one of the great military commanders produced by his time.

== Early career ==
Villars was born at Moulins (in the present-day département of Allier) in a noble but poor family, his father was the diplomat Pierre de Villars. He entered the French army through the corps of pages in 1671 and distinguished himself at the age of twenty in the Siege of Maastricht in 1673 during the Franco-Dutch War where contemporaries such as John Churchill and Boufflers were also present and again at the bloody Battle of Seneffe. A year later he was promoted on the field to mestre de camp (colonel) of a cavalry regiment.

The next promotion would take time in spite of a long record of service under Turenne, The Great Condé and Luxembourg, and of his aristocratic birth, as he had incurred the enmity of the powerful Louvois. He was finally made maréchal de camp in 1687.

In the interval between the Dutch wars and the formation of the League of Augsburg, Villars, who combined with his military gifts the tact and subtlety of a diplomat, was employed in an unofficial mission to the court of Bavaria, and there became the constant companion of Elector Maximilian II Emanuel.

Villars was also in charge of commanding Bavarian forces during the Battle of Mohács in 1687 where contemporaries such as the Duke of Berwick and Eugene of Savoy were present.

He returned to France in 1690 and was given a command in the cavalry of the army in Flanders, but towards the end of the War of the Grand Alliance, in 1698, he went to Vienna as ambassador and served from 1698 to 1701.

== War of the Spanish Succession ==
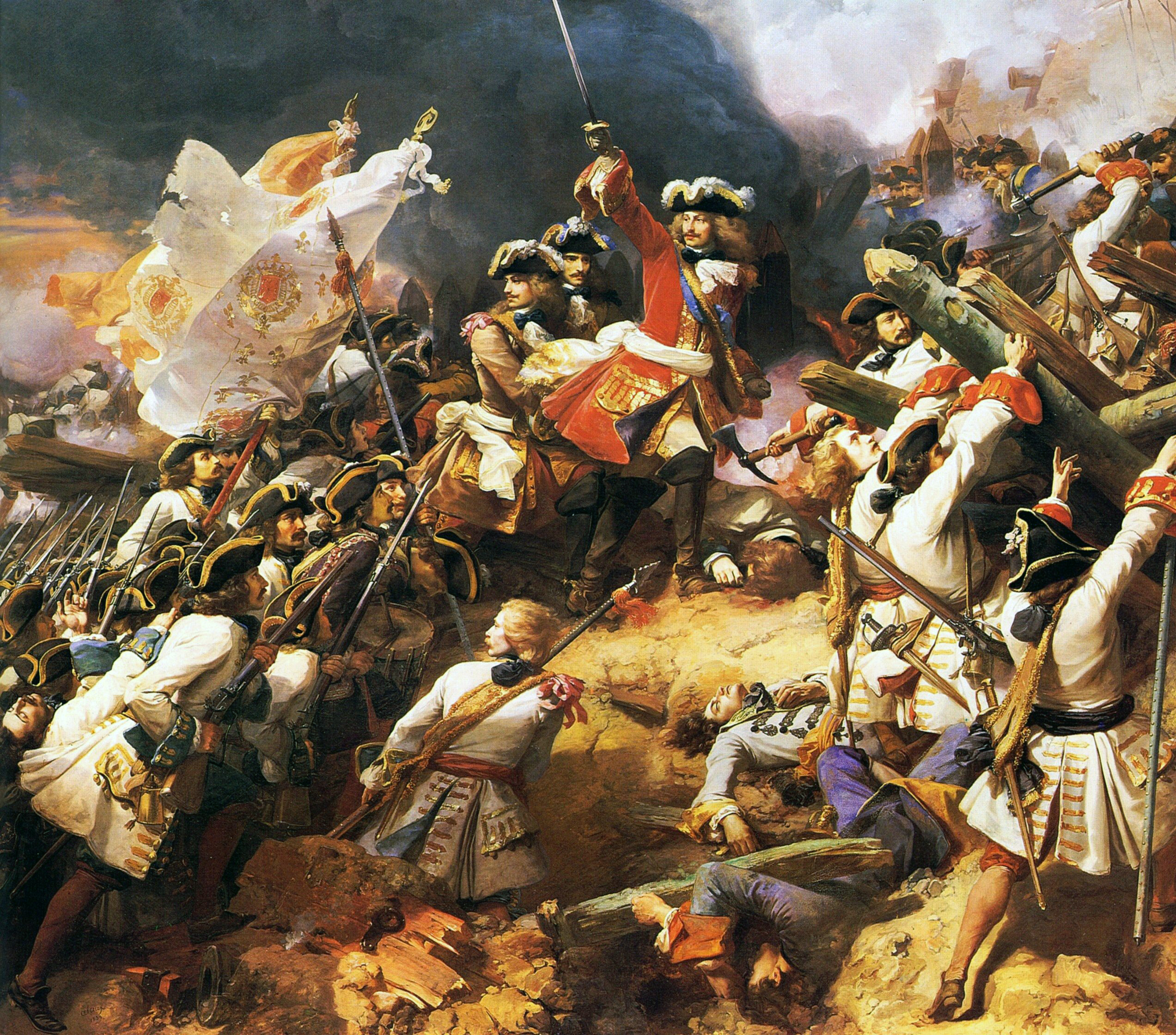
The Battle of Denain by Jean Alaux, 1839. Villars winning his most important victory at the Battle of Denain in 1712

It was Villars' part in the next war, beginning with Friedlingen (1702) and Hochstadt (1703) and ending with Denain (1712), that has made him most famous. For his part in the battle of Friedlingen he received the marshalate, and for the pacification of the insurgent Cévennes he received the Saint-Esprit order and the title of duke. Friedlingen and Hochstadt were barren victories, and the campaigns of which they formed were characterised by lost opportunities. All the same, Villars managed to defend the frontier along the Moselle near Sierck, in June 1705, by depriving Marlborough of forage and refusing to be lured into battle by that duke despite his slightly more numerous army. The two opposing commanders were friends, and exchanged captives and gifts during the stand off. Villars' career culminated from 1709 onwards when France, close to total defeat, managed to survive.

In that year he was called to command the main army opposing Prince Eugène of Savoy and Marlborough on the northern frontier. During the famine of the winter he shared the soldiers' rations. When the campaign opened the old Marshal Boufflers volunteered to serve under him, but they were unable to prevent the Allies from capturing Tournai and Mons. After the Battle of Malplaquet in September 1709, in which Villars was gravely wounded (by a musketball to the knee), he was able to tell the king: "If God grants us the grace to lose such a battle again, Your Majesty can count on all of his enemies being destroyed".

Two more campaigns passed without a battle and with scarcely any advance on the part of the invaders, but at last Marlborough manoeuvred Villars out of the famous Ne plus ultra lines, and the power of the defence seemed to be broken. But Louis made a last effort, the English contingent and its leader were withdrawn from the enemy's camp, and Villars, though still recovering from his Malplaquet wounds, outmanoeuvred and decisively defeated Eugène at Denain. The French followed up this success by retaking several lost fortresses, culminating in the Siege of Bouchain (1712).

This victory saved France, though the war dragged on for another year, where Villars led the Rhine campaign (1713), in which he took Landau, led the stormers at Freiburg and negotiated the Treaty of Rastatt and the Treaty of Baden with Prince Eugène.

As a result of his contribution, his title was granted Grandee of Spain status by Philip V.

== Villars residence ==
Villars, named for Marshal Villars, was built in Moulins, Allier during the reign of Louis XV. The 18th century historical monument was used as a cavalry barracks. It was partially destroyed during World War II and was restored by François Voinchet, Architect of Historic Monuments and is now the Centre National du Costume de Scene museum.

== Regency ==
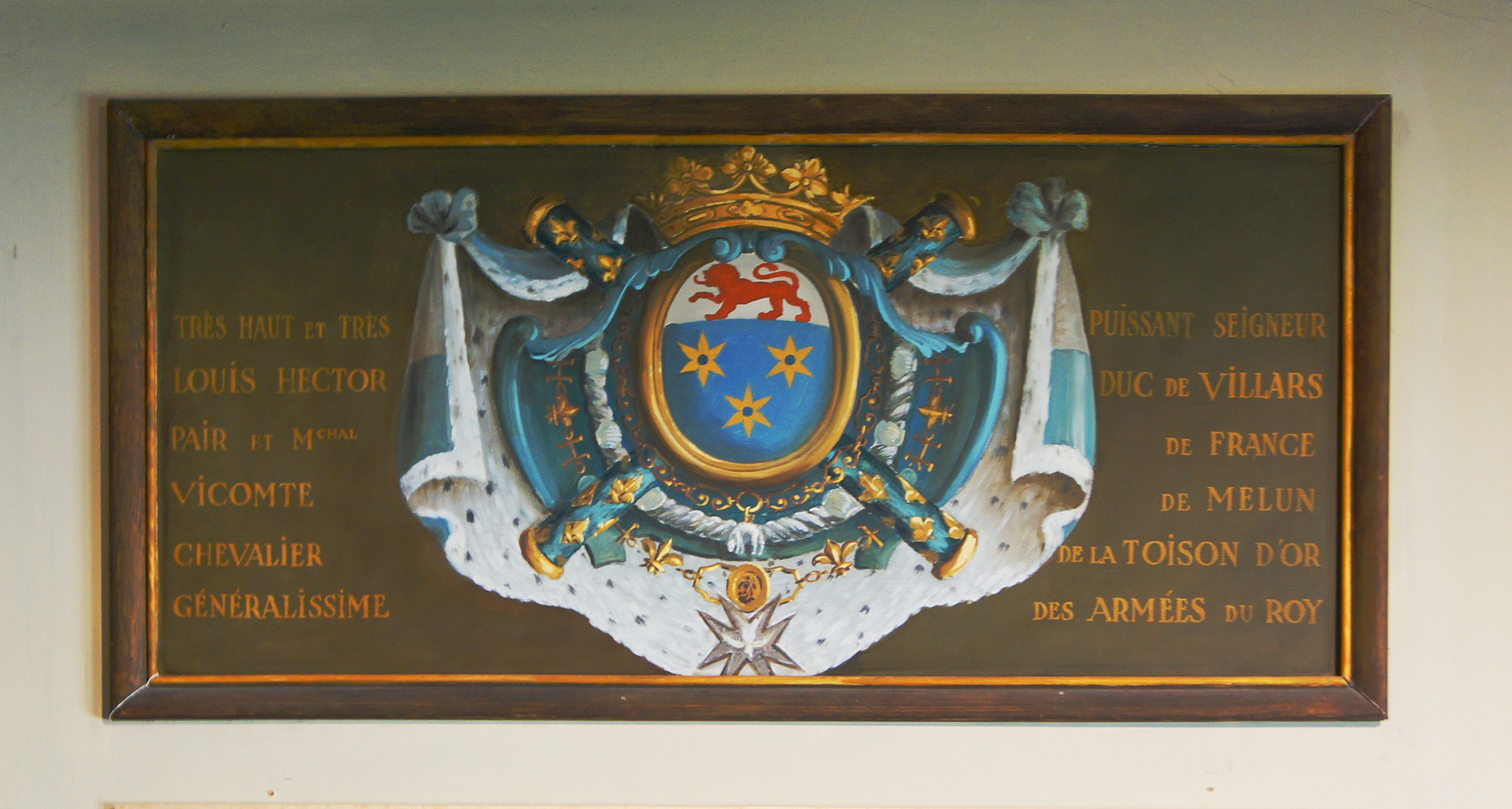
Coat of Arms of duc de Villars in Vaux-le-Vicomte castle

Villars played a conspicuous part in the politics of the Regency period as the principal opponent of Cardinal Dubois, and only the memories of Montmorency's rebellion prevented his being made constable of France. He took the field for the last time in the War of the Polish Succession (1734), with the title marshal-general of the king's armies, that Turenne had held before him. But he was over eighty years old at this point, and after opening the campaign energetically he died at Turin on 17 June 1734.

== Marriage and issue ==
On 1 February 1702, he married Jeanne Angélique Roque with whom he had a son:

1. Honoré Armand de Villars, 2nd Duke of Villars (4 October 1702 - May 1770) married Amable Gabrielle de Noailles and had a daughter.

== Legacy ==
Villars's memoirs show us a fanfaron plein d'honneur, as Voltaire calls him. He was indeed boastful, and also covetous of honours and wealth. But he was also described as an honourable man of high courage, moral and physical, and certainly a very skilled soldier. He was famous for his love for young men as wrote the Duchess of Orleans in her letters.

The memoirs, part of which was published in 1734 and afterwards several times republished in untrustworthy versions, were for the first time completely edited by the Marquis of Vogüé in 1884–92.

Political offices
Preceded by Daniel Voysin de la Noiraye	Secretary of State for War; 1 October 1715 – 24 September 1718	Succeeded by Claude le Blanc
