= Secretary of State for War (France) =

- Secrétaire d'État à la guerre
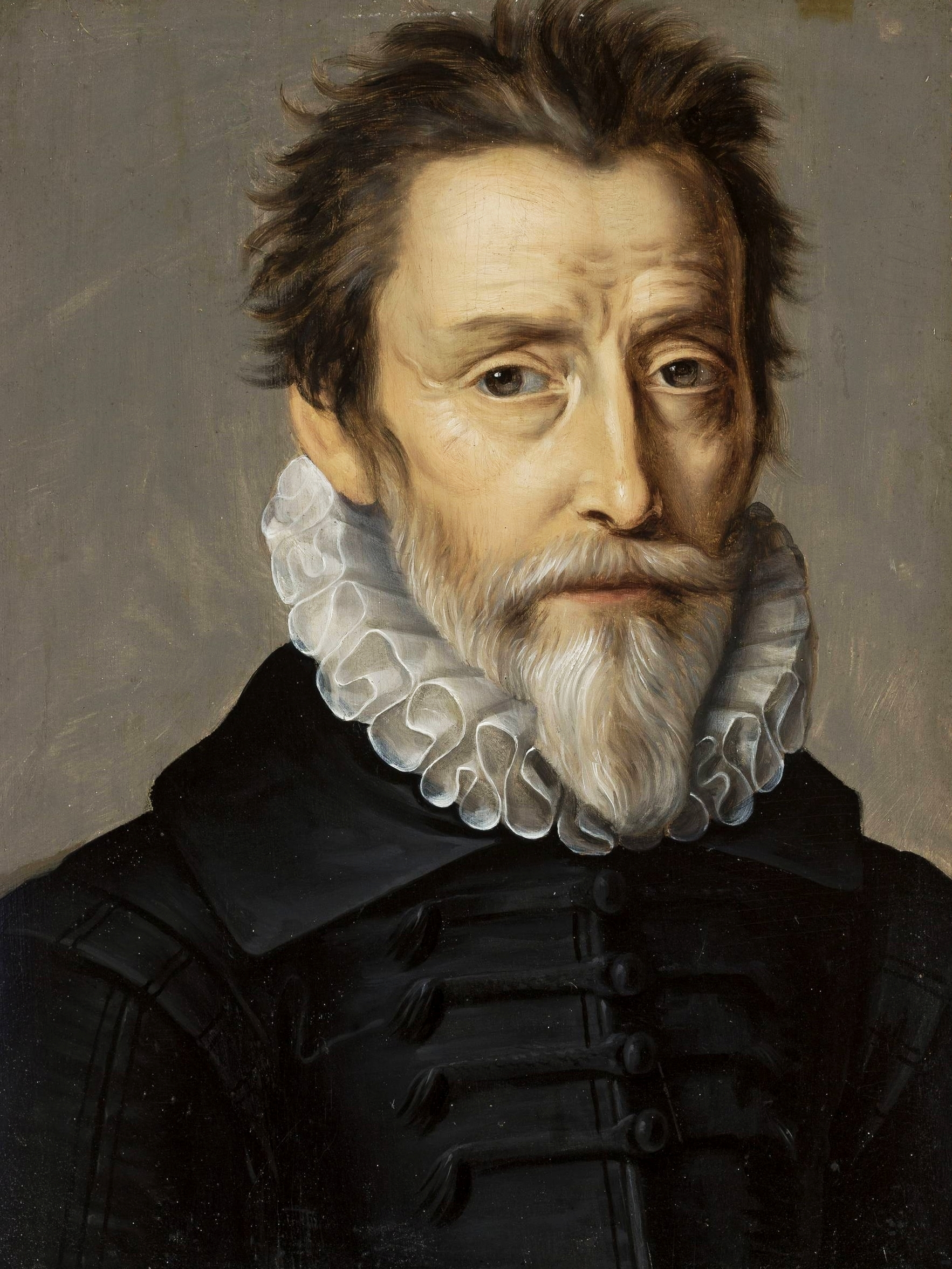
- Longest serving Nicolas de Neufville (25 October 1567 – 8 September 1588; 30 September 1594 – 4 March 1606)
- (Kingdom of France) Department of War
- Member of: Conseil du Roi: Conseil d'État
- Reports to: King of France
- Term length: No fixed term
- Formation: 1 April 1547; 479 years ago
- First holder: Guillaume Bochetel
- Final holder: Louis Lebègue Duportail (Note: Remained in office as Minister of War.)
- Abolished: 25 May 1791; 235 years ago
- Succession: Minister of War

The secretary of state for war (French: Secrétaire d'État à la guerre), later secretary of state, minister for war (French: Secrétaire d'État, Ministre de la guerre), was one of the four or five specialized secretaries of state in France during the Ancien Régime. The position was responsible for the Army, for the Marshalcy and for overseeing French border provinces. In 1791, during the French Revolution, the secretary of state for war became titled minister of war.

== List of secretaries ==
No.	Portrait	Name	Term			King	Ref.
No.	Portrait	Name	Took office	Left office	Time in office	King	Ref.
Appointment of the first four Secretaries of State by Henry II on 1 April 1547.
1		Guillaume Bochetel; Seigneur de Sassy, de Brouillamenon, de Laforest-Thaumyer	1 April 1547	? ? 1558†	10 years, 275 days	Henry II	
2		Claude II de l'Aubespine; Seigneur de Hauterive, Baron de Châteauneuf	1 April 1547	11 November 1567†	20 years, 224 days	Henry II; Francis II; Charles IX	
3		Côme Clausse; Seigneur de Marchaumont, de Fleury, de Courances	1 April 1547	? ? 1558†	10 years, 275 days	Henry II	
4		Jean du Thier; Seigneur de Beauvoir	1 April 1547	11 November 1559†	11 years, 275 days	Henry II; Francis II	
5		Jacques Bourdin; Seigneur de Villeines	? ? 1558	6 July 1567†	9 years, 186 days	Henry II; Francis II; Charles IX	
6		Florimond II Robertet; Seigneur de Fresne	? ? 1558	? October 1567†	9 years, 273 days	Henry II; Francis II; Charles IX	
7		Florimond III Robertet; Baron d'Alluye	? ? 1559	? June 1569†	8 years, 151 days	Francis II; Charles IX	
8		Claude III de l'Aubespine; Seigneur de Hauterive, Baron de Châteauneuf	? ? 1567	11 September 1570†	3 years, 253 days	Charles IX	
9		Simon Fizes; Baron de Sauves	22 October 1567	27 November 1579†	12 years, 36 days	Charles IX; Henry III	
10		Nicolas de Neufville; Marquis de Villeroy	25 October 1567	8 September 1588	20 years, 319 days	Charles IX; Henry III	
11		Pierre de Brûlart; Seigneur de Genlis, Seigneur de Crosne	8 June 1569	8 September 1588	19 years, 92 days	Charles IX; Henry III	
12		Claude Pinart; Baron de Cremailles, Baron de Malines, Baron de Valois	13 September 1570	8 September 1588	17 years, 361 days	Charles IX; Henry III	
Effective creation of the office in 1588. Previous holders were Secretaries of State, but the offices indistincts.
13		Louis de Revol	15 September 1588	24 September 1594†	6 years, 9 days	Henry III; Henry IV	
(10)		Nicolas de Neufville; Marquis de Villeroy	30 September 1594	4 March 1606	11 years, 155 days	Henry IV	
14		Pierre de Brûlart; Marquis de Sillery, Vicomte de Puisieux, Baron du Grand-Pressigny	4 March 1606	9 August 1616	10 years, 158 days	Henry IV; Louis XIII	
Interim by Claude Mangot, Seigneur de Villeran, d'Orgères, de Villarceaux, from 9 August to 25 November 1616.							
Interim by Cardinal Armand Jean du Plessis, Duc de Richelieu, Duc de Fronsac, on 25 November 1616 to 24 April 1617.
(14)		Pierre de Brûlart; Marquis de Sillery, Vicomte de Puisieux, Baron du Grand-Pressigny	24 April 1617	5 February 1624	6 years, 287 days	Louis XIII	
15		Charles Le Beauclerc; Seigneur d'Achères, Seigneur de Rougemont	5 February 1624	12 October 1630†	6 years, 249 days	Louis XIII	
16		Abel Servien; Marquis de Sablé, Marquis de Boisdauphin, Comte de La Roche des Aubiers	11 December 1630	12 February 1636	5 years, 63 days	Louis XIII	
17		François Sublet; Baron de Dangu, Seigneur de Noyers	12 February 1636	10 April 1643	7 years, 57 days	Louis XIII	
18		Michel Le Tellier; Marquis de Barbezieux, Seigneur de Chaville, d'Étang, de Viroflay	13 April 1643	19 July 1651	8 years, 97 days	Louis XIII; Louis XIV	
19		Henri-Auguste de Loménie; Comte de Brienne	19 July 1651	27 December 1651	161 days	Louis XIV	
20		Michel Le Tellier; Marquis de Barbezieux, Seigneur de Chaville, d'Étang, de Viroflay	27 December 1651	27 October 1677	25 years, 304 days	Louis XIV	
21		François Michel Le Tellier; Marquis de Louvois	27 October 1677	16 July 1691†	13 years, 262 days	Louis XIV	
22		Louis François Marie Le Tellier; Marquis de Barbezieux	16 July 1691	5 January 1701†	9 years, 173 days	Louis XIV	
23		Michel de Chamillart; Seigneur de Montfermeil	8 January 1701	9 June 1709	8 years, 155 days	Louis XIV	
24		Daniel François Voysin; Seigneur de Mesnil-Voysin, de Bouray, du Plessis, de La Noiraye, de Janville, de Lardy	9 June 1709	14 September 1715	6 years, 97 days	Louis XIV; Louis XV; Régence	
Interim by Claude Louis Hector, Prince de Martigues, Duc de Villars, Vicomte de Melun, on 26 November 1715.							
Interim by Louis Phélypeaux, Marquis de La Vrillière, on 14 October 1715.
Interim by Joseph Jean Baptiste Fleuriau, Marquis d'Armenonville, on 14 February 1716.
25		Claude le Blanc	24 September 1718	1 July 1723	4 years, 280 days	Louis XV; Régence	
26		François Victor Le Tonnelier; Marquis de Fontenay-Trésigny, Marquis de Breteuil	4 July 1723	16 June 1726	2 years, 347 days	Louis XV	
(25)		Claude le Blanc	16 June 1726	19 May 1728†	1 year, 338 days	Louis XV	
28		Nicolas Prosper Bauyn; Seigneur d’Angervilliers	23 May 1728	15 February 1740†	11 years, 268 days	Louis XV	
29		François Victor Le Tonnelier; Marquis de Fontenay-Trésigny, Marquis de Breteuil	20 February 1740	7 January 1743†	2 years, 321 days	Louis XV	
29		Marc Pierre de Voyer; Marquis de Paulmy, Comte d'Argenson	8 January 1743	2 February 1757	14 years, 25 days	Louis XV	
30		Marc Antoine René de Voyer; Marquis de Paulmy, Marquis d'Argenson	3 February 1757	4 March 1758	1 year, 29 days	Louis XV	
31		Charles Louis Auguste Fouquet; Duc de Belle-Isle	4 March 1758	26 January 1761†	2 years, 328 days	Louis XV	
32		Étienne François; Marquis de Stainville, Duc de Choiseul	27 January 1761	24 December 1770	9 years, 331 days	Louis XV	
Interim by Louis Phélypeaux, Comte de Saint-Florentin, Duc de La Vrillière, Secretary of State for the King's Household, from 24 December 1770 to 4 January 1771.
33		Louis François; Marquis de Monteynard	4 January 1771	28 January 1774	3 years, 24 days	Louis XV	
34		Emmanuel Armand de Vignerot du Plessis-Richelieu; Duc d'Aiguillon, Duc d'Agénois	28 January 1774	2 June 1774	125 days	Louis XV; Louis XVI	
35		Louis Nicolas Victor de Félix d'Ollières; Comte du Muy, Comte de Grignan	9 June 1774	10 October 1775†	1 year, 123 days	Louis XVI	
36		Claude Louis Robert; Comte de Saint-Germain	25 October 1775	23 September 1777	1 year, 333 days	Louis XVI	
37		Alexandre Marie Léonor de Saint-Mauris; Comte de Montbarrey	27 September 1777	15 December 1780	3 years, 79 days	Louis XVI	
Interim by Charles Gravier, Comte de Vergennes, Secretary of State for Foreign Affairs, from 15 December to 23 December 1780.
38		Philippe Henri; Marquis de Ségur	23 December 1780	27 August 1787	6 years, 247 days	Louis XVI	
Interim by Louis Auguste Le Tonnelier, Baron de Breteuil, Baron de Preuilly, Secretary of State for the King's Household, from 27 August to 23 September 1787.
39		Athanase Louis Marie de Loménie; Comte de Brienne	23 September 1787	21 August 1788	272 days	Louis XVI	
40		Louis Pierre de Chastenet; Comte de Puységur	30 November 1788	12 July 1789	224 days	Louis XVI	
41		Victor François; Duc de Broglie	12 July 1789	16 July 1789	4 days	Louis XVI	
Office vacant from 16 July to 4 August 1789.
42		Jean-Frédéric de la Tour du Pin de Gouvernet; Comte de Paulin	4 August 1789	16 November 1790	1 year, 104 days	Louis XVI	
43		Louis Lebègue Duportail	16 November 1790	25 May 1791	190 days	Louis XVI	

== See also ==
- Ancien Régime in France
- Early Modern France
