= Michel Chamillart =

French politician

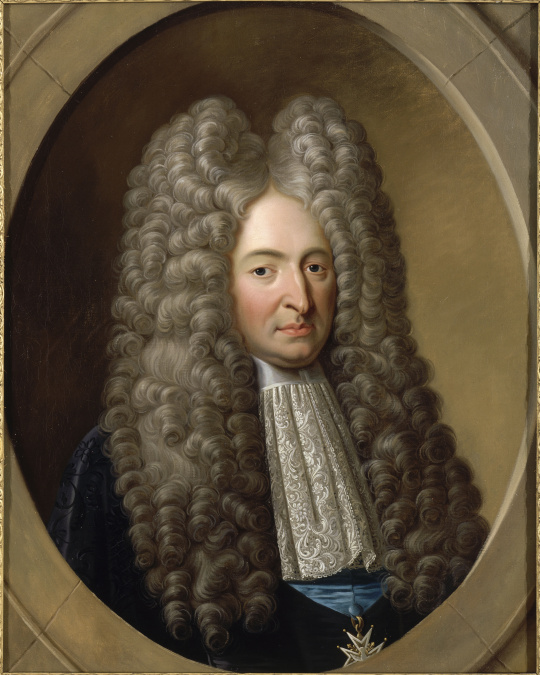
Michel Chamillart

Michel Chamillart or Chamillard (2 January 1652 – 14 April 1721) was a French statesman, a minister of King Louis XIV.

Chamillart was born in Paris of a family recently raised to the nobility. Following the usual career of a statesman of his time he became in turn councillor of the parlement of Paris (1676), master of requests (1686), and intendant of the generality of Rouen (January 1689). His attractive personality won the confidence of Madame de Maintenon and pleased the king. In 1690 he was made intendant of finances, and on 5 September 1699 the king appointed him Controller-General of Finances, to which he added on the following 7 January the ministry of war. From the first, Chamillart's position was a difficult one. The deficit was more than 53 million livres, and the credit of the state was almost exhausted. Chamillart lacked the intelligence and energy necessary for the situation, and was unable to moderate the king's warlike tastes, or to inaugurate economic reforms. He could only employ the usual expedients of the time—the immoderate sale of offices, the debasement of the coinage (five times in six years), reduction of the rate of interest on state debts, and increased taxation.

Chamillart attempted to force into circulation a kind of paper money, billets de monnaie, with disastrous results owing to the state of credit. He studied Vauban's project for the royal tithe, and Boisguillebert's proposition for the taille, but did not adopt them. In October 1706 he showed the king that the debts immediately due amounted to 288 million, and that the deficit already foreseen for 1707 was 160 million. In October 1707 he saw with consternation that the revenue for 1708 was already entirely eaten up by anticipation, so that neither money nor credit remained for 1708. In these conditions Chamillart, who had often complained of the overwhelming burden he was carrying, and who had already wished to retire in 1706, resigned his office of controller-general. Public opinion attributed to him the ruin of the country, though he had tried in 1700 to improve the condition of commerce by the creation of a council of commerce.

As secretary of state for war he was responsible for raising an army for the War of the Spanish Succession, and had to reorganize it three times, after the defeats of 1704, 1706 and 1708. With an empty treasury he succeeded only in part, and he warned the king that the enemy would soon be able to dictate the terms of peace. He was reproached with having secured the command of the army which besieged Turin (1706) for his son-in-law, the incapable duc de la Feuillade. Even Madame de Maintenon became hostile to him, and he was dismissed from his position on 9 June 1709, retiring to his estates.

Chamillart's papers were published by Gustave Esnault, Michel Chamillart, contrôleur général et secrétaire d'état de la guerre, correspondance et papiers inédits (2 vols, Paris, 1885); and by A de Boislisle in vol. 2 of his Correspondance des controleurs généraux (1883).

== Personal life ==
Married Elisabeth Le Rebours and had issue;

Marie Thérèse (1685-1716)

Michel, married Marie Francoise de Rochechouart Mortemart, daughter of Louis III, duc de Mortemart and Marie Anne Colbert. Had issue among them Marie Elisabeth (1713- 1788)

Marie Elisabeth married Daniel Marie-Anne de Talleyrand-Périgord. Had issue among them the father of the statesman Charles Maurice de Talleyrand-Périgord.

Preceded by Louis François Marie Le Tellier	Secretary of State for War; 8 January 1701 – 9 June 1709	Succeeded by Daniel Voysin de la Noiraye
