= National Gendarmerie Museum =

Coordinates: 48°32′44″N 2°39′11″E

- Musée de la Gendarmerie nationale
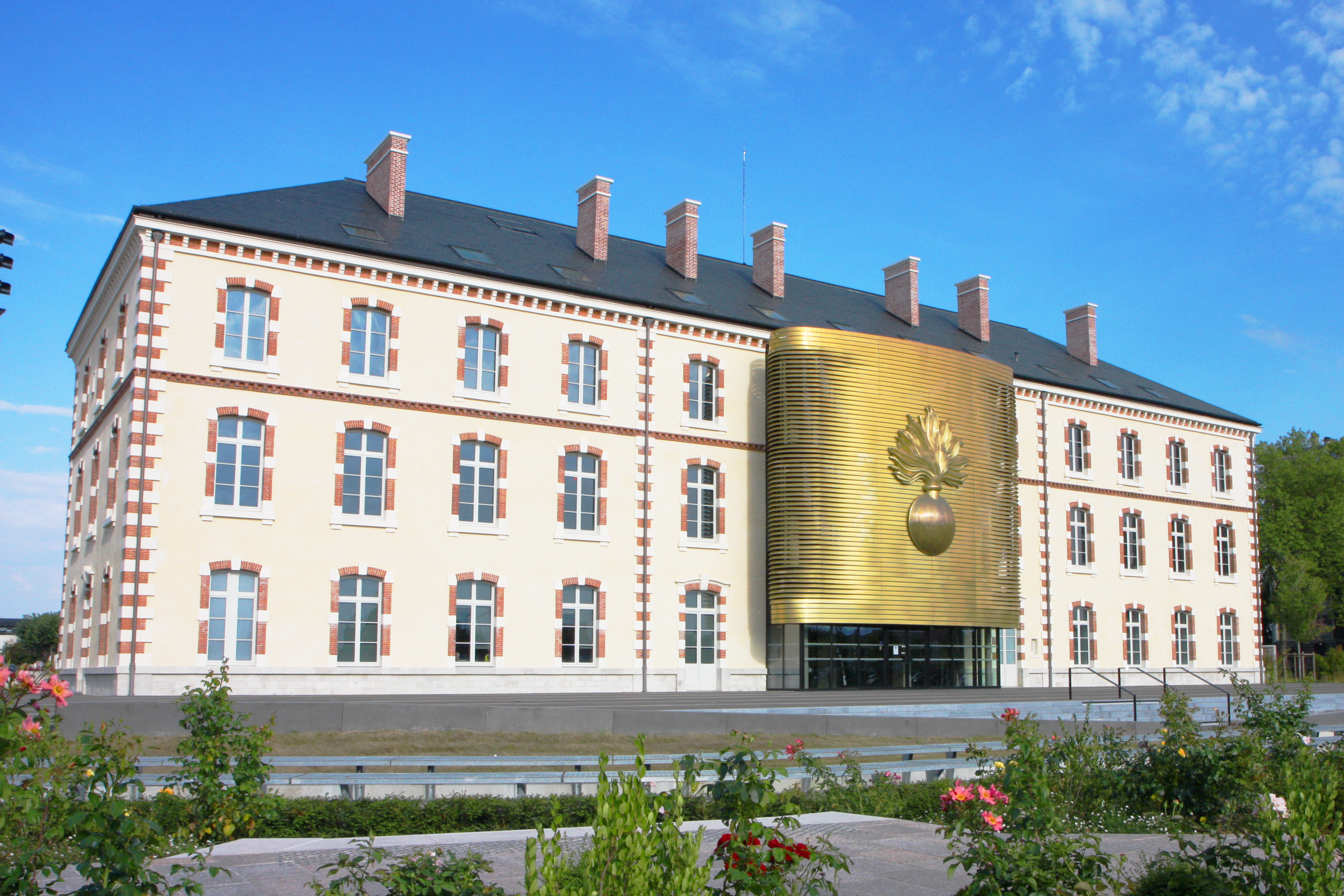
- Established: 1946
- Location: Melun, France
- Type: National
- Accreditation: Musée de France (2011)
- Key holdings: Over 30,000 objects, documents, and photographs
- Collections: History of the National Gendarmerie

The National Gendarmerie Museum (French: Musée de la Gendarmerie nationale) is a museum on the history of France's National Gendarmerie. It is sited at 1-3 Rue Émile-Leclerc in the town of Melun.

It first opened in 1946 but has since been repeatedly extended. Thanks to a protocol signed in 2005 between the Minister of Defence, the communauté d'agglomération Melun Val de Seine and the town of Melun, it closed between 2007 and 2015 for a complete refurbishment and redisplay in a building near the Gendarmerie's officer-training establishment.

It has over 30,000 objects, documents and photographs, including over 1,000 photographs. 2000 of these objects, documents and photographs are displayed over 1200 square metres of permanent display space. There is also a 200 square metre temporary exhibitions space, a 135 square metre reading room, a conference room and education spaces. The Museum was made a 'Musée de France' by France's haut conseil des musées on 14 January 2011.
