= Daniel Voysin de la Noiraye =

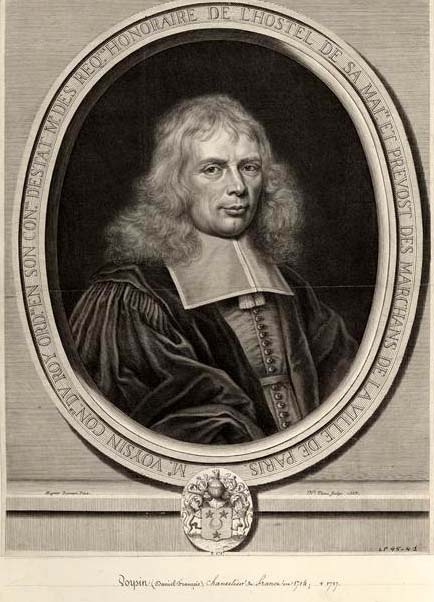
Pitau le jeune - Voysin de la Noiraye

Daniel Voysin de La Noiraye, seigneur du Mesnil-Voysin, de Bouray, du Plessis, de La Noraye, de Ionville et de Lardy (French: [danjɛl vwazɛ̃ də la nwaʁɛ]; 1655–1717) was a French nobleman and politician.
He was greffier of the ordre du Saint-Esprit, chancellor of France from 2 July 1714 to 2 February 1717 and Secretary of State for War from 9 June 1709 to 14 September 1715 in the government of Louis XIV.

== Life ==
He was the son of Jean-Baptiste Voysin, seigneur de la Noiraye (†1672) and of Madeleine Guillard (c. 1629–1700). In 1683 he married Charlotte Trudaine (1664–1714) - the couple had 4 children:

- Madeleine Charlotte (c. 1686–1729)
- Marie Madeleine (1690–1722)
- Charlotte (c. 1692–1723)
- Marie

He served as maître des requêtes and was made intendant of Hainaut in 1688 (a county ceded to France by the Treaty of the Pyrenees and which later became the département du Nord). In 1694, he was made conseiller d'État de senestre and was put in charge of the school for the daughters of Saint-Cyr which Madame de Maintenon had founded. He became director in 1701. In 1714, he was made chancellor of France and garde des Sceaux, replacing Pontchartrain, who had fallen into disgrace.

Preceded by Michel Chamillart	Secretary of State for War; 1709–1715	Succeeded by Claude Louis Hector de Villars
Preceded by Louis Phélypeaux de Pontchartrain	Chancellor of France; 1714–1717	Succeeded by Henri François d'Aguesseau
