= Claude le Blanc =

French royal official (1669–1728)

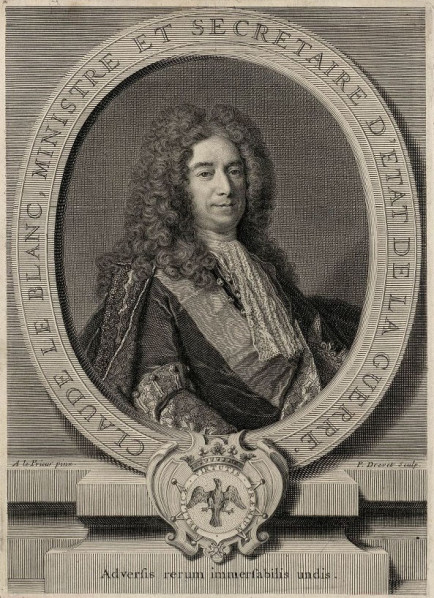
- Claude Le Blanc, by Pierre Drevet the Younger

Secretary of State for War
- In office 24 September 1718 – 1 July 1723
- Monarchs: Louis XV, Régence
- Preceded by: Joseph Fleuriau d'Armenonville
- Succeeded by: François Victor Le Tonnelier de Breteuil
- In office 16 June 1726 – 19 May 1728
- Monarch: Louis XV
- Preceded by: François Victor Le Tonnelier de Breteuil
- Succeeded by: Nicolas Prosper Bauyn d'Angervilliers

Personal details
- Born: 1 December 1669 Rouen, Province of Normandy, Kingdom of France
- Died: 19 May 1728 (aged 59) Palace of Versailles, Versailles, Kingdom of France

Claude Le Blanc (1669 – 19 May 1728) was a French royal official of the ancien regime. He was twice secretary of state for war.

== Early life and family ==
He was born in 1669 to a former intendant of Normandy, Louis le Blanc, and his wife Suzanne Bazin de Bezons. He had a brother, Cesar, who later served as bishop of Avranches, and another brother, Denis Alexandre, who became bishop of Sarlat.

== Political career ==
He became councilor to the parlement of Metz in 1696, maître des requêtes in 1697, and intendant of the Auvergne in 1704 and of Dunkerque and Ypres in 1706. He served as the intendant of Maritime Flanders (Westhoek) from 1708–1716. Appreciated by cardinal André-Hercule de Fleury, his main achievement was the extension of the attributions of the gendarmerie in 1720, which he structured as a maréchaussée, with police duties throughout France.

Le Blanc first became Secretary of State for War in 1718, during the Régence. During this time, he was part of a cabal centered around the Duke of Chartres, son of the regent (Philippe II, Duke of Orléans); along with Charles Louis Auguste Fouquet, duc de Belle-Isle, he became a confidante of Guillaume Dubois during the Cellamare conspiracy.

His first term as secretary ended in disgrace, exile, and imprisonment. He fell from grace due to the machinations of the Marquise de Prie, whose mother was Le Blanc's mistress. He was deposed from his position in 1723 and exiled to Brie, but after the death of the regent later that year, he became a casualty of the infighting between the Condean and Orleanist factions at court. He was accused of murder and imprisoned in the Bastille in March 1724, along with some of his allies, including Jean Moreau de Séchelles. After the dismissal of the Duke of Bourbon as prime minister in 1726, Le Blanc was not only released, but returned to his previous position for a second term as Secretary of State for War. He remained in this position until his death at Versailles in 1728.

== The Louisiana colony ==
When prospects for the French Louisiana colony were high, Le Blanc joined with Belle-Isle to purchase a land grant in the colony. He sponsored Dumont de Montigny, to whom he had family connections, as a lieutenant and engineer to develop the land grant, though he may have regretted the choice–Dumont quarreled with both Governor Bienville and his superior Pierre Le Blond de La Tour. A series of letters from both Le Blond and Dumont to Le Blanc, each denouncing the other, led Le Blanc to reply back that they "complain well of one another."

== Personal life ==
Le Blanc married Madeleine Petit de Passy, the daughter of the president of the parlement of Metz. They had a daughter, Louise-Madeleine Le Blanc, who married Claude-Constant-Esprit Jouvenel de Harville des Ursins.

He was one of the signatories on the wedding contract of Francois Poisson and Louise-Madeleine de la Motte, the parents of Jeanne-Antoinette Poisson, later known as Madame de Pompadour. The young bride shortly thereafter became the mistress of Le Blanc, and later of his brother the bishop of Avranches. He was the subject of a portrait by the celebrated engraver Pierre Drevet the Younger.

Political offices
Preceded by Daniel Voysin de la Noiraye	Secretary of State for War; 24 September 1718 – 1 July 1723	Succeeded by François Victor Le Tonnelier de Breteuil
Preceded by François Victor Le Tonnelier de Breteuil	Secretary of State for War; 16 June 1726 – 19 May 1728	Succeeded by Nicolas Prosper Bauyn d'Angervilliers
