= Støvlet-Cathrine =

Danish courtesan

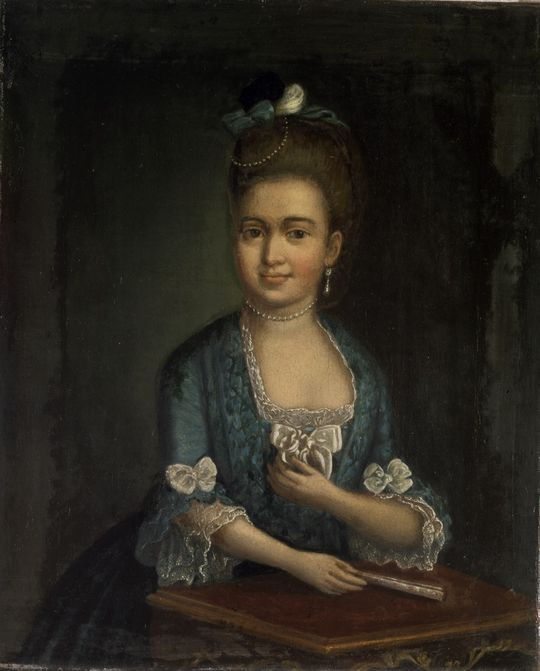
Støvlet-Cathrine.

Anne Cathrine Benthagen, known in history by her nickname Støvlet-Cathrine (b. Copenhagen, c. 1745 – d. Plön, Holstein, 1805), was a Danish prostitute, one of the best known courtesans in Copenhagen in the 1760s and the official royal mistress of King Christian VII of Denmark.

== Biography ==
Støvlet-Cathrine is believed to have been the illegitimate child of her godfather, Prince Georg Ludwig of Brunswick-Bevern (1721–1747), and Anna Marie Schrøder (d. 1771, married to one of Prince Georg Ludwig's guards). She was raised in the home of an officer of her godfather as a foster child, with an allowance given to her by the prince for her upkeep. The allowance left to her by her father eventually dried out, and she returned to her mother, in 1753.

Her mother was married to the soldier Johan Ernst Benthagen, and Cathrine took his last name. Her mother manufactured boots, which earned the girl the nickname Støvlet-Cathrine (literally "Boots-Catherine"). She was described as a beautiful, tall woman with a feminine figure and a dark complexion: her mother was believed to have been of African origin. As a person, she was described as confident, strong-willed and witty.

Cathrine employed herself with prostitution early in life. Initially, having a good voice and a fine figure, she enlisted at the theater as a dancer and actress, and continued to be officially listed as such. In reality, however, she hardly started her stage career before she left it to be kept as a mistress by the British ambassador, during which she was called "Mylady". After the British diplomat left Denmark, she was kept by the Austrian ambassador.

=== Relationship with the king ===
In 1767, Støvlet-Cathrine became the mistress of King Christian VII. That same year, there had been plans at court to introduce the king with Birgitte Sofie Gabel as an official mistress, but it had not succeeded. Støvlet-Cathrine, however, appeared with him at the masked balls of the court theatre, visited the brothels with him and his companions, and was seen playing cards with him at court. She is believed to have influenced him in the dismissal of the cabinet secretary Reverdil. Their relationship was soon seen as a security risk, and Queen Dowager Juliana Maria of Brunswick-Wolfenbüttel disliked her influence over the king. It was considered scandalous that the king took her to court. He seemed to be in love with her, and called her the "Mistress of the Universe".

=== Later life ===
In early January 1768, she was arrested and taken to prison in Hamburg until she was moved to prison in Neumünster in Holstein, where she was treated better. She was under observation in her exile, as there was a fear that she would find a way to reunite with the king. During Christian's European trip in 1768–69, he tried unsuccessfully to see her. In 1769, there were unsuccessful plans at court to replace her with Birgitte Sofie Gabel.

In 1770, she was given a pension of 500 Rigsdaler a year. It is known that she sent the king a letter after the fall of Struensee in 1772, in which she wished him the best and explained that she had written several times before, but assumed that Struensee had intercepted her letters.

Cathrine married lawyer Conrad Ditlev Maës, (1748–1813) in 1770, then divorced him and married musician Hans Hinrich Schweder (1760–1813) in 1785.
