= Siege of Tortosa (1708) =

Coordinates: 40.8128°N 0.5233°E

The siege of Tortosa was a siege of the city of Tortosa (then in the Principality of Catalonia) from 12 June to 8 July 1708 during the War of the Spanish Succession. It pitched a Franco-Spanish force of 28,000 under the Duke of Orleans and Antoni de Villarroel against a combined Catalan and British force of 5,140 infantry and 70 cavalry under Ignasi Minguella, Francesc Montagut and general Jones. It ended in the Franco-Spanish force conclusively taking the town and as a result ending the occupation of Valencia.
