= Claude III de l'Aubespine =

French diplomat

Claude III de l’Aubespine, seigneur de Hauterive, baron of Châteauneuf-sur-Loire (1544 – 11 September 1570) was a French diplomat, and Secretary of State. His father, Claude II de l'Aubespine was a key negotiator in the treaty of Cateau-Cambrésis (1559).

== Life ==
From the L'Aubespine family of merchants and lawyers in the upper Loire valley in Burgundy, he was the brother of Sébastien de L'Aubespine. His brother-in-law was Jacques Bourdin, seigneur de Villeines, and uncle was Jean de Morvilliers. His son-in-law was Nicolas de Neufville, seigneur de Villeroy. He married Marie Clutin d'Oisel, a daughter of Henri Cleutin.

== Sources ==
Political offices
Preceded by Jacques Bourdin	Secretary of State for Foreign Affairs; 1567–1570	Succeeded by Claude Pinart
