= Vertamboz =

- Commune
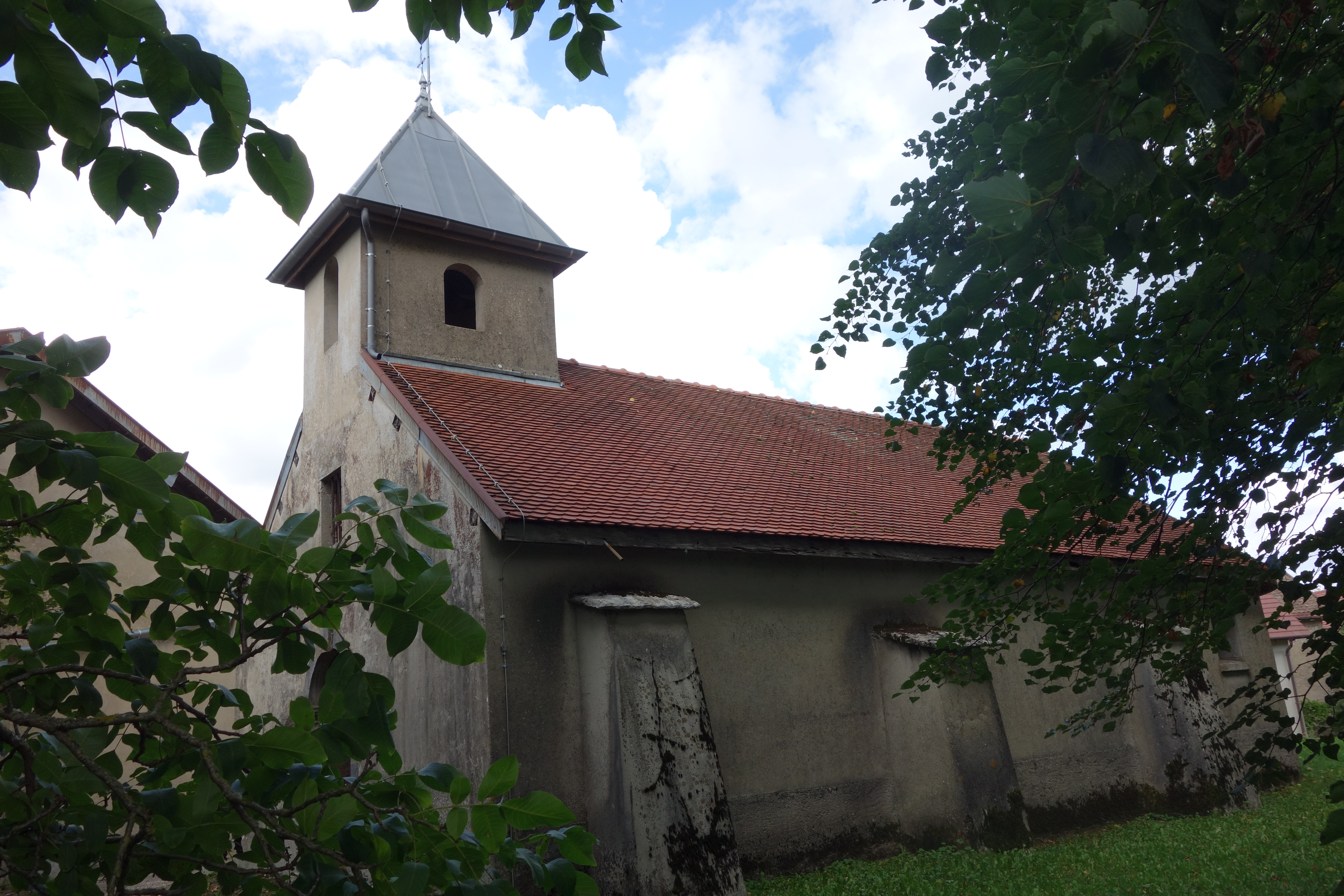
- The chapel in Vertamboz
- Location of Vertamboz
- Location within France Location within Bourgogne-Franche-Comté
- Coordinates: 46°35′48″N 5°44′32″E
- Country: France
- Region: Bourgogne-Franche-Comté
- Department: Jura
- Arrondissement: Lons-le-Saunier
- Canton: Saint-Laurent-en-Grandvaux

Government
  - Mayor (2020–2026): Christiane Dufour
- Area^{1}: 6.66 km^{2} (2.57 sq mi)
- Highest elevation: 615 m (2,018 ft)
- Lowest elevation: 439 m (1,440 ft)
- Population (2023): 83
  - Density: 12/km^{2} (32/sq mi)
- Time zone: UTC+01:00 (CET)
  - Summer (DST): UTC+02:00 (CEST)
- INSEE/Postal code: 39556 /39130
- ^{1} French Land Register data, which excludes lakes, ponds, glaciers > 1 km^{2} (0.386 sq mi or 247 acres) and river estuaries.

Vertamboz (French pronunciation: [vɛʁtɑ̃bo]) is a commune in the Jura department in the Bourgogne-Franche-Comté region in eastern France.

== Population ==
Historical population
Year	Pop.	±% p.a.
1968	121	—
1975	94	−3.54%
1982	90	−0.62%
1990	84	−0.86%
1999	68	−2.32%
2007	89	+3.42%
2012	90	+0.22%
2017	94	+0.87%
2023	83	−2.05%
Source: INSEE

== See also ==
- Communes of the Jura department
