= Hôtel de Ville, Maisons-Laffitte =

Town hall in Maisons-Laffitte, France

Hôtel de Ville
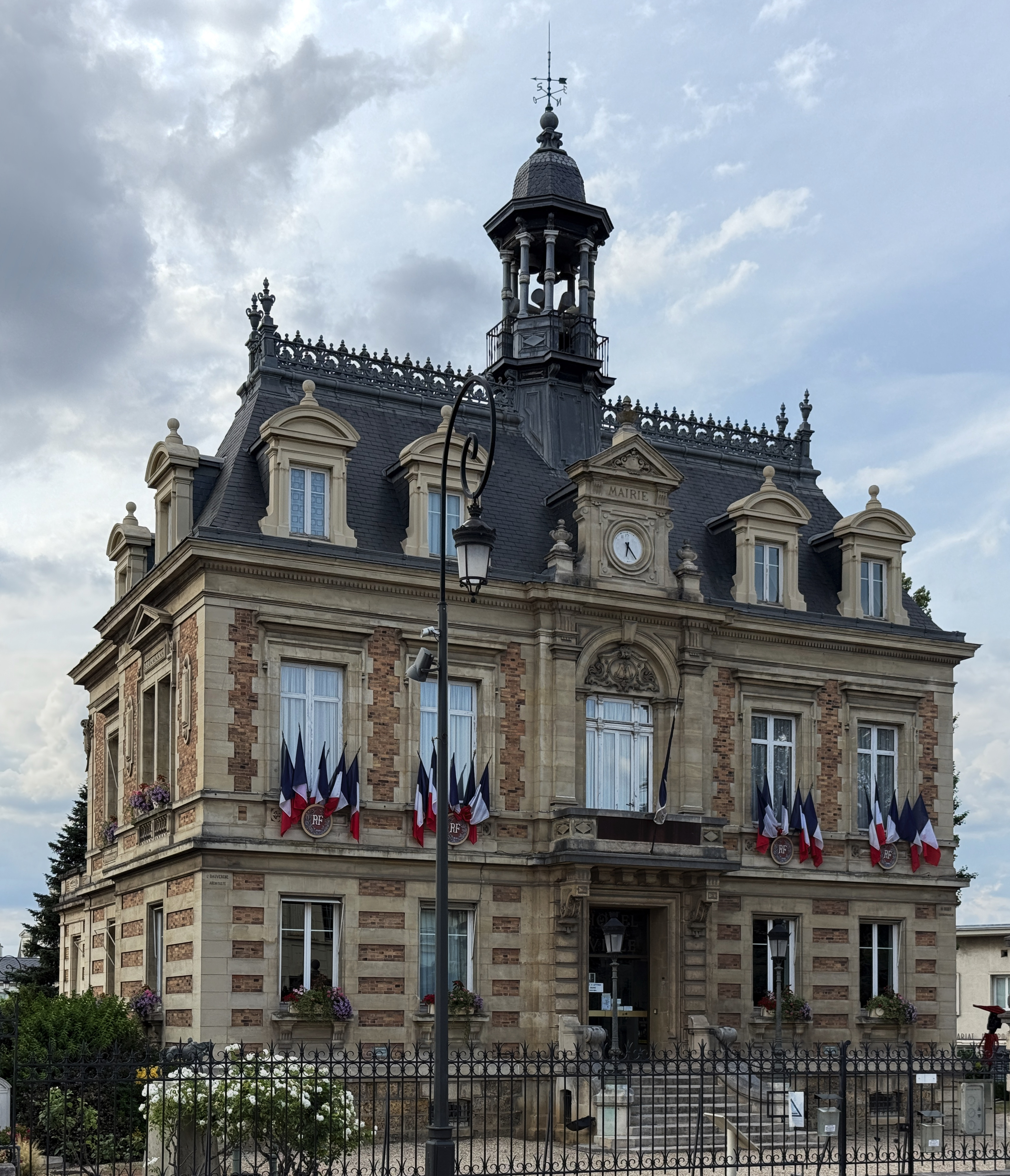
- The main frontage of the Hôtel de Ville in July 2025
- Interactive map of the Hôtel de Ville area

General information
- Type: City hall
- Architectural style: French Baroque style
- Location: Maisons-Laffitte, France
- Coordinates: 48.9461°N 2.1449°E
- Completed: 1891

Design and construction
- Architect: Louis Dauvergne

The Hôtel de Ville (French pronunciation: [otɛl də vil], City Hall) is a municipal building in Maisons-Laffitte, Yvelines, in the northwestern suburbs of Paris, standing on Avenue de Longueil.

== History ==
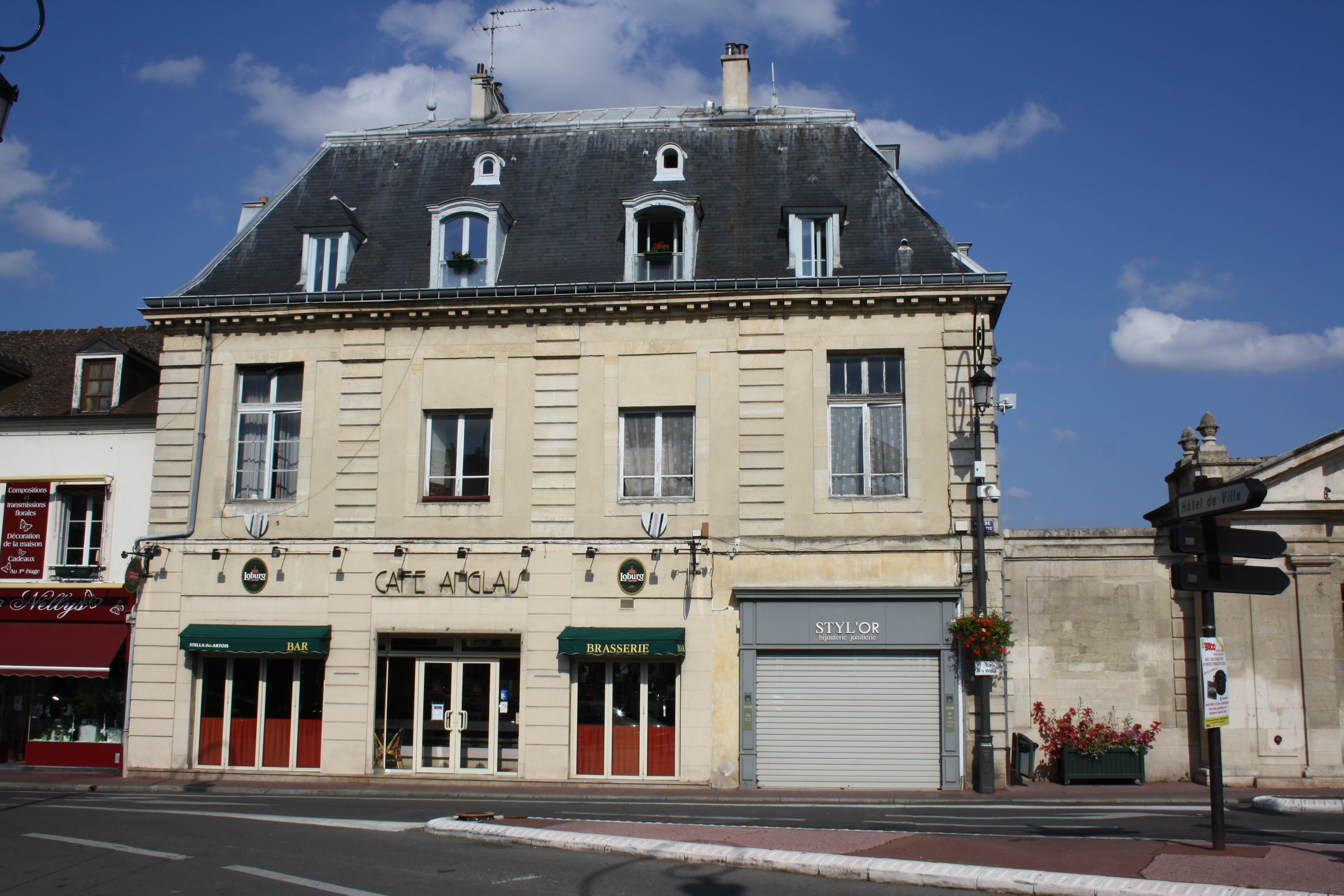
The old town hall

Following the French Revolution, the new town council initially met at the home of the mayor at the time. This arrangement continued until the mid-1860s, when the council led by the mayor, Denis-Charles Duverdy, decided to acquire a building for municipal use. The building they selected was a pavilion on Rue de la Muette, just to the left of the southwestern entrance to the park. The building was designed by François Mansart in the neoclassical style, built in ashlar stone and was completed in the mid-17th century. The building had served as the Hôtel de l'Aigle d'Or (House of the Golden Eagle) before becoming the town hall in 1868. The design involved a symmetrical main frontage of four bays facing onto Rue de la Muette. The doorway was originally in the right-hand bay and the building was fenestrated by casement windows on both floors.

In the mid-1880s, following significant population growth, the council decided to commission a dedicated town hall. The project initially faced strong opposition on account of the high projected cost. The site they eventually selected was at the opposite end of Avenue de Longueil to the old town hall, close to Maisons-Laffitte station, which had opened as part of the Paris–Le Havre railway in 1843. The new building was designed by Louis Dauvergne in the French Baroque style, built in red brick with stone dressings and was officially opened by the mayor, Marius Trussy, in July 1891.

The design involved a symmetrical main frontage of five bays facing onto Avenue de Longueil. The central bay, which was slightly projected forward, featured a square-headed doorway on the ground floor, and a round-headed French door with a carving in the tympanum and a balcony on the first floor. The French door was flanked by Doric order pilasters supporting an entablature, a modillioned cornice and a clock above the central bay. The other bays were fenestrated by casement windows on the ground and first floors and by dormer windows at attic level. Behind the clock, there was an octagonal lantern with a dome and a weather vane. Internally, the principal room was the Salle du Conseil (council chamber).

Following the liberation of the town by the advancing allied troops on 25 August 1944, during the Second World War, the president of the local Liberation Committee, Gilbert Durif, spoke a large crowd from the steps of the building. After a bust of Marianne was recovered from its hiding place and restored to its rightful place in town hall, the crowd sang La Marseillaise.
