= Juliette Bruno-Ruby =

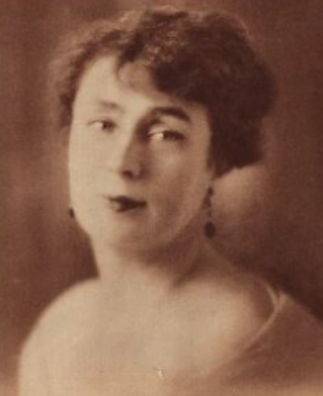
- Born: Juliette Henriette Marie Leclère; 13 January 1878
- Died: 22 July 1956 (aged 78)
- Occupations: Novelist; film director
- Spouse: Henri Bucquet (m. 1896; div. 1909) Jean Vignaud (m. 1913)
- Awards: Officier de l'Instruction publique 1913

Juliette Bruno-Ruby was born as Juliette Henriette Marie Leclère on 13 January 1878 in Versailles and died on 22 July 1956 in Maisons-Laffitte. She was a novelist and film director.

== Biography ==
She was born to Adolphe Leclère, a recipient of the Legion of Honour. Juliette Leclère was married to Henri Bucquet, an attorney, in April 1896, before divorcing him in 1909. Later, in April 1913, she remarried, to Jean Vignaud, who she met in the Prix Excelsior literary contest in February 1912.

Her first novel, Madame Cotte, was published in 1913, where she first took the name pen-name of Bruno-Ruby. In 1923 she began work on her film La Caban d'amour, which released in Paris in August of the next year. Three years later, she directed the film La Bonne Hôtesse.

== Selected works ==
Novels
| Year | Novel |
|---|---|
| 1913 | Madame Cotte |
| 1919 | L'Exemple de l'abbé Jouve |
| 1921 | Celui qui supprima la mort |
| 1930 | Sig, l'aventurier |
| 1931 | La Louve |
| 1934 | Dix sur la route |
| 1948 | Le Tigre bleu |

== Filmography ==
Film
| Year | Film |
|---|---|
| 1924 | La Caban d'amour |
| 1927 | A la Bonne Hôtesse / La Bonne Hôtesse |

Unfinished
| Year | Film |
|---|---|
| 1926 | La Caravane hantée |

== Awards and nominations ==
Officier de l'Instruction publique (17 March 1913)
