= Maisons-Laffitte =

- Commune
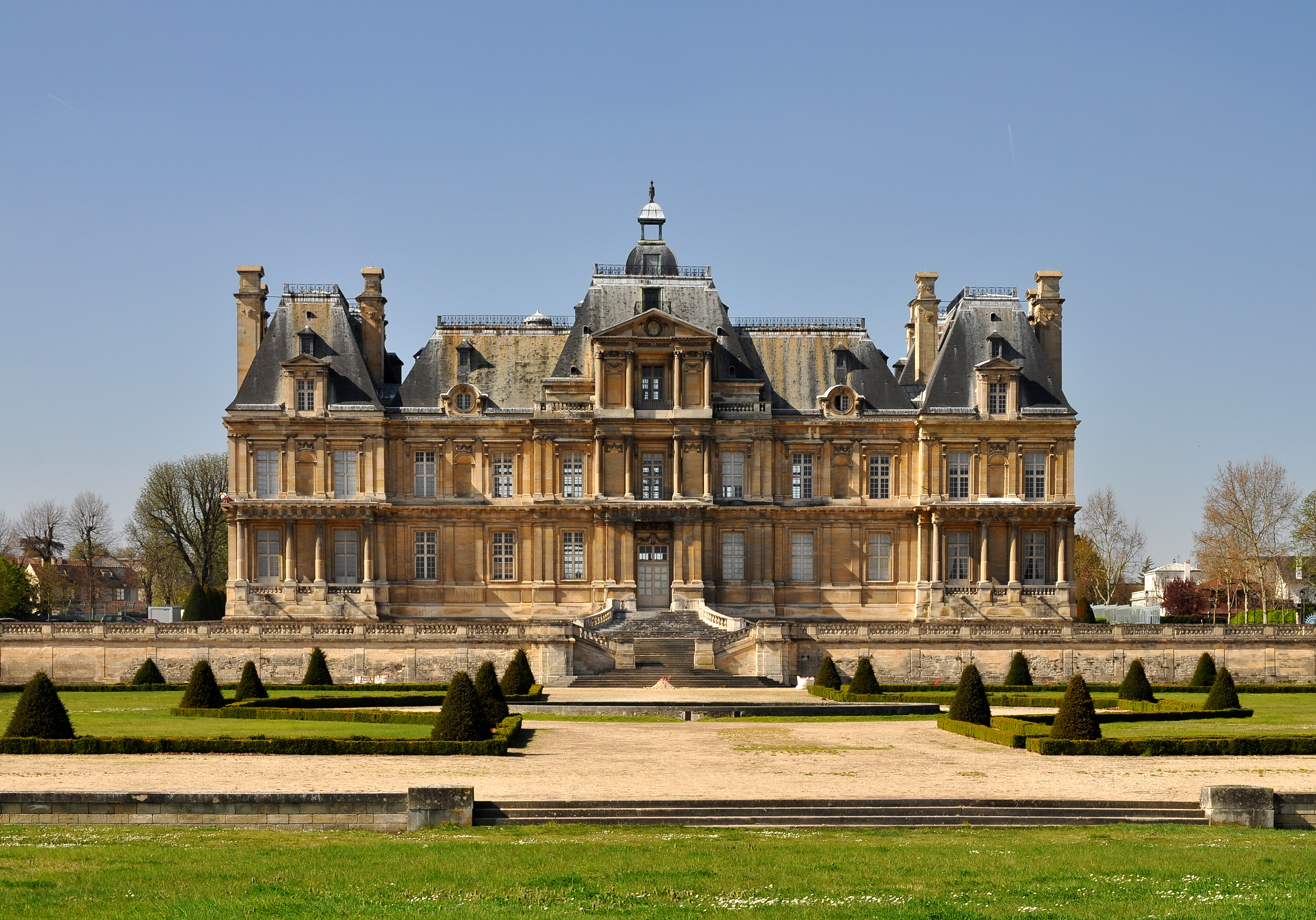
- Château de Maisons-Laffitte

- Coat of arms

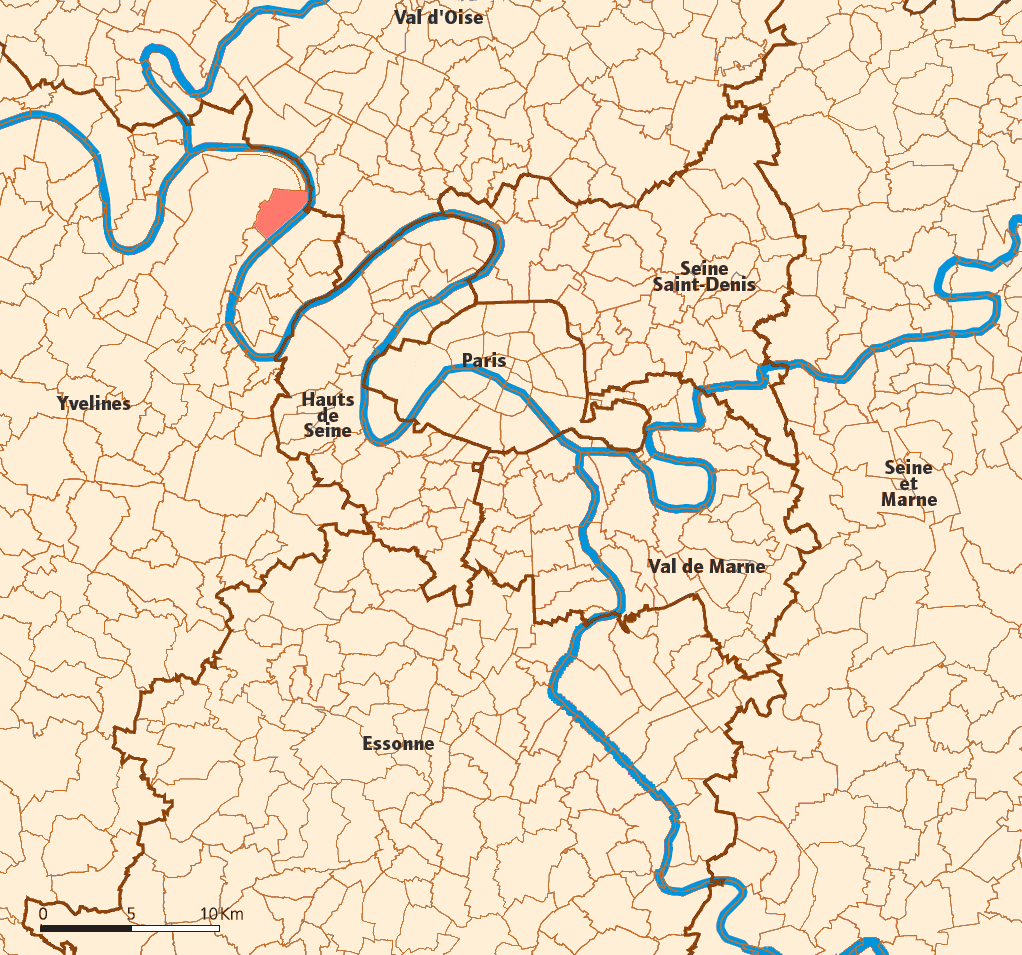
- Location (in red) within Paris inner and outer suburbs
- Location of Maisons-Laffitte
- Location within France Location within Île-de-France (region)
- Coordinates: 48°56′49″N 2°08′44″E
- Country: France
- Region: Île-de-France
- Department: Yvelines
- Arrondissement: Saint-Germain-en-Laye
- Canton: Sartrouville
- Intercommunality: CA Saint Germain Boucles Seine

Government
  - Mayor (2020–2026): Jacques Myard (LR)
- Area^{1}: 6.75 km^{2} (2.61 sq mi)
- Elevation: 38 m (125 ft)
- Highest elevation: 57 m (187 ft)
- Lowest elevation: 22 m (72 ft)
- Population (2023): 23,093
  - Density: 3,420/km^{2} (8,860/sq mi)
- Time zone: UTC+01:00 (CET)
  - Summer (DST): UTC+02:00 (CEST)
- INSEE/Postal code: 78358 /78600
- ^{1} French Land Register data, which excludes lakes, ponds, glaciers > 1 km^{2} (0.386 sq mi or 247 acres) and river estuaries.

Maisons-Laffitte (French pronunciation: [mɛzɔ̃ lafit]) is a commune in the Yvelines department in the northern Île-de-France region of France. It is a part of the affluent outer suburbs of northwestern Paris, 18.2 km (11.3 mi) from its centre.

Maisons-Laffitte is famous for the Château de Maisons-Laffitte, built by architect François Mansart in the 17th century, and its horse racing track, the Maisons-Laffitte Racecourse. Église Saint-Nicolas was built between 1867 and 1872.

== History ==
=== Early Origins (Prehistoric to Roman Era) ===
The area of Maisons-Laffitte has been inhabited since prehistoric times. Archaeological finds suggest the presence of early human activity dating back to the Stone Age. During the Roman period, it was part of the territory of the Parisii tribe and later integrated into the Roman Empire. Its location near the Seine River made it a strategic stop along trade and military routes connecting Lutetia (modern-day Paris) to the northwestern parts of Gaul.

=== Medieval period ===
In the Middle Ages, the area was known as Maisons-sur-Seine. It was primarily rural, made up of forests, farmland, and a small village. The name "Maisons" comes from the Latin mansiones, meaning dwellings or rest stops. The land was under the control of feudal lords and the Church. The village remained relatively quiet and isolated until the 17th century.

=== 17th Century ===
The town began to rise in status when René de Longueil, a wealthy magistrate under Louis XIII and Louis XIV, commissioned the construction of a grand château. Between 1642 and 1650, architect François Mansart designed the Château de Maisons, an architectural masterpiece of classical French design. The château attracted aristocrats, artists, and dignitaries, increasing the prestige of the area.

=== 18th Century ===
In the 18th century, the château was owned by various nobles, including the Count of Artois, who later became King Charles X. The estate was known for hunting, equestrian sports, and aristocratic gatherings. However, during the French Revolution, the château was seized as national property, and much of the aristocratic influence in the town declined.

=== 19th Century ===
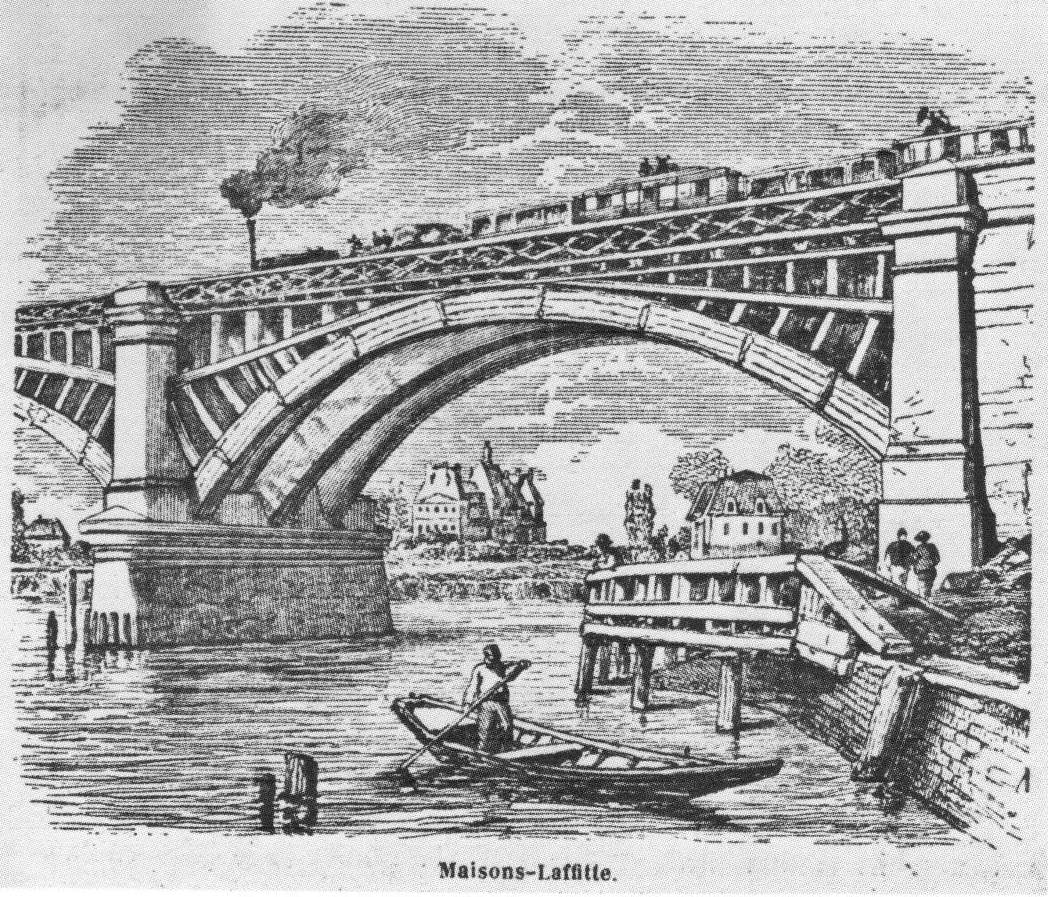
drawing done by Charles-François Daubigny - Maisons-Laffitte

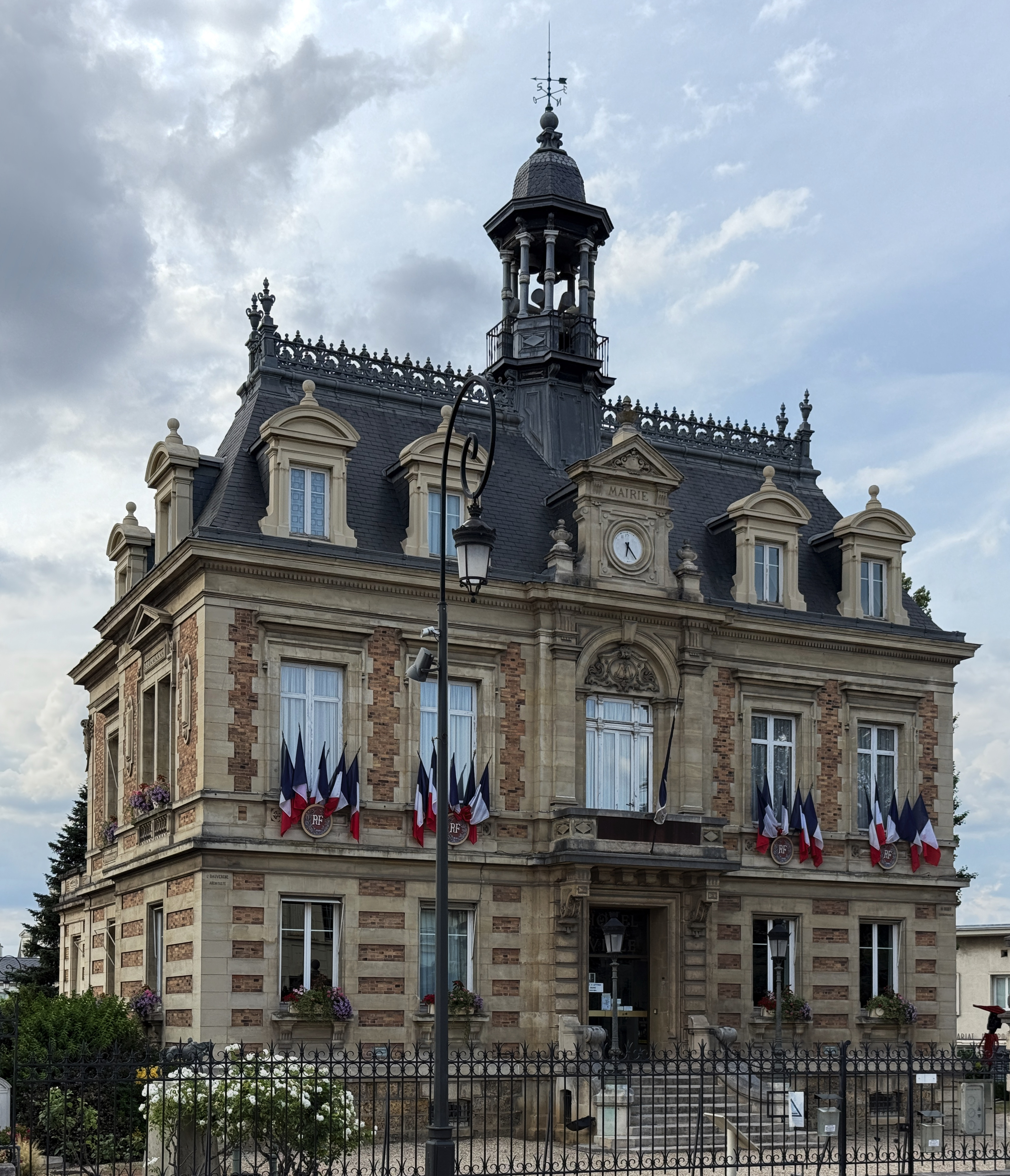
The Hôtel de Ville

In 1818, banker and politician Jacques Laffitte purchased the château and surrounding lands. He developed the area into a luxury suburb of Paris by dividing the land into plots and selling them to wealthy Parisians. In 1882, the town officially changed its name from Maisons-sur-Seine to Maisons-Laffitte in his honor. The arrival of the railway further boosted development by connecting the town to Paris in just 20 minutes. The Hôtel de Ville was completed in 1891.

Maisons-Laffitte became well-known for horse racing after the opening of its racetrack (hippodrome) in 1878. It earned the nickname "Cité du Cheval" (City of the Horse), with stables, training centers, and equestrian culture becoming central to the town's identity.

=== 20th Century ===
==== World War I ====
During World War I (1914–1918), Maisons-Laffitte, like many towns near Paris, was not a battlefield but played an important role in supporting the French war effort. The town hosted military hospitals and convalescence centers for wounded soldiers returning from the front. Several private estates and public buildings were temporarily converted into medical facilities.

The town also saw the mobilization of many of its residents. A significant number of men from Maisons-Laffitte were drafted into the French army, and the local community experienced heavy losses, which are commemorated by a war memorial located in the town center.

In addition to the human cost, daily life in Maisons-Laffitte was marked by rationing, economic strain, and the adaptation of civilian life to the demands of war. Despite its proximity to Paris, the town was spared direct combat but remained on alert during key moments of the war, such as the German advance toward the Marne in 1914.

Maisons-Laffitte continued to support the war effort through various local initiatives, including charity drives, supply donations, and assistance to refugees displaced from the eastern regions of France.

==== World War II ====
During World War II (1939–1945), Maisons-Laffitte, located just northwest of Paris, was occupied by German forces following the Fall of France in June 1940. The town remained under occupation until the Liberation in 1944.

As part of the occupied zone, Maisons-Laffitte experienced the typical hardships of German rule. German troops were stationed in and around the town, and several buildings were requisitioned for military use. Daily life was heavily affected by curfews, food rationing, censorship, and surveillance. The Château de Maisons itself was occupied by German forces and used as a military headquarters or administrative post at various points during the occupation.

The town also saw activity from the French Resistance. Members of the local resistance network operated discreetly, gathering intelligence, distributing clandestine newspapers, and aiding escaped prisoners or downed Allied airmen. These activities carried great risk, and some residents were arrested or deported to concentration camps.

Jewish families living in Maisons-Laffitte were subject to anti-Semitic laws imposed by the Vichy regime and the German authorities. Some were arrested and deported during the large roundups (notably the Vel' d’Hiv roundup in July 1942), and memorials in the town today honor their memory.

In 1944, as Allied forces advanced following the D-Day landings, Maisons-Laffitte was eventually liberated. The German military retreated, and French and Allied forces re-entered the town. Although Maisons-Laffitte was not heavily bombed and escaped major destruction, the scars of war remained in the form of personal loss, repression, and disruption of community life.

After the war, memorial plaques and monuments were erected in Maisons-Laffitte to honor the soldiers, resistance members, and civilians who died or suffered during the conflict. The town actively commemorates these events each year during national remembrance days.

==== Cold War ====
During the Cold War, Maisons-Laffitte became an important cultural and political center for the Russian émigré community in France. After World War II, and especially during the tensions between the West and the Soviet Union, the town became a hub for anti-communist Russian intellectuals, writers, and exiles who had fled the Bolshevik Revolution and Stalinist regime.

In 1950, the Russian-language YMCA Press (Éditions YMCA-Press) relocated its headquarters to Maisons-Laffitte. This publishing house played a critical role in the Cold War ideological struggle, as it printed and distributed censored Russian literary, philosophical, and religious works to be smuggled into the Soviet Union. One of its most famous publications was the works of Alexander Solzhenitsyn, including the Gulag Archipelago.

The YMCA Press operated in collaboration with the Russian Student Christian Movement (RSCM), which also had a base in Maisons-Laffitte. These institutions made the town a center for Russian Orthodox and dissident activity in Western Europe during the Cold War era.

As a result, Maisons-Laffitte became known informally as a "capital of the Russian diaspora". It attracted Russian-speaking writers, priests, artists, and activists who lived in exile, and its legacy in Russian cultural and religious history remains significant to this day.

Although it was not involved in military activities, Maisons-Laffitte played a symbolic and intellectual role in the Cold War through its support of freedom of expression, anti-totalitarianism, and the preservation of Russian culture outside the USSR.

=== 21st Century ===
As of 2025, Maisons-Laffitte is known as a wealthy suburban town that blends historical charm with modern living. It is known for its green spaces, international community, and elegant architecture. The Château de Maisons is now a protected monument and open to the public. The town remains an important center for horse training and racing in France. Maisons-Laffitte has been recognized in rankings of the best places to live in France. According to the 2025 "Villes et Villages où il fait bon vivre" (Towns and Villages Where Life is Good) ranking, Maisons-Laffitte is positioned 243rd nationally out of 34,795 communes. Among communes with populations between 20,000 and 50,000 inhabitants, it ranks 93rd out of 335. Within its department, Yvelines, Maisons-Laffitte holds the 8th position overall and 6th among communes of similar size. Additionally, Maisons-Laffitte has been featured in various publications highlighting desirable places to live in France. For instance, Expat Exchange includes Maisons-Laffitte in its list of the "15 Best Places to Live in France," noting its charming environment, rich history, and vibrant cultural life.

== Expat community ==
Maisons-Laffitte is home to a notable expatriate population, particularly from English-speaking countries such as the United Kingdom, the United States, and Canada, as well as other European nations like Germany, the Netherlands, and Scandinavian countries. As of 2021, around 10.8% of the town's population held foreign citizenship, reflecting its international character.

The town's appeal to expats stems from its environment, residential neighborhoods, and proximity to central Paris (just 20 minutes by RER A or Transilien train). It offers a village-like atmosphere while remaining well-connected to urban amenities.

A key factor in the town's popularity with foreign residents is the presence of international educational institutions in the nearby area, most notably the Lycée International de Saint-Germain-en-Laye and the International School of France, which provides bilingual education in several languages, including English, German, Dutch, Spanish, and others. Many expat families choose to live in Maisons-Laffitte due to its convenient access to these schools.

The town also has an active international community, with only English-speaking services, clubs, associations, and places of worship, like Holy Trinity Church, which regularly has Sunday services in English. Other such services include cultural events, sports activities, and networking opportunities that help new residents integrate into French culture.

== Population ==
Historical population

Year	Pop.	±% p.a.
1793	799	—
1800	711	−1.65%
1806	733	+0.51%
1821	826	+0.80%
1831	916	+1.04%
1836	1,087	+3.48%
1841	1,422	+5.52%
1846	1,405	−0.24%
1851	1,560	+2.12%
1856	1,752	+2.35%
1861	2,175	+4.42%
1866	2,720	+4.57%
1872	3,330	+3.43%
1876	3,247	−0.63%
1881	3,725	+2.78%
1886	4,380	+3.29%
1891	4,744	+1.61%
1896	5,622	+3.45%
1901	6,730	+3.66%

Year	Pop.	±% p.a.
1906	8,149	+3.90%
1911	9,674	+3.49%
1921	10,571	+0.89%
1926	12,026	+2.61%
1931	13,573	+2.45%
1936	13,040	−0.80%
1946	13,074	+0.03%
1954	15,481	+2.13%
1962	19,132	+2.68%
1968	24,223	+4.01%
1975	23,504	−0.43%
1982	22,595	−0.56%
1990	22,173	−0.24%
1999	21,856	−0.16%
2007	22,649	+0.45%
2012	23,215	+0.49%
2017	23,669	+0.39%
2023	23,093	−0.41%

Source: EHESS and INSEE (1968-2023)

== Landmarks ==
=== Landmarks and Monuments ===
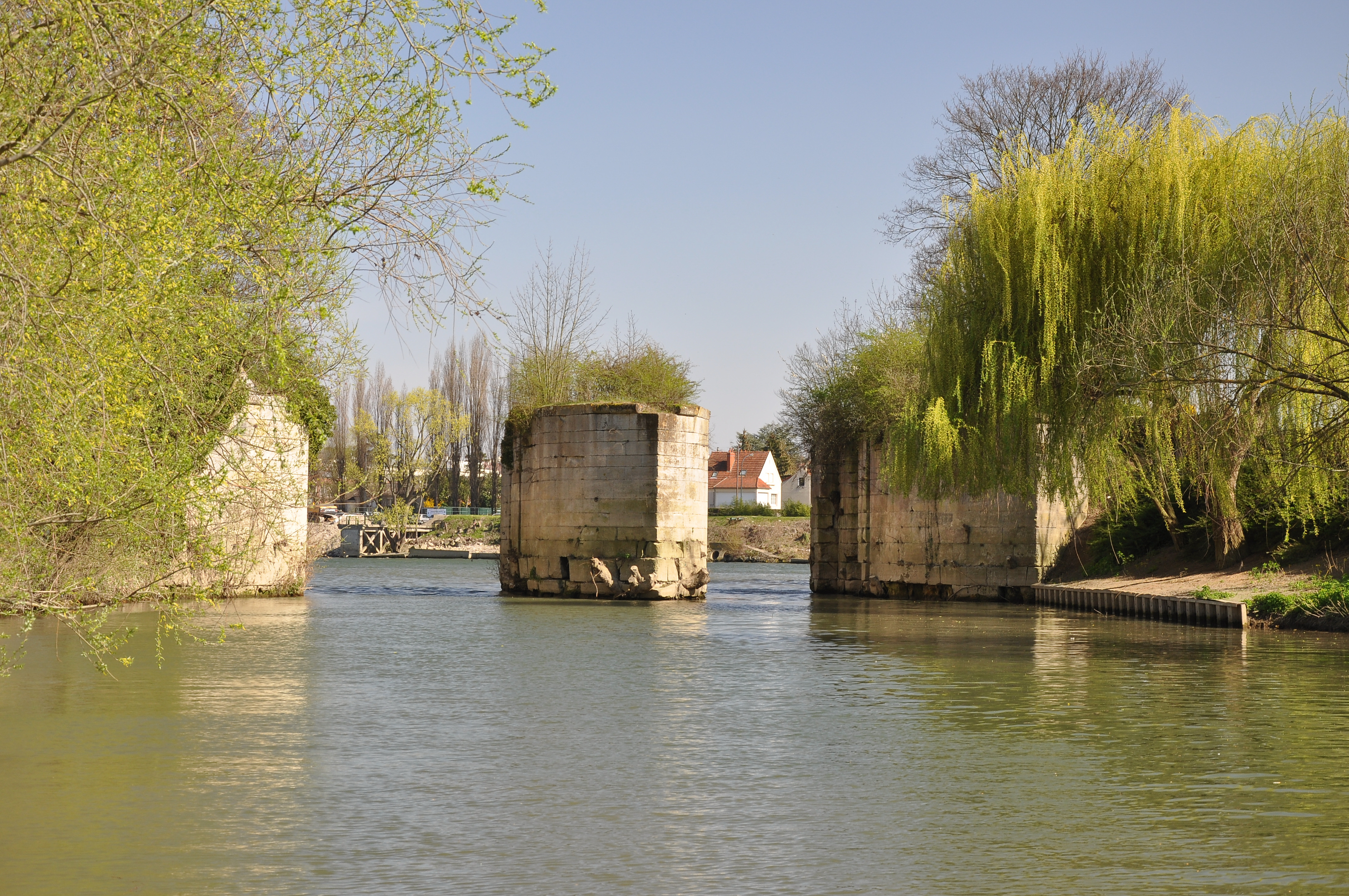
The remains of the old mill on the small branch of the Seine.

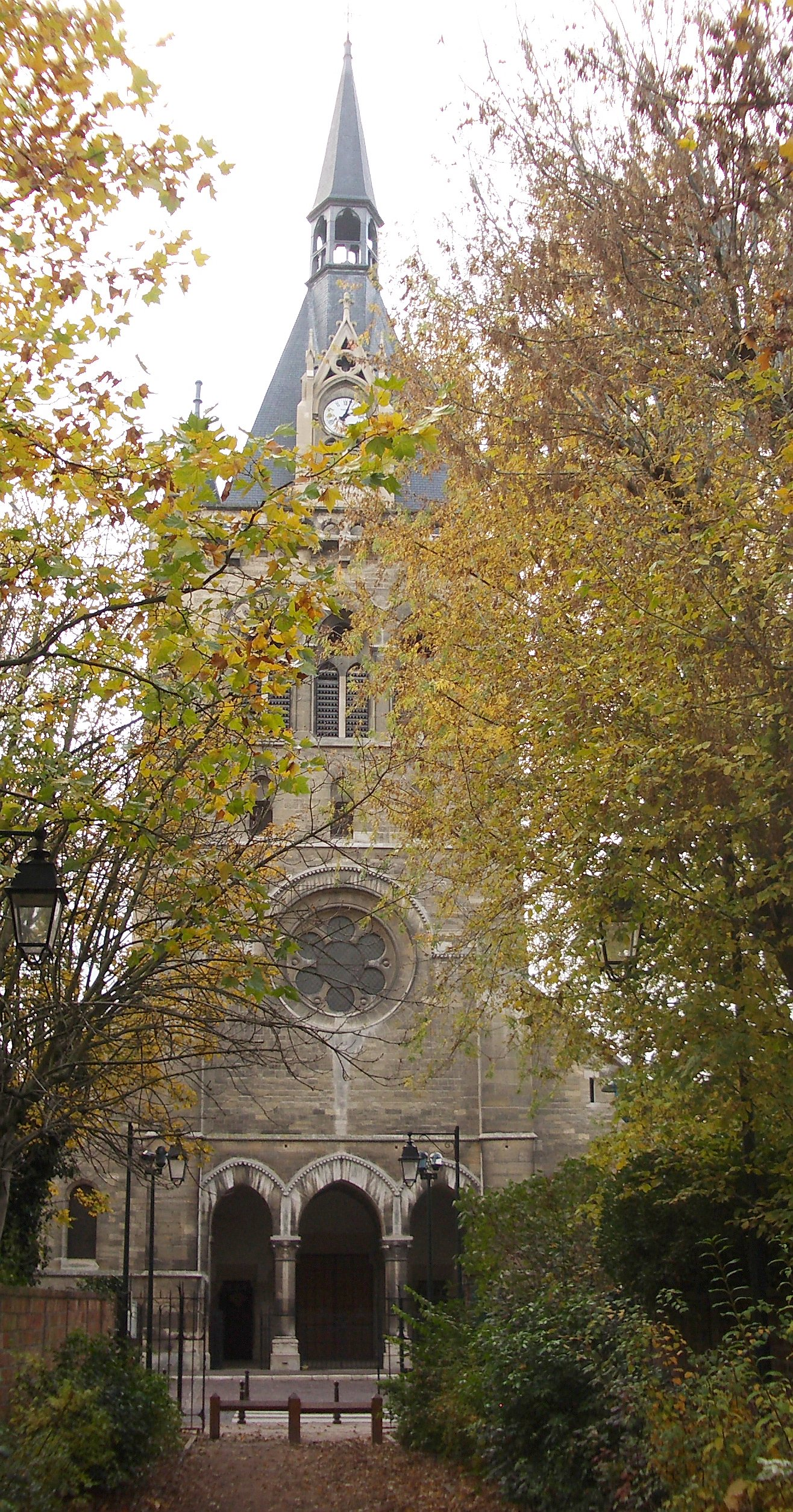
Saint-Nicolas Church, built between 1868 and 1885. The bell tower is equipped with a carillon of eight bells.

- Château de Maisons-Laffitte (1643).
- Contemporary to the château, several pavilions also designed by François Mansart: two at the entrance of the Parc de Maisons-Laffitte, framing the two portes de Maisons-Laffitte, once closed by a gate. Two others a bit further away, heavily altered, on Avenue Eglé. A fifth at Caves du Nord, on Avenue Bourdaloue, extending the Avenue Albine at the other end of the park.
- Saint-Nicolas Church, built in 1872.
- The Chapel of Peace, dating from the XI^{e} et XVI^{e} siècles, decommissioned in 1896, now an exhibition center. The Fontaine de Maisons-Laffitte, located in the village nearby, dating from the 18th century.
- The remains of the Machine des Eaux de Maisons-Laffitte on the small branch of the Seine. It was most likely built by François Mansart at the request of René de Longueil to supply his future Château de Maisons in 1634. Destroyed in 1885, only the three masonry piers on which the machine rested remain today. The structure was listed as a historical monument in 1974.
- Notable Villas
  - At 30 Avenue Pascal: "Pavillon Doulton", created by the English pottery company Royal Doulton for the Exposition Universelle of 1878. After the exposition, the facade was rebuilt in the Parc de Maisons-Laffitte and a house was constructed behind it.
  - At 35 Avenue Belleforière: Villa with a garden from 1923, designed by architects Henri Lecoeur (1867-1951) and Jodart for Mr. and Mrs. Laureys. It is now divided into apartments, and the garden has been subdivided for the construction of several buildings.
  - At 2 Avenue du Général-Leclerc: "Villa Florentine", built in 1905 by architect André Granet (1881-1974) for Mr. Trussy. The decoration was done by Mr. Ledoux.
  - Propriété Juillard
  - Pavillon des Gardes
  - Pavillon, 72 rue de Paris (Maisons-Laffitte)
  - Pavillon, 2 rue de la Muette (Maisons-Laffitte)
  - Pavillon, 24 avenue Eglé (Maisons-Laffitte)
  - Pavillon, 21bis avenue Eglé (Maisons-Laffitte)
  - Propriété, 39 avenue Albine (Maisons-Laffitte)
- Hôtel Royal de Maisons-Laffitte
- Building, 36bis rue de la Muette (Maisons-Laffitte)
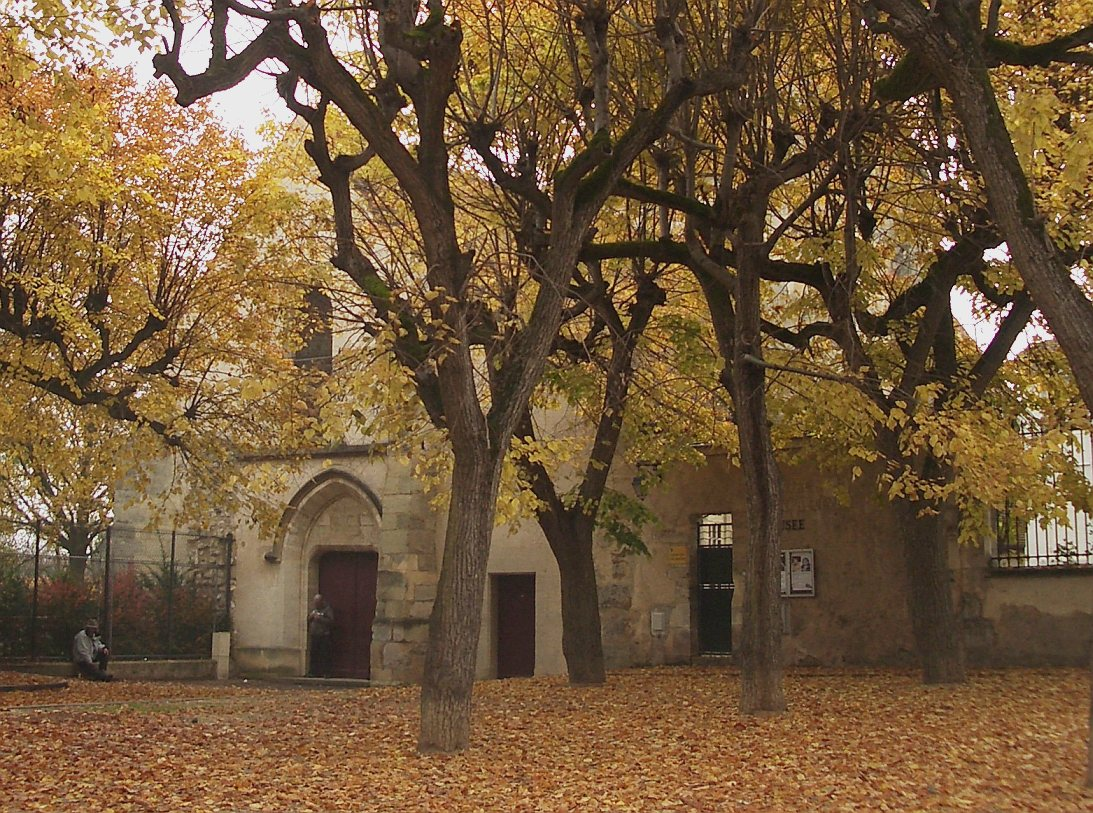
The old church next to the château.

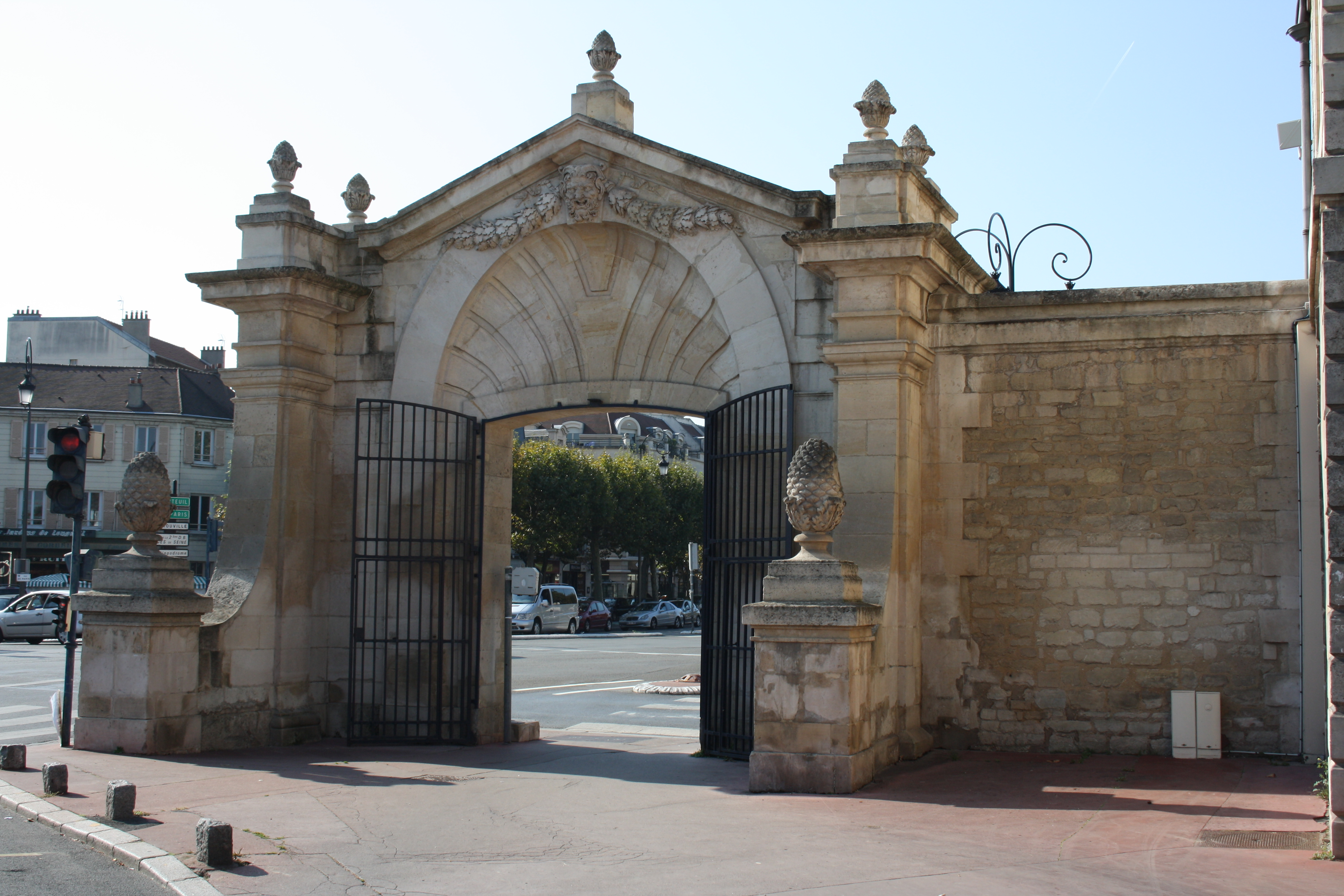
The park gate as seen from the inside.

== Transport ==
=== Transport and Mobility ===
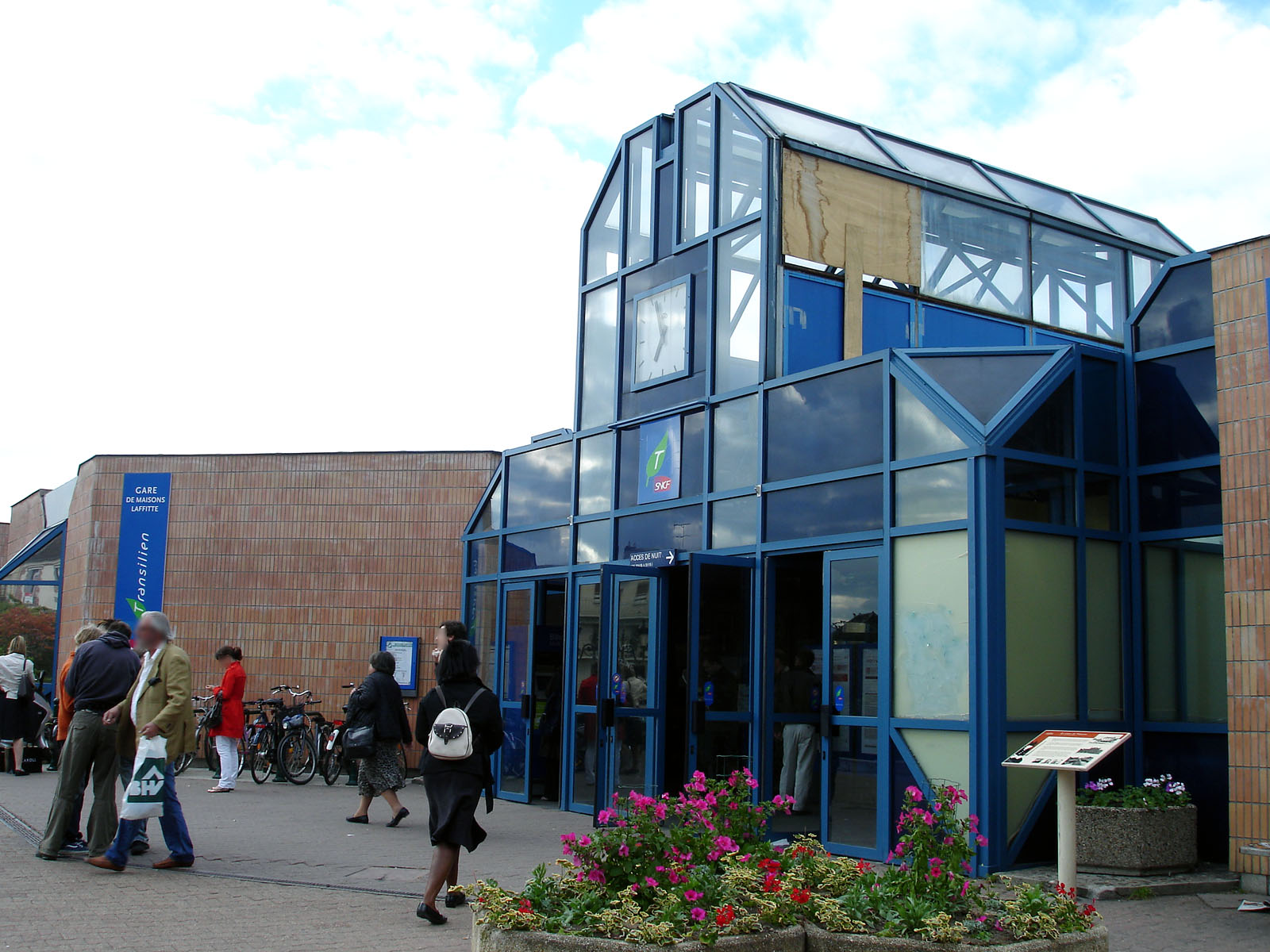
Maisons-Laffitte urban Train Station

The town has its own railway station, the Maisons-Laffitte station, located on the Paris–Le Havre railway, in operation since 1843. The station is served by both the RER A line and the Transilien Line L.

The station is also served by several bus lines from the Argenteuil - Boucles de Seine bus network: lines 2, 6, 12, and 262. At night, it is served by the Noctilien line N152.

- Line 2: Maisons-Laffitte station <> Saint-Germain-en-Laye station
- Line 6: Maisons-Laffitte station <> Le Mesnil-le-Roi
- Line 12: Maisons-Laffitte station <> Urban Circuit
- Line 262: Maisons-Laffitte station <> Pont de Bezons
- Line N152: Cergy-le-Haut station <> Paris Saint-Lazare

== Notable residents ==
- Pape-Philippe Amagou, basketball player
- Grégory Baugé, cyclist
- Eugène Louis Bouvier, zoologist
- Jean Cocteau, writer, filmmaker, and artist
- Jerzy Giedroyc, founder and editor of a leading Polish-émigré literary-political journal, Kultura
- Philippe Jaroussky, opera singer
- Coralie Lassource, handball player
- René Le Roy (1898–1985), classical flutist
- Odd Nerdrum, painter
- Randy de Puniet, motorcycle racer
- Anne Queffélec, pianist
- Yvonne Rokseth, composer and musicologist
- Emma Watson (until the age of five), actress
- James Winkfield, jockey, horse trainer
- Ghislaine Maxwell, British socialite known for her association with Jeffrey Epstein
- Nicolas Canteloup, a French impressionist/comedian.

== Education ==
Public schools:

- Six preschools/nurseries (maternelles): Bois-Bonnet, Clos-Lainé, Cocteau, Colbert, La Renarde, Montebello
- Four elementary schools: Jehan Alain/André Ledreux, Colbert, Le Prieuré, Mansart
- Junior high schools (collèges): Jean Cocteau and Collège Le Prieuré
- Senior high schools/sixth-form colleges: Lycée Évariste Galois (Sartrouville) and Lycée Les Pierres Vives (Carrières sur Seine)

Private schools:

- International School of France / L'Ermitage (preschool to senior high)
- Sainte-Marie (preschool and elementary)
- Ecole Montessori Internationale

== Twin towns – sister cities ==
Since 2023, Maisons-Laffitte is twinned with Arkadag city, Turkmenistan.

Maisons-Laffitte is also twinned with Newmarket, in the United Kingdom.

== See also ==
- Communes of the Yvelines department
