= Château de Maisons =

French Baroque château northwest of Paris

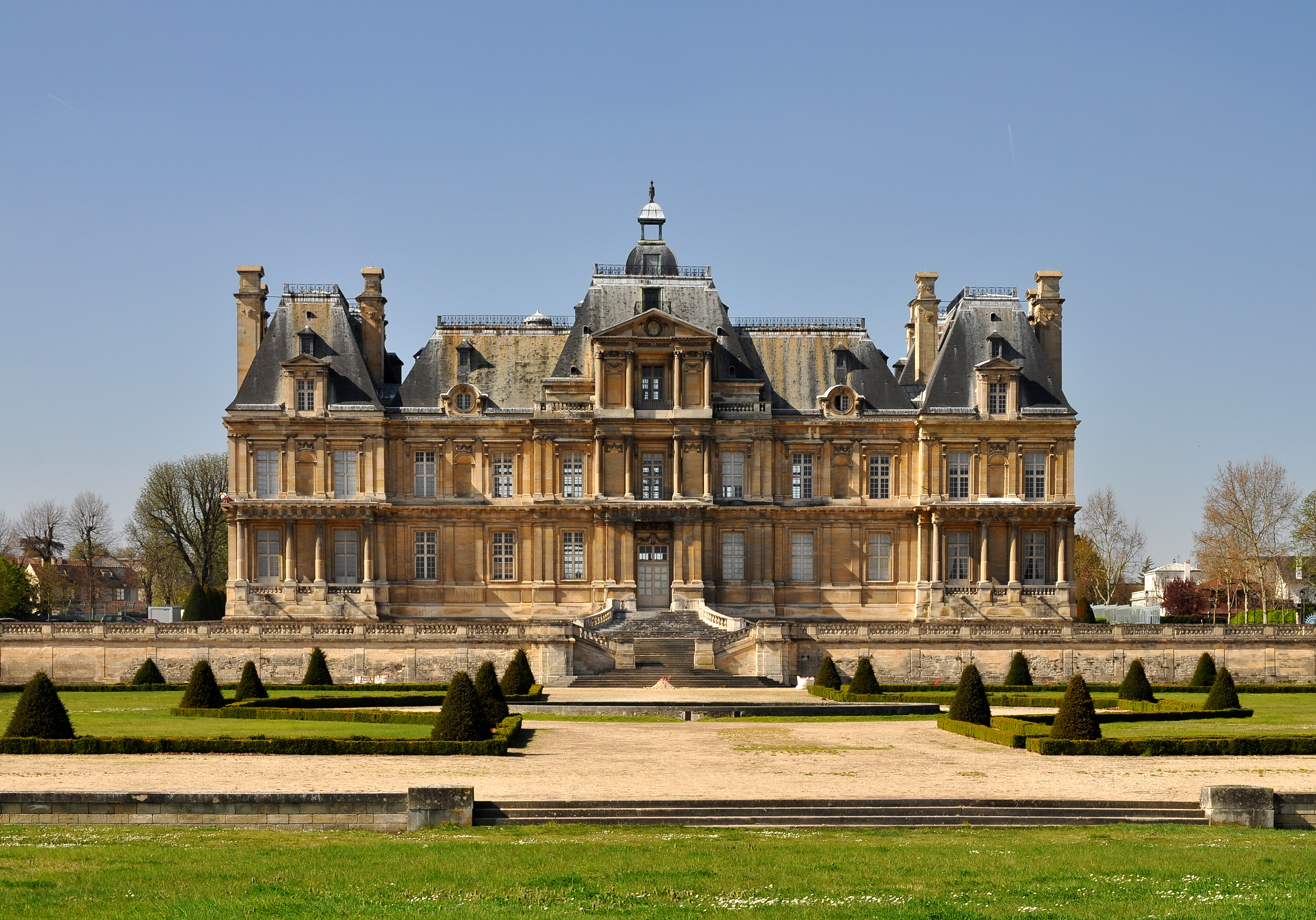
Château de Maisons, southeast-facing garden front

The Château de Maisons (now Château de Maisons-Laffitte [ʃato də mɛzɔ̃ lafit]), designed by François Mansart from 1630 to 1651, is a prime example of French Baroque architecture and a reference point in the history of French architecture. The château is located in Maisons-Laffitte, a northwestern suburb of Paris, in the department of Yvelines, Île-de-France.

== History ==
The Longueil family, long associated with the Parlement of Paris, had been in possession of part of the seigneurie of Maisons since 1460, and a full share since 1602. Beginning in 1630, and for the next decades, René de Longueil, first president of the Cour des aides and then président à mortier to the Parlement of Paris, devoted the fortune inherited by his wife, Madeleine Boulenc de Crévecœur (who died in 1636), to the construction of a magnificent château. By 1649, he was able to spend the summer months in his new house, but works on the outbuildings continued after that date. Louis XIV visited Maisons in April 1651.

The attribution to François Mansart was common knowledge among contemporaries. Charles Perrault reported its reputation: "The château of Maisons, of which he [Mansart] had made all the buildings and all the gardens, is of such a singular beauty that there is not a curious foreigner who does not go there to see it, as one of the finest things that we have in France."

Nevertheless, the sole surviving document mentioning Mansart's name is a payment of 20,000 livres from Longueil in 1657, apparently occasioned by the final completion of the château. A pamphlet with the title La Mansarade accused the architect of having realised, after completing the construction of the first floor, that he had committed an error in the plans and razed everything built so far in order to commence anew.

Perrault emphasizes that the architect had the habit of remodelling certain parts of his buildings more than once in a search for perfection.

After the death of René de Longueil, in 1677, the château passed to his heirs until 1732, and then in succession to the marquise de Belleforière, then to the marquis de Soyécourt. In 1777, it became the property of King Louis XVI's brother, Charles Philip, count of Artois, who carried out important interior transformations under the direction of his house architect François-Joseph Bélanger. These works were interrupted in 1782 for lack of funds. Maisons then ceased to be kept up.

Confiscated during the Revolution as "national goods", the château was sold in 1798 to an army provisioner, M. Lauchère, resold in 1804 to Marshal of the Empire Jean Lannes, and then resold once again, in 1818, to the Parisian banker Jacques Laffitte. Starting in 1834, Lafitte proceeded to develop the surrounding park as building lots; he tore down the fine stables to furnish construction materials for the purchasers. After his daughter, the Princesse de la Moskowa, sold the château in 1850, it passed to M. Thomas de Colmar, and to the painter William Tilman Grommé, who farmed out the small park and demolished the entrance gateway to the forecourt, enclosing the severely reduced space with a wrought-iron grille brought from the Château de Mailly in Picardy. Grommé died in 1900. In his last will, he ordered his whole property to the city of Viipuri, which decided to keep his art collection but sell the château.

In 1905, the State purchased the château to save it from demolition. It was classed as a monument historique in 1914.

== Architecture ==
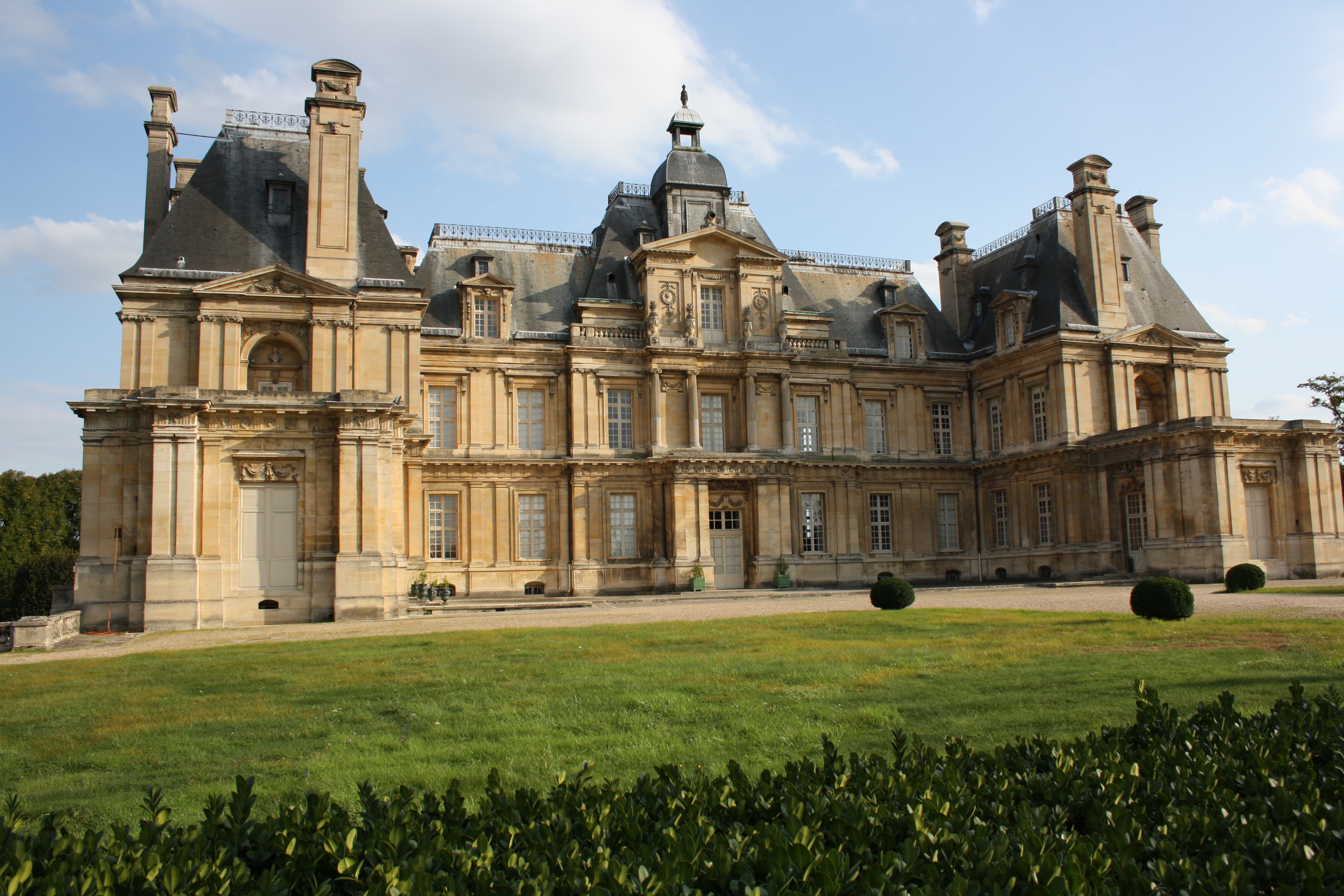
The cour d'honneur and the entrance front

The Château de Maisons was built between the Seine and the forest of Saint-Germain-en-Laye, with its garden front oriented to the southeast. Originally it comprised the garden, a small park of 33 hectares (82 acres) and a large outer park of 300 hectares (740 acres). The visitor arrived by one of two avenues that crossed in a T intersection before the gate to the cour d'honneur. The principal central axis led to the forest, the cross axis through the village to the southwest and to the river, thence on to Paris. Three gateways stood at the far ends of the avenues.

On either side of the avant-cour, Mansart constructed the stables, masterworks of architecture whose monumental character gave a preview of those that would be built at Versailles and Chantilly. Of these works, there remains only a grotto, which had served also to water the horses.

The château stood on a rectangular platform outlined in the French manner with a dry moat. The cour d'honneur was defined by terraces. The central block extends symmetrically into short wings, composed of several sections, each with its own roofline, with raked roofs and tall chimney stacks, in several ranges, with a broken façade reminiscent of the planning in work of Pierre Lescot and Philibert Delorme in the preceding century. The single pile construction, typical of its epoch, carries three storeys, a basement supporting a ground floor, and piano nobile with three attic floors above.

== Interiors ==
The grand central entrance vestibule of stone was originally enclosed by exceptionally fine wrought-iron grilles, which are today at the Louvre. Large bas-reliefs of The Seasons were executed by Gilles Guérin after drawings provided by Jacques Sarazin, who oversaw all the sculpture provided for Maisons. There are lunettes representing The Elements, for which Sarazin's drawings also survive. This vestibule gives onto two state apartments. The apartment on the left, called the Appartement des Captifs, was that of René de Longueuil; it has retained its original decor. The chimneypiece of the corner room, the chambre de parade represents a bas-relief medallion of Louis XIII supported by captives and a frieze of the triumph of Louis XIII, works of Gilles Guérin that have given a name to the suite of rooms.

The apartment on the right, called the Appartement de la Renommée, was entirely redecorated by Bélanger for the comte d'Artois, in a discreet neoclassical style quite in keeping with the general classic style of the château.

The staircase was of a type that Mansart originated at the Château de Balleroy, in which the central space is left open so that the flights climb the four walls.

Interior of the ground floor

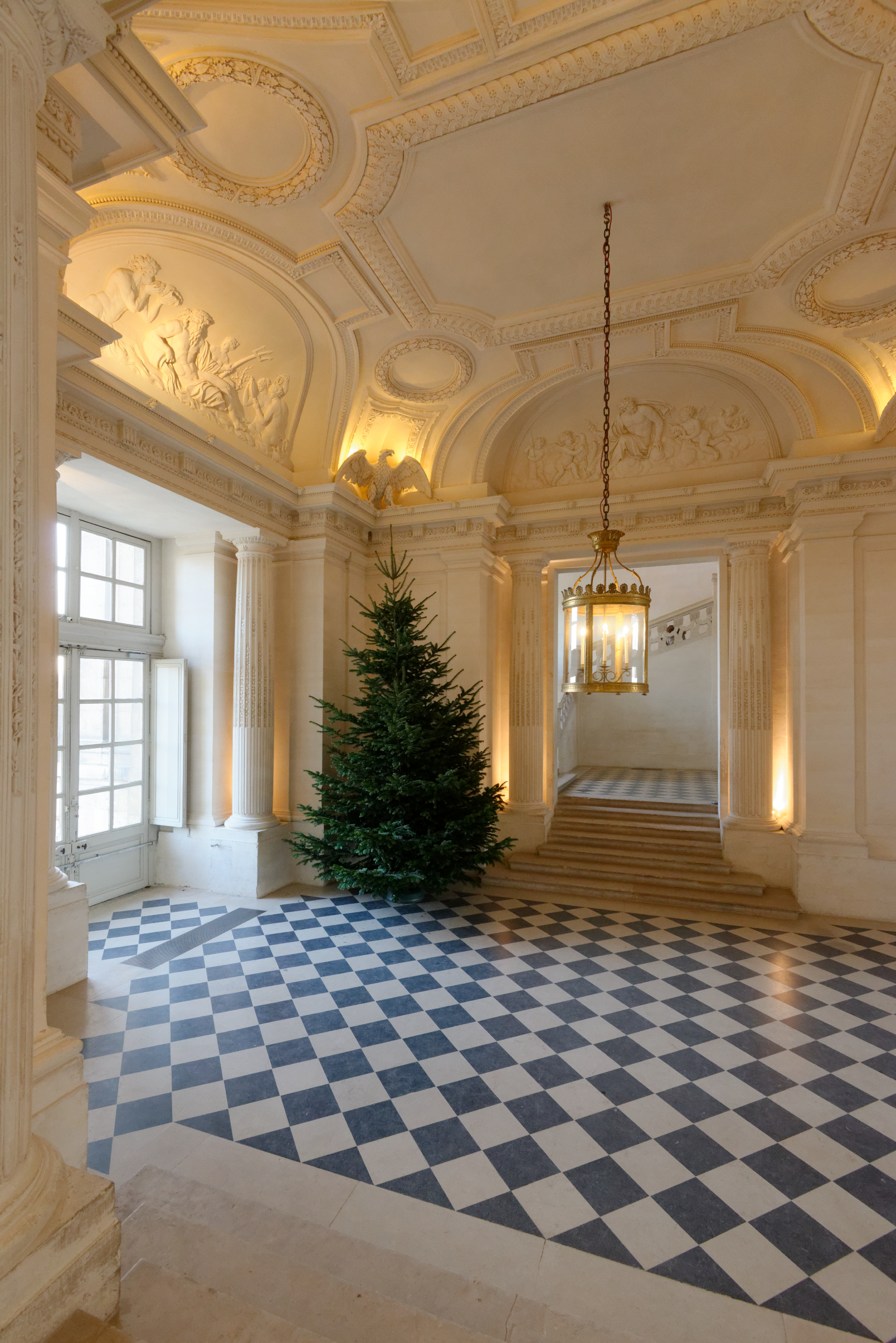
Main vestibule, viewed toward the stair hall in the right wing

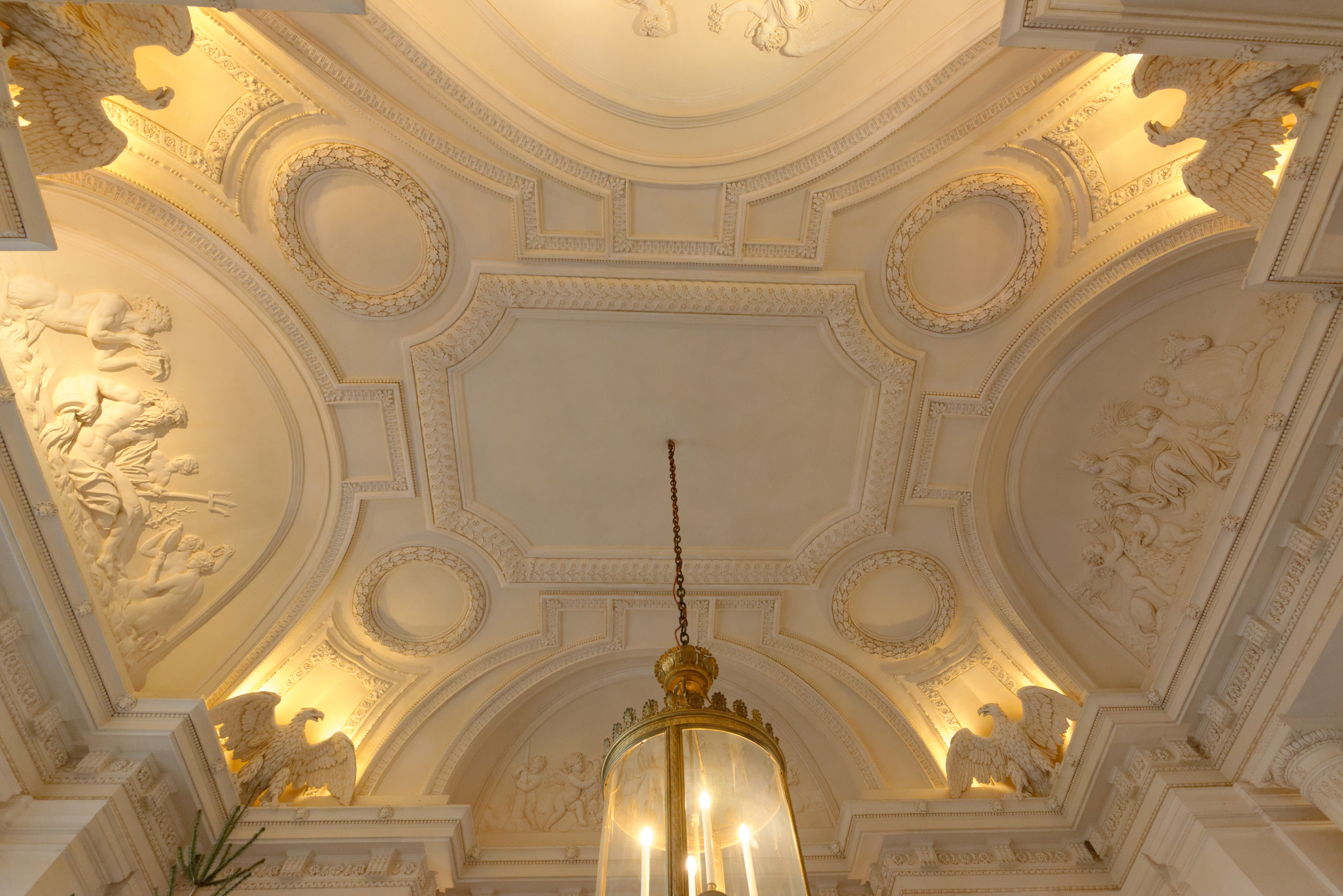
Main vestibule ceiling

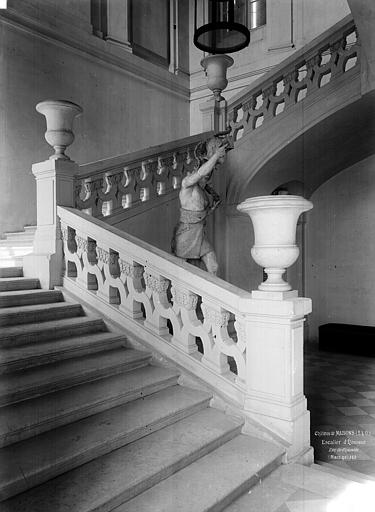
Main staircase in 1890

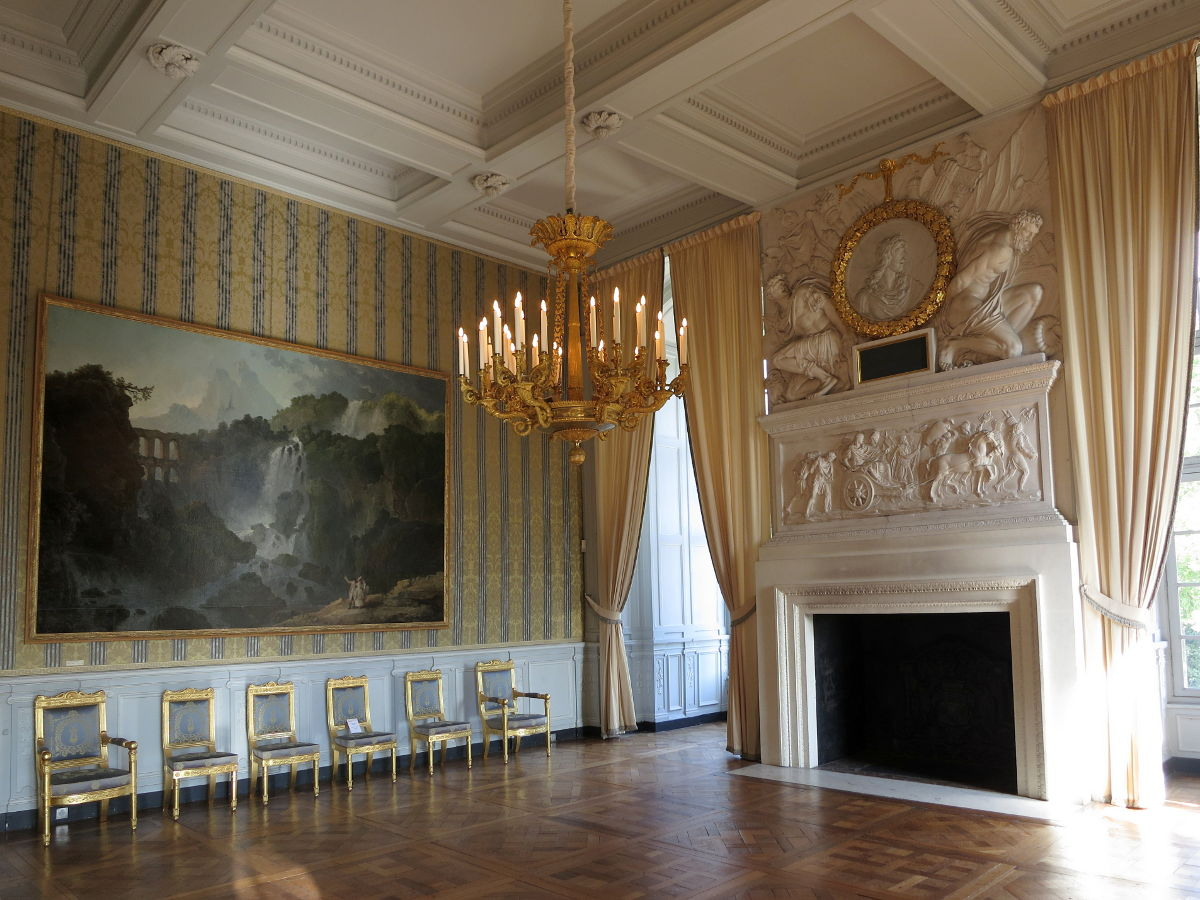
Chambre des Captifs

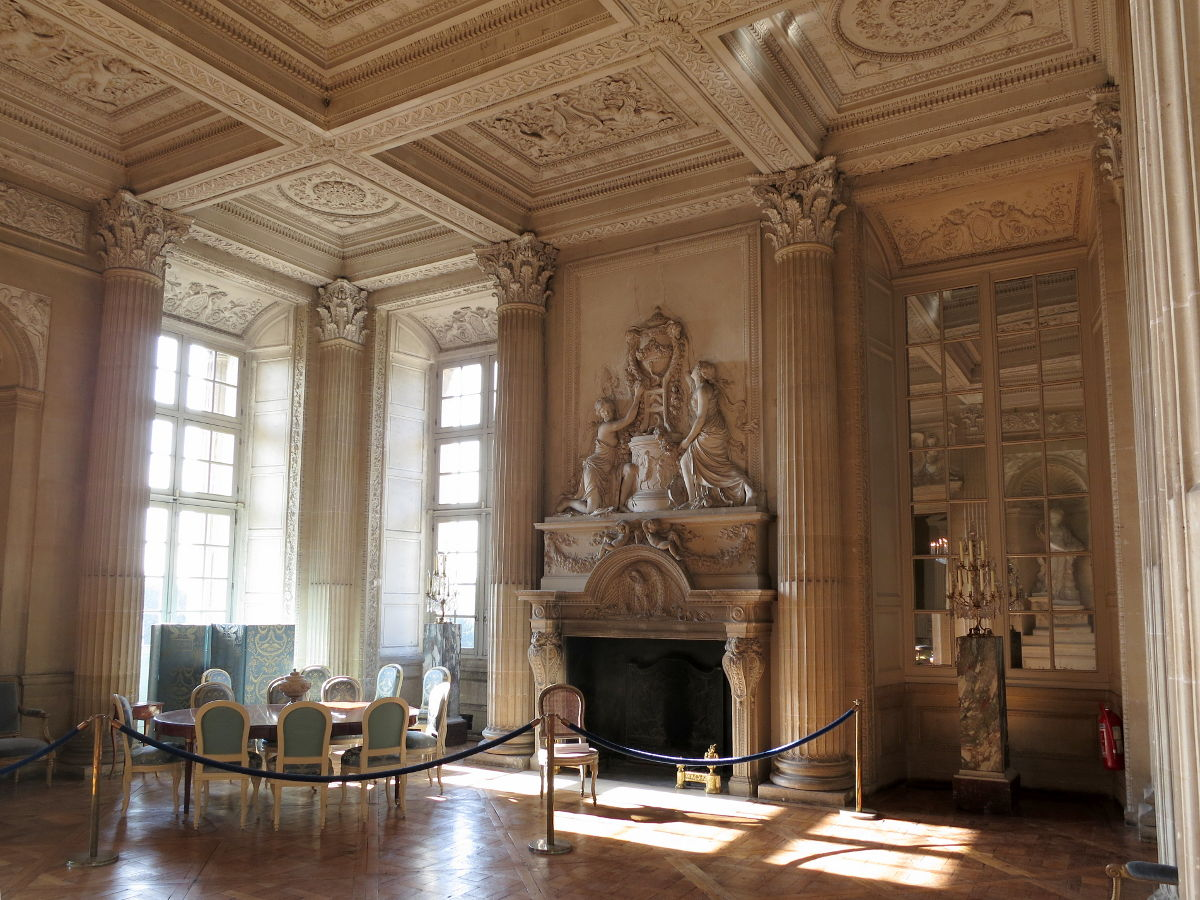
Appartement de la Renommée or Salle à Manger (dining room)

On the parade or main floor, the apartment to the right, called the Appartement des Aigles for the Empire style decoration effected by maréchal Lannes in expectation of the visit of Napoleon, is undistinguished. The one to the left, on the other hand, the Appartement du Roi, is also called à l'italienne in that it is covered in false vaulting. The apartment consists of a vast Salle des Fêtes employed also in the character of a guardroom, with a tribune for musicians. It opens into the Salon d'Hercule from the painting of Hercules defeating the Hydra that used to be featured on the chimneybreast, with sculptures by Guérin. In the end pavilion is a domed room articulated by therm figures, a precursor to the grand salon of Vaux-le-Vicomte. A small oval cabinet, or private withdrawing room, the Cabinet aux Miroirs (Mirror Room) bears a refined decor, and a parquet floor inlaid with pewter and bone.

Interior of the main floor

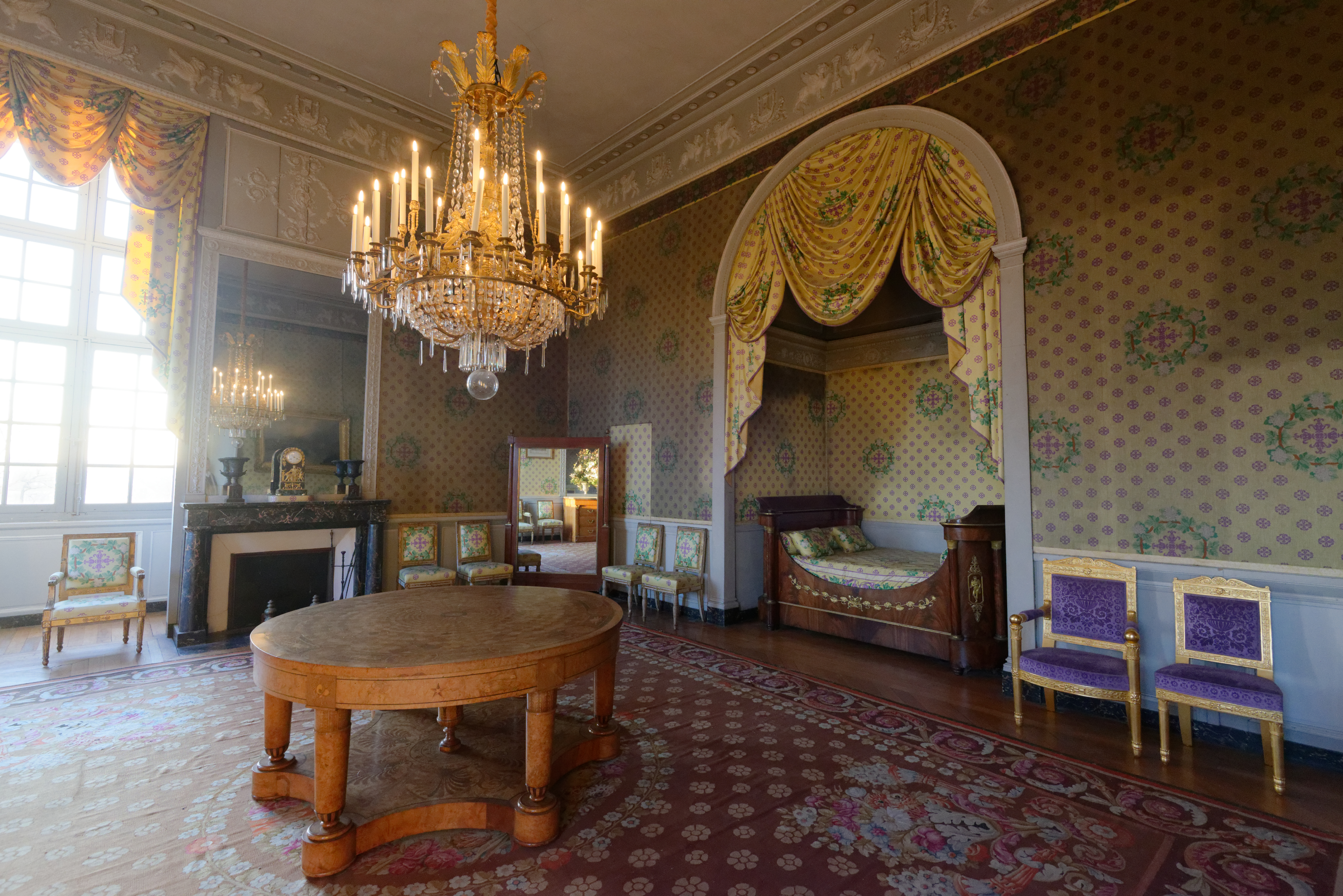
Bedroom of maréchal Lannes

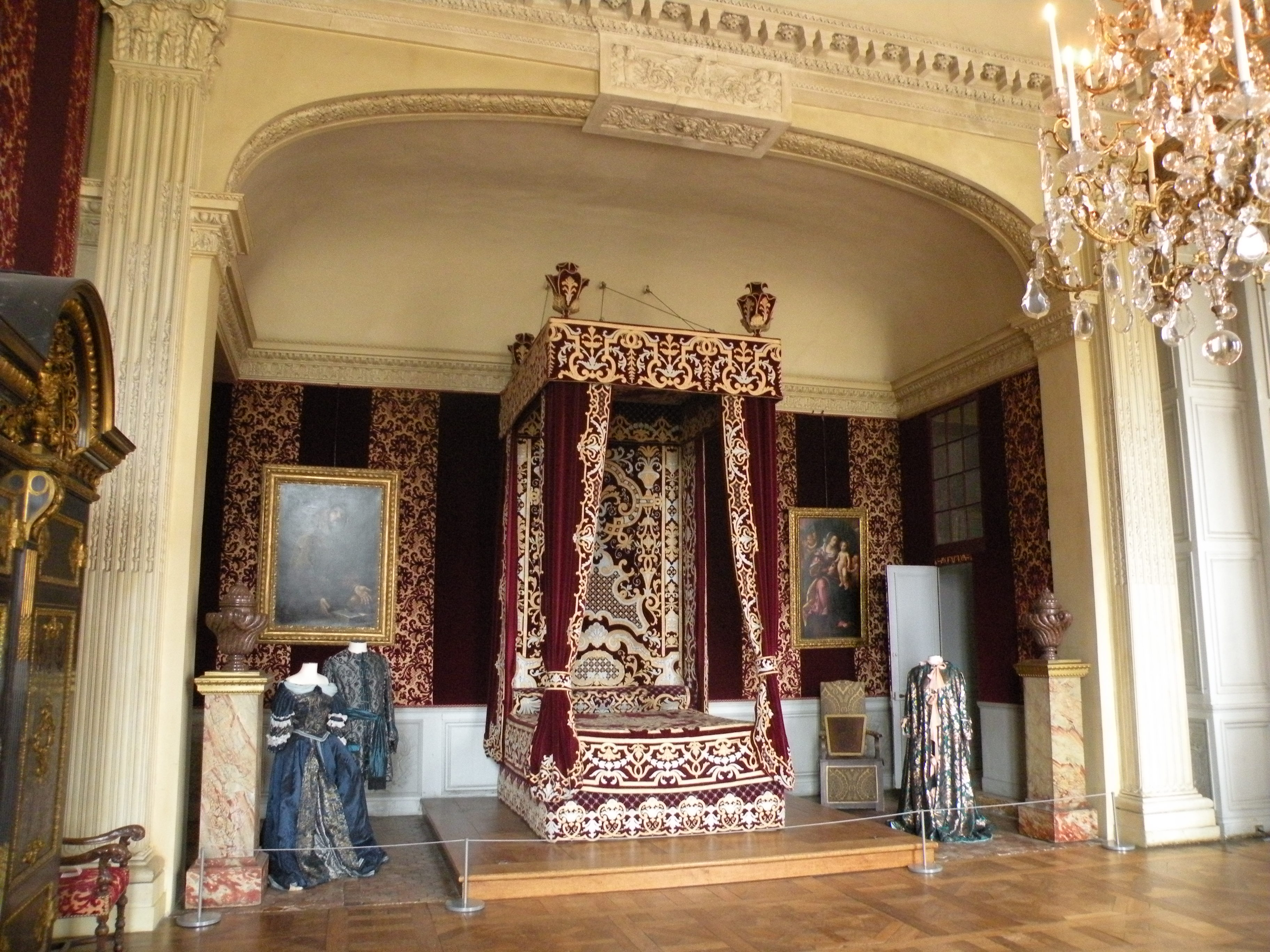
Bed alcove of the Chambre du Roi

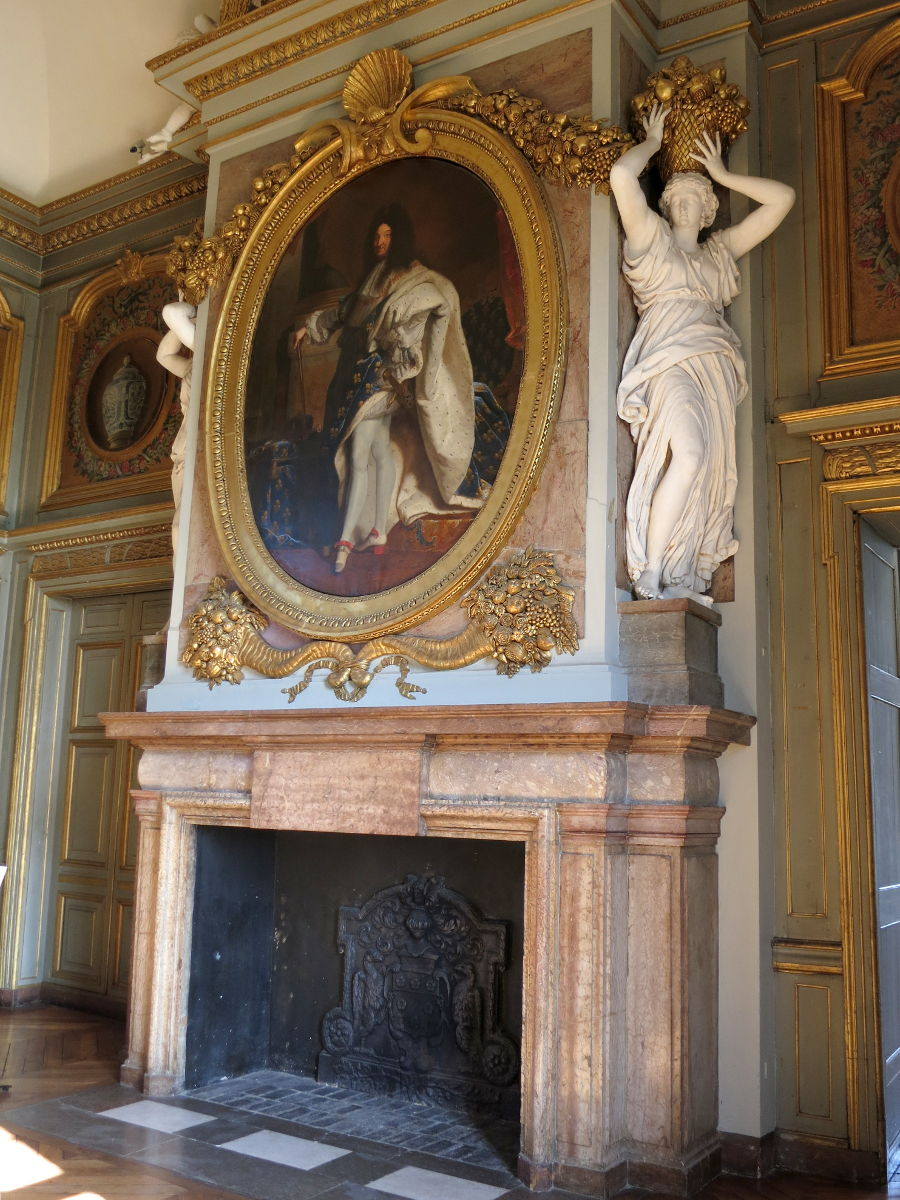
Fireplace in the Salon d'Hercule

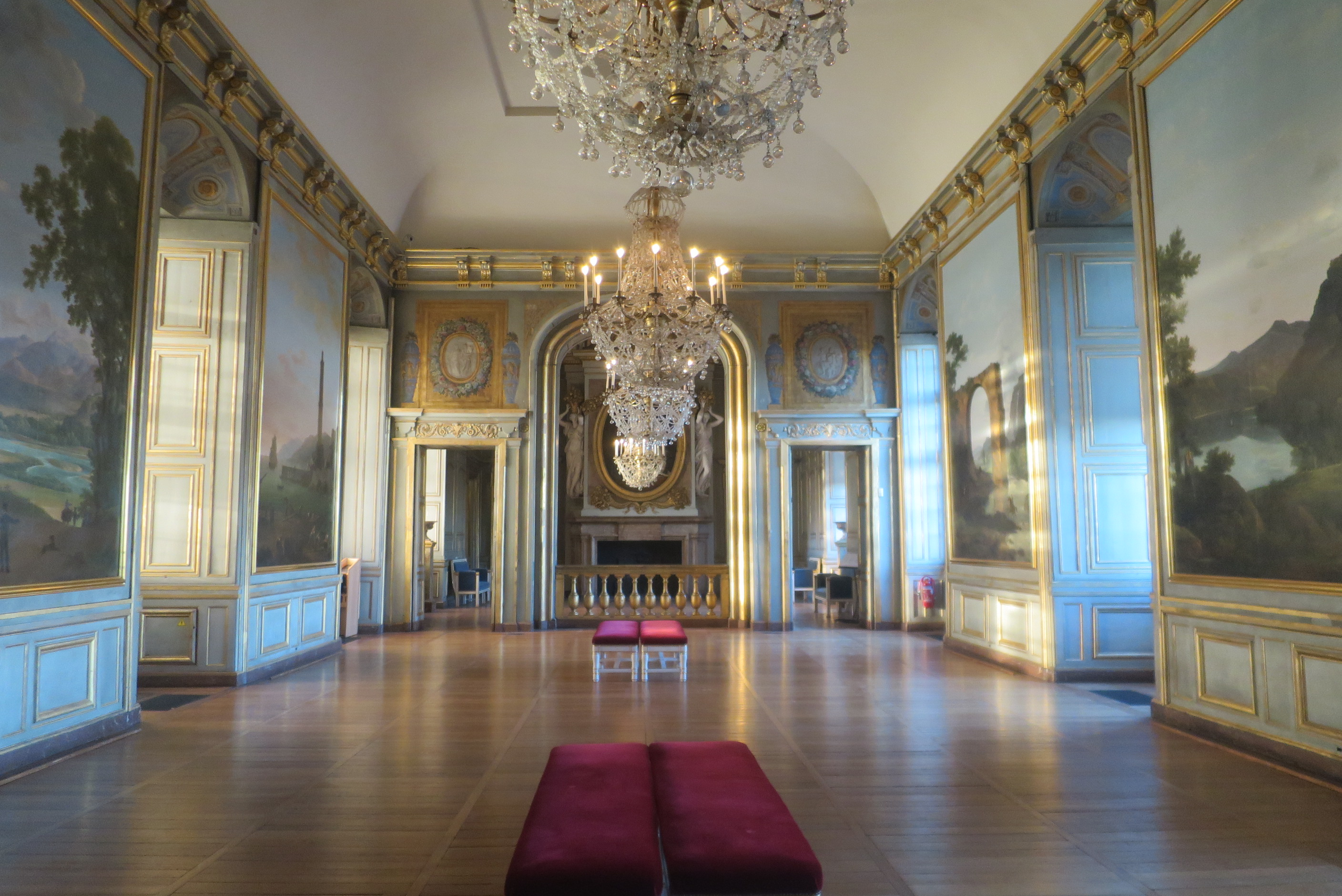
Salle des Fêtes, looking towards the fireplace

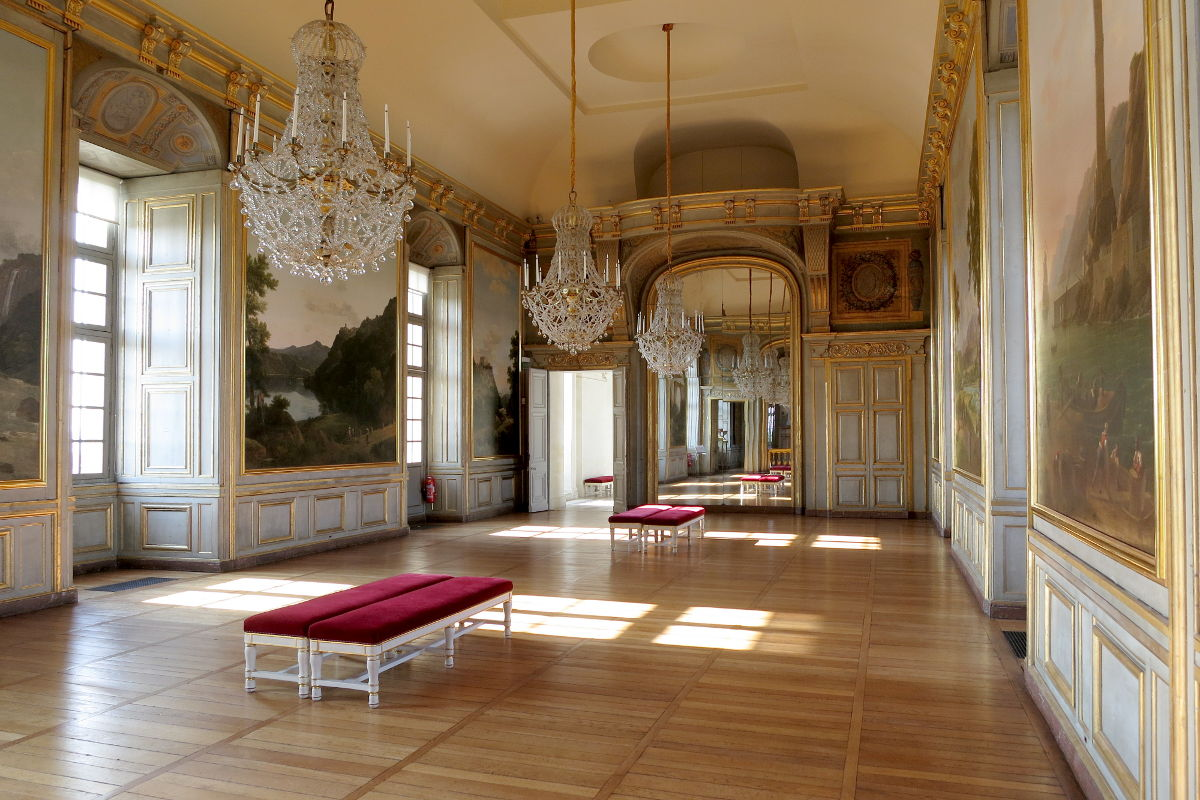
Salle des Fêtes, looking towards the musicians gallery

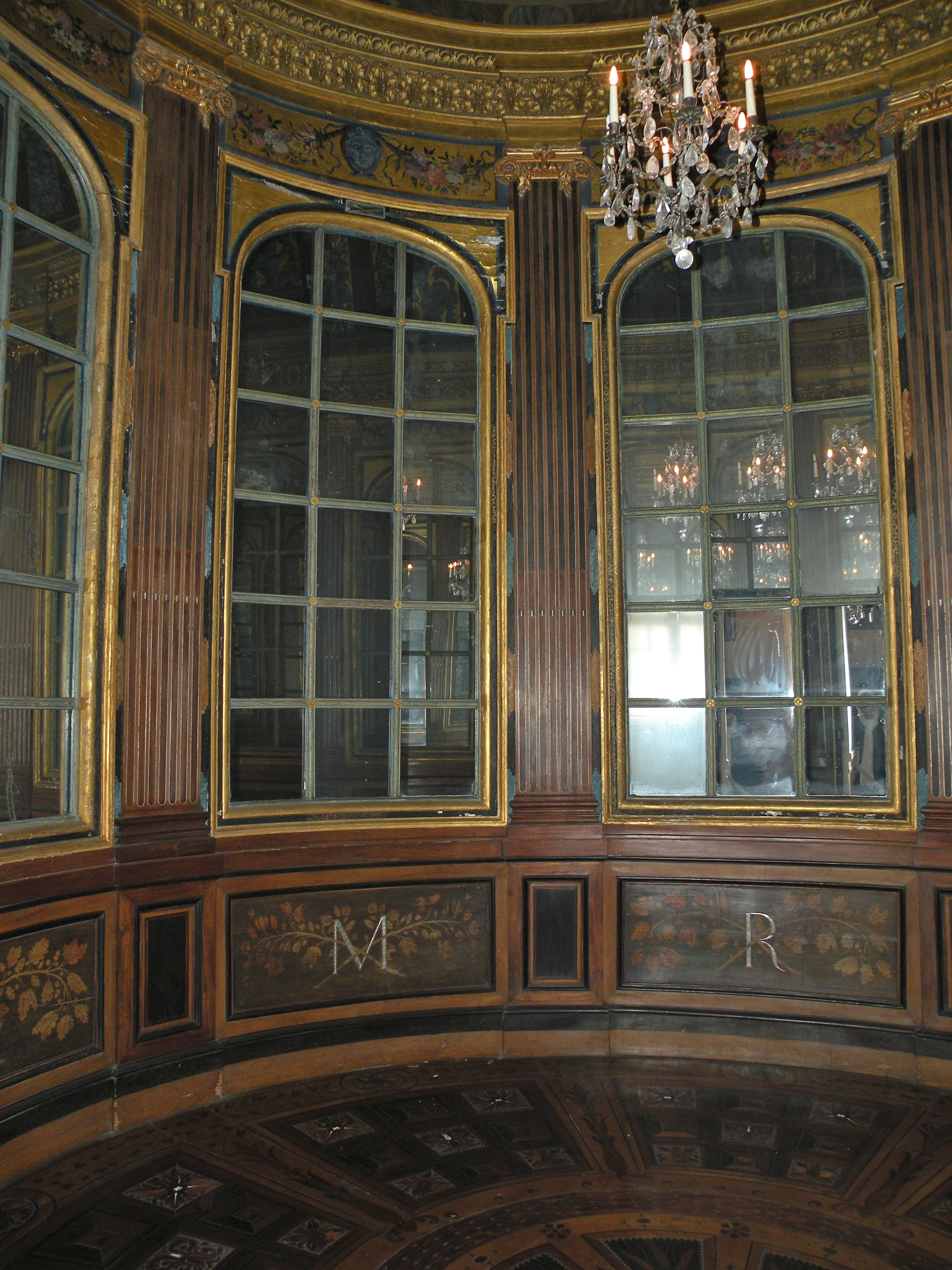
Cabinet aux Miroirs

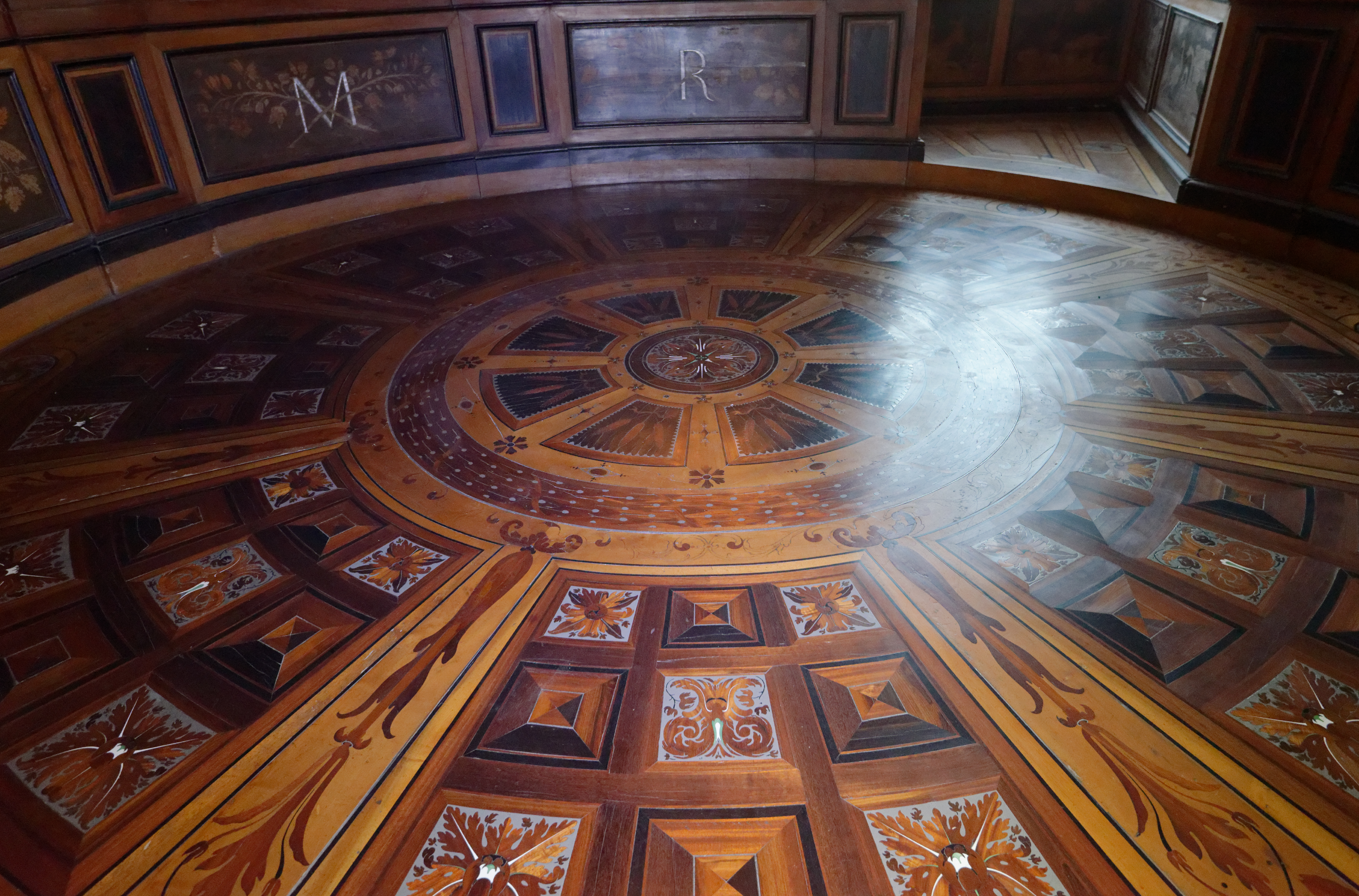
Floor of the Cabinet aux Miroirs

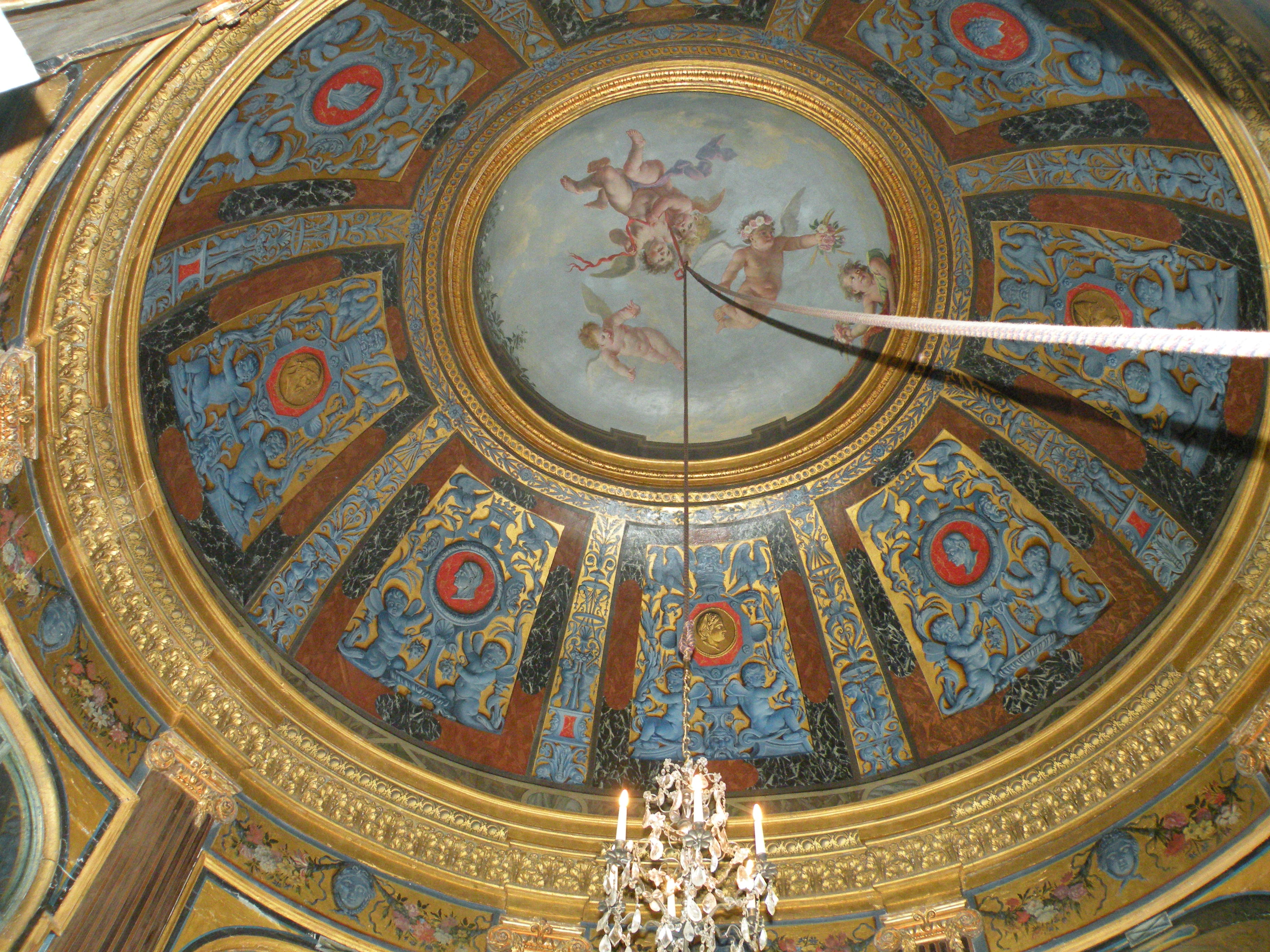
Ceiling of the Cabinet aux Miroirs

== Influence on architecture ==
- The Château de Franconville, at Saint-Martin-du-Tertre (Val-d'Oise), built by Gabriel-Hippolyte Destailleur for the duc de Massa in 1876, takes Maisons for its model.
- In the suburbs of Beijing, the Chinese multi-millionaire real-estate developer Zhang Yuchen built a copy of the Château, enhancing it by adding two wings from the Palace of Fontainebleau. The building cost $50 million, contains a hotel and seminar center, and opened in 2004. It is called Zhang-Laffitte. (40°7′49″N 116°26′32″E)
- The Constitución Railway Station in Buenos Aires, Argentina, opened on 1 January 1887 and was rebuilt in 1900.

== See also ==
- List of Baroque residences
- 17th-century Western domes
