= Ermitage International School Paris =

Location
- 46 avenue Eglé, Maisons-Laffitte; France; 48°57′34″N 2°9′22″E

Information
- Type: Private
- Motto: Engage, Prosper, and Succeed
- Established: 1941; 85 years ago
- Founder: Anne-Marie Thommeret
- Grades: Pre-K to Grade 12
- Enrollment: 1600
- Language: English and French
- Website: https://www.ermitage.fr/

Ermitage International School Paris is an international bilingual and boarding school located in Maisons-Laffitte, in the western suburbs of Paris just 20 minutes from central Paris. Founded in 1941 by Anne-Marie Thommeret during the German occupation of France, the school provides bilingual French–English education from early childhood to upper secondary level. The institution offers both the French Baccalaureate with an international option (BFI) and the International Baccalaureate (IB) programmes. The school operates across several sites in Maisons-Laffitte and includes boarding facilities for secondary-level students.

== History ==
The school was founded in 1941 during World War II, at a time when access to education in the Paris region was restricted under the German occupation and civilian resources were limited. Anne-Marie Thommeret, then a university student in French literature, began providing classes to local children, which led to the establishment of the school.

Following the destruction of the school’s initial premises during an Allied bombing raid targeting nearby railway infrastructure, the school relocated to alternative buildings in Maisons-Laffitte. The institution continued to operate with a small number of students during the war years and gradually expanded in the post-war period.

In 1980, influenced by the international community in Maisons-Laffitte, the school introduced a bilingual educational model and adopted an approach focused on internationalism. Building on this orientation, Ermitage International School Paris launched the international option of the French Baccalaureate (BFI) in 2003. Two years later, in 2005, the school joined the Round Square network, connecting it to over 200 schools across five continents and facilitating international student exchanges. Continuing its commitment to international education, Ermitage incorporated the International Baccalaureate (IB) programmes into its curriculum in 2009.

== Campus & Location ==
The school's campus stretches across multiple buildings in Maisons-Laffitte, a great part of them located in the historical park area. Some of the principal locations include:

- 10 avenue Desaix (French Bilingual Primary School)
- 46 avenue Eglé (IB School and offices)
- 24 avenue Eglé (French Bilingual Middle School)
- 18 rue des Côtes (French Bilingual High School)

== Academics programmes ==
Ermitage Paris offers a choice between the French programme with bilingual options, from age 3 to 18, and the International Baccalaureate (IB) programme in English, from age 5 to 18.

=== French Bilingual Programme ===
Accredited by the French National Ministry of Education, French Bilingual programmes offer several options to meet the needs of each family, including the International Option Baccalaureate (BFI). It starts at age 3 with the French Bilingual Primary School, followed from age 11 by the French Bilingual Middle School, and finishes from age 14 with the French Bilingual High School. From Middle School onwards, classes are primarily taught in French, with the possibility of studying English and other languages at an advanced level.

=== International Baccalaureate (IB) Programmes ===
Ermitage Paris is recognised as an IB World School. In addition to the IB Primary Years Programme (PYP) for students aged 5 to 10, the school is authorised to deliver both the IB Middle Years Programme (MYP) and the IB Diploma Programme (DP). The innovative IB pedagogical approach puts students at the centre of their learning. Learning is in English with all students also taking French classes (beginner to native level). An English as an Additional Language (EAL) Intensive or Enhanced programme is available for students in MYP.

== Student body ==
Ermitage International School Paris enrolls students from early childhood through upper secondary education. The student population includes both French and international students. In 2026-2027 the school has approximately 1,600 students, covering more than 80 nationalities.

Classes are organised by age, grade level and average around 15 students per class in International Baccalaureate Programme and 23 in French Bilingual Programmes.

== Boarding ==
The school offers boarding facilities for secondary-level students, with options for 5-day and 7-day boarding. Ermitage Paris has four boarding houses scattered throughout the Maisons-Laffitte park, which can accommodate 78 students aged 11 to 18.

== Notable former students ==
- Rose Leslie
- Emma Watson
