= René de Longueil =

French politician (1596–1677)

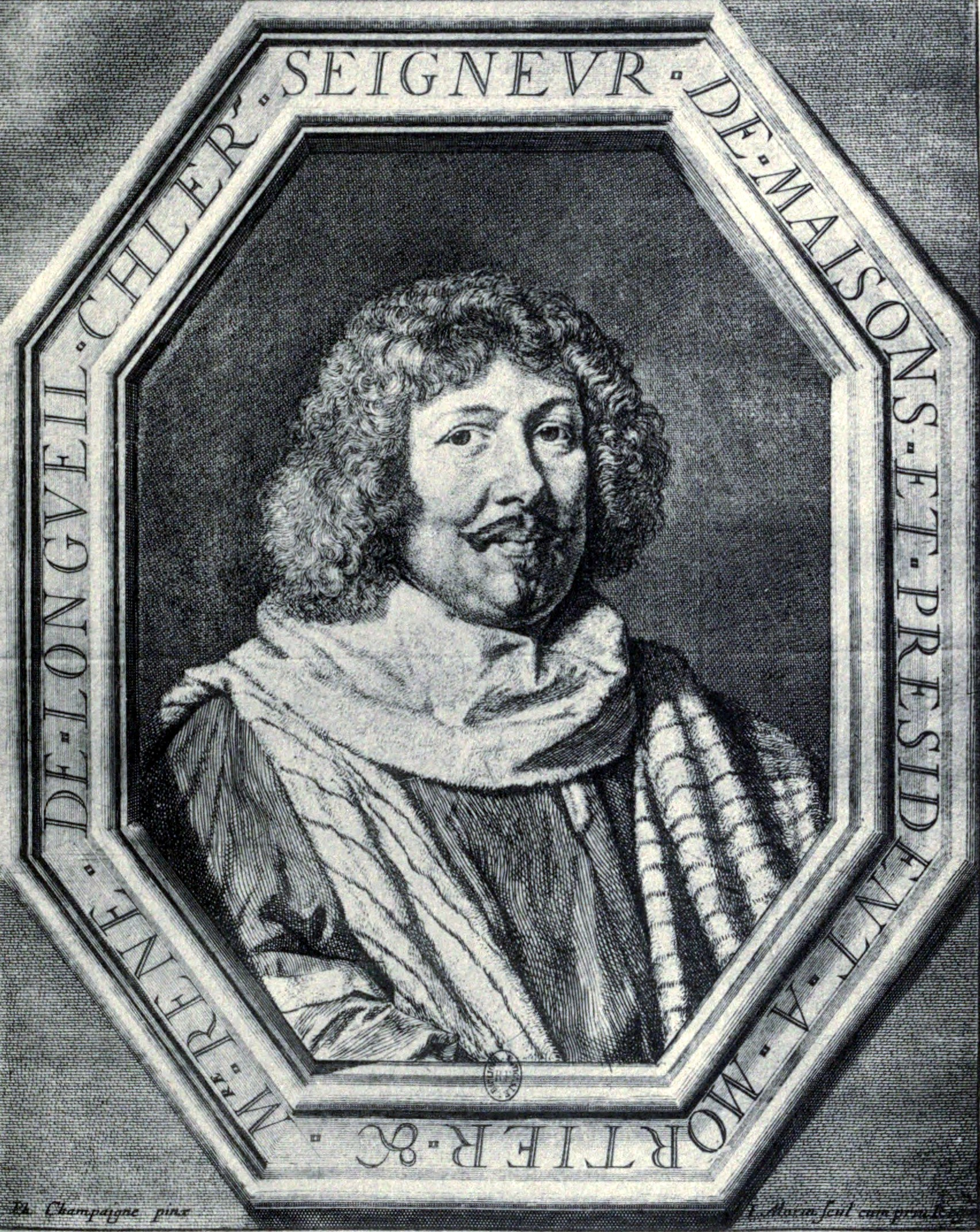

René de Longueil, marquis (1658) de Maisons (1596–1677), le président de Maisons, was Surintendant des Finances under Louis XIV. He built the Château de Maisons.

== Biography ==
He was born to a family of Parisian parlementaires of long standing that could trace back their origins to 1269. He was councilor to the Parlement's Grand Conseil in 1618 and then Premier Président de la Cour des aides in 1620. On 22 May 1622, he married Madeleine Boulenc de Crévecoeur (1609–1636) daughter of a rich magistrate of the Chambre des comptes. They had four children before Madeleine de Longueuil died prematurely. René did not remarry.

In 1642, René de Longueil became Président à mortier to the Parlement de Paris, a high position in the judicial hierarchy. In 1645, he was appointed governor of the châteaux of Versailles, of Saint-Germain-en-Laye and of Evreux; however, with the death of his patrons Cardinal Richelieu (1642) and Louis XIII (1643) he was forced to be reconciled with Cardinal Mazarin, distrustful of the parlementaires, in spite of his personal attachment to prince de Condé. His moderate attitude during the Fronde permitted him to come through uncompromised.

He was appointed Superintendent of Finance 23 May 1650. In mid-April 1651 he gave a sumptuous fête for Anne of Austria, the young Louis XIV and his brother Philippe, duc d'Anjou, which compromised the integrity of his position— as it would do disastrously for Nicolas Fouquet at Vaux— and at the majority of Louis XIV Longeuil was relieved of his post, 5 September 1651. He remained a member of the council with the title of Minister of State, and retained his parliamentary position as Président à mortier. In 1653, his position as governor of châteaux was withdrawn. For five years he lived in exile at Maisons and at his residence at Glisolles, near the abbey of Saint-Pierre de Conches (Eure).

In 1656, Longueil married his daughter to the marquis de Soyecourt, who held an important court appointment, and began his return to royal favour. In 1658 his domaine at Maisons was made the seat of a marquisate. In 1671, René de Longueil received a royal visit of several days from Louis XIV. He died in 1677.

== Coat of arms ==
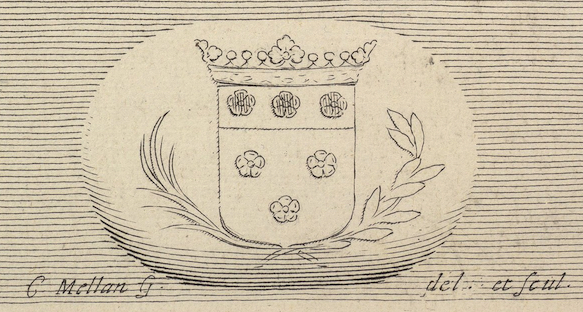
Escutcheon René de Longueil

The arms of the Baron de Longueuil and of Longueuil city

The crest of the house of Longueil, as it can be found in the French town coat of arms of Maisons-Laffitte, is the following: "Azure, three roses argent 2 + 1, a chief or three roses gules per fess". It is worth mentioning that in Montreal in 1668 (i.e. during René's lifetime), the son of an innkeeper and a resident of Longueil, Dieppe-born Charles le Moyne, was ennobled by Louis XIV, establishing the title of Baron de Longueuil. With the coat of arms that he received, the resemblance to that of the Parisian family is obvious and since a genealogical connection has yet to be established, this design may have been made with René's acceptance or knowledge. The town of Longueil (9 miles southwest of Dieppe) in France later adopted elements from the arms of these barons (and to a certain extent also from the similar arms of René de Longueil's family of Paris) in their coat of arms. Furthermore, the Canadian city of Longueuil, located next to Montreal, received in 2004, with the permission of Raymond Grant, Baron de Longueuil, the coat of arms of the barons as its city crest.
