= François Mansart =

French architect (1598–1666)

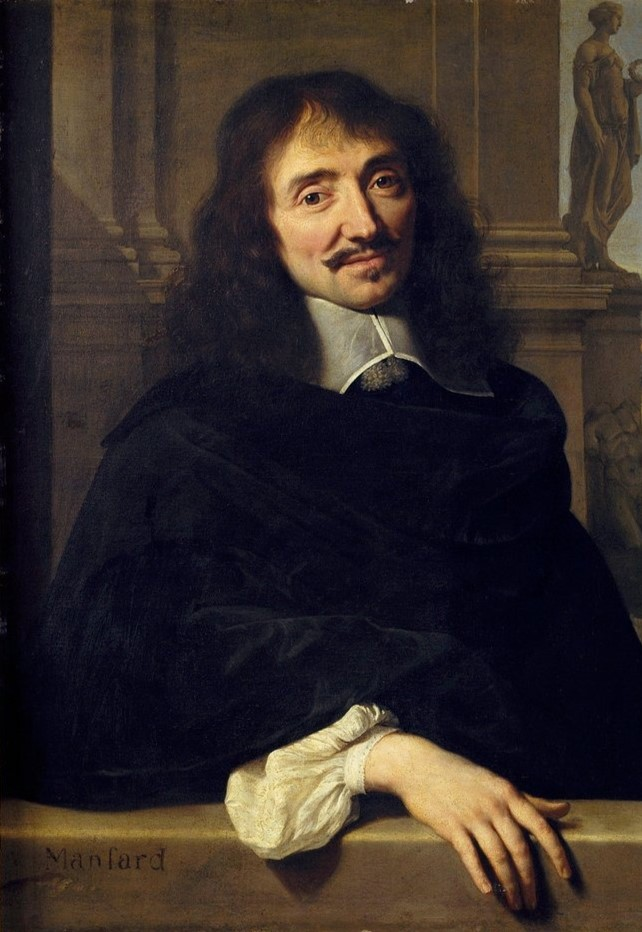
- François Mansart, detail of a double portrait of Mansart and Claude Perrault, by Philippe de Champaigne, 1656
- Born: 23 January 1598; Paris
- Died: 23 September 1666 (aged 68); Paris
- Education: studio of Salomon de Brosse
- Occupation: Architect
- Buildings: Château de Balleroy, Temple du Marais, Château de Maisons, Church of the Val-de-Grâce
- Projects: Château de Blois
- Design: plans to redesign the Louvre and the royal necropolis at Saint-Denis

François Mansart (French pronunciation: [fʁɑ̃swa mɑ̃saʁ]; 23 January 1598 – 23 September 1666) was a French architect credited with introducing classicism into the Baroque architecture of France. The Encyclopædia Britannica identifies him as the most accomplished of 17th-century French architects whose works "are renowned for their high degree of refinement, subtlety, and elegance".

Mansart, as he is generally known, popularized the mansard roof, a four-sided, double slope gambrel roof punctuated with windows on the steeper lower slope, which created additional habitable space in the garrets.

== Career ==
François Mansart was born on 23 January 1598 to a master carpenter in Paris. He was not trained as an architect; his relatives helped train him as a stonemason and a sculptor. He is thought to have learned the skills of an architect in the studio of Salomon de Brosse, the most popular architect in France during the reign of Henry IV.

Mansart was recognized from the 1620s onward for his style and skill as an architect, but he was viewed as a stubborn and difficult perfectionist, who tore down his structures in order to start building them over again. Only the wealthiest could afford to have him work for them as Mansart's constructions cost "more money than the Great Turk himself possesses".

The only surviving example of his early work is the Château de Balleroy, commissioned by a chancellor to Gaston, Duke of Orléans. Construction started in 1626. The duke was so pleased with the result that he invited Mansart to renovate his Château de Blois (1635). Mansart intended to rebuild this former royal residence completely, but only the north wing was reconstructed to Mansart's designs, which made clever use classical orders. In 1632, Mansart designed the Church of St. Mary of the Visitation in Paris using the Pantheon in Rome as an inspiration.

Most of Mansart's buildings have been reconstructed or demolished. The best preserved example of his mature style is the Château de Maisons, which retains its original interior decoration, including a magnificent staircase. The structure is symmetrical, with much attention given to relief. It is thought to have heralded and inspired 18th-century Neoclassicism.

In the 1640s, Mansart worked on the convent and church of Val-de-Grâce in Paris, a much coveted commission from Anne of Austria. Following allegations of profligacy in the management of the project's costs, he was replaced with a more tractable architect, who largely followed Mansart's design.

In the 1650s, Mansart was targeted by political enemies of the prime minister Cardinal Mazarin, for whom Mansart frequently worked. In 1651, they published "La Mansarade", a pamphlet accusing Mansart of wild extravagance and machinations.

After Louis XIV's accession to the throne, Mansart lost many of his commissions to other architects. His designs for the remodeling of the Louvre were not executed because he would not submit detailed plans.

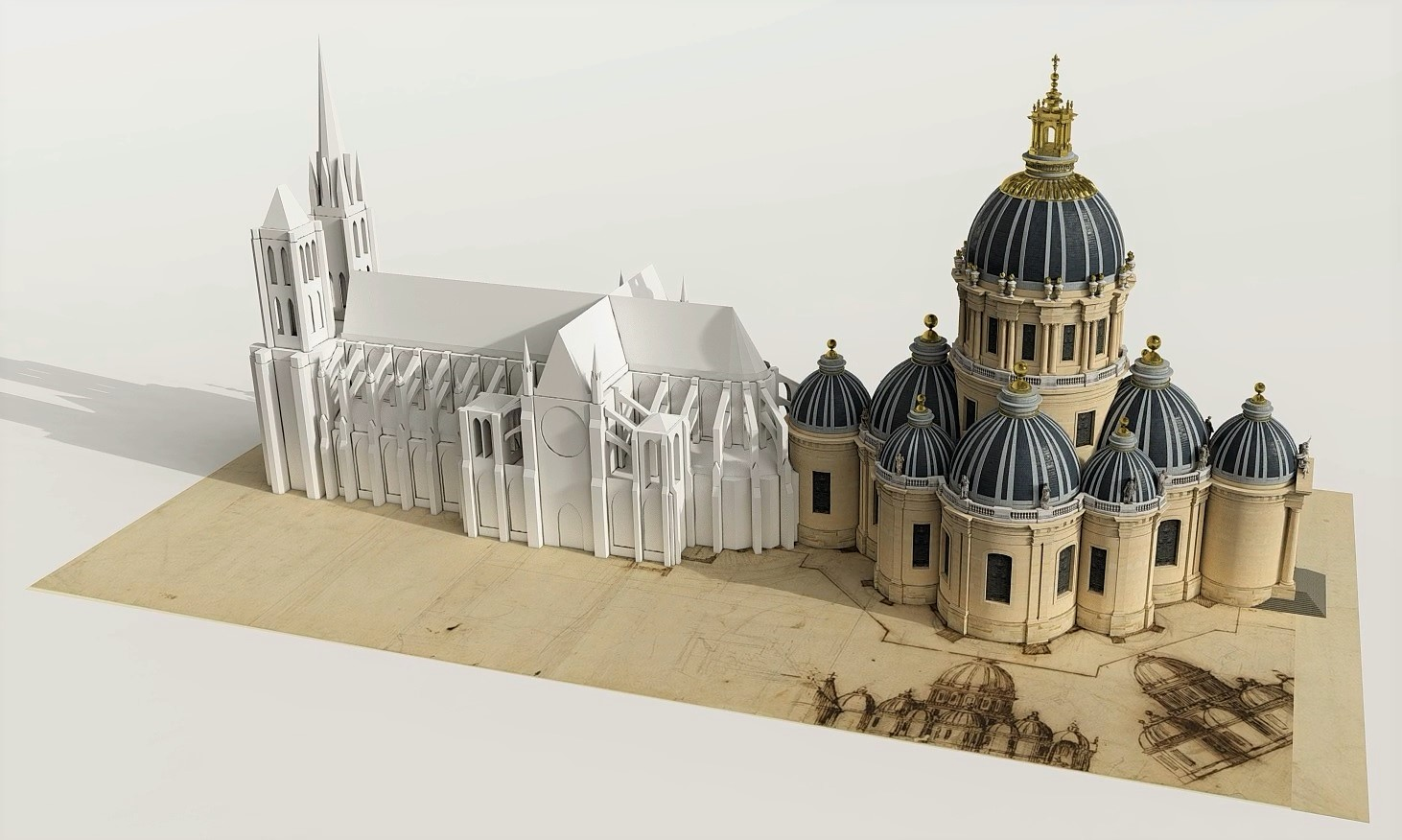
A model of one of Mansart's designs for the Chapel of the Bourbons.

In the year before his death he produced two plans for the proposed Chapelle des Bourbons, a complex of funeral chapels for the Bourbon kings of France to be added to the Basilica of Saint-Denis which houses the tombs of French royals. Both were presented to Jean-Baptiste Colbert. Gian Lorenzo Bernini also made plans for this project, also unbuilt.

Some of his plans were reused by his grandnephew, Jules Hardouin Mansart, notably for Les Invalides. Mansart died in Paris on 23 September 1666.

== Gallery ==
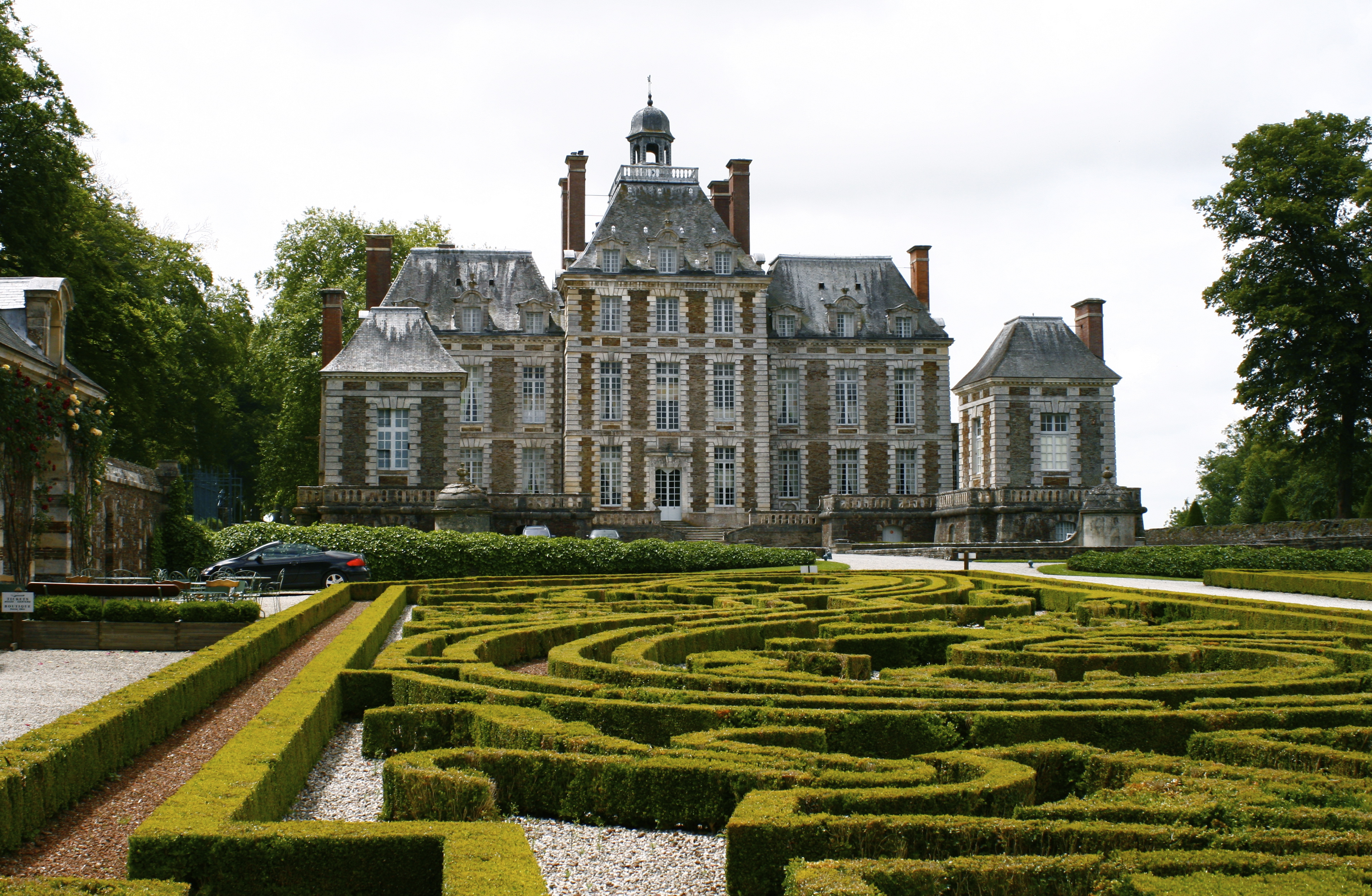
The Château de Balleroy, Mansart's earliest surviving work

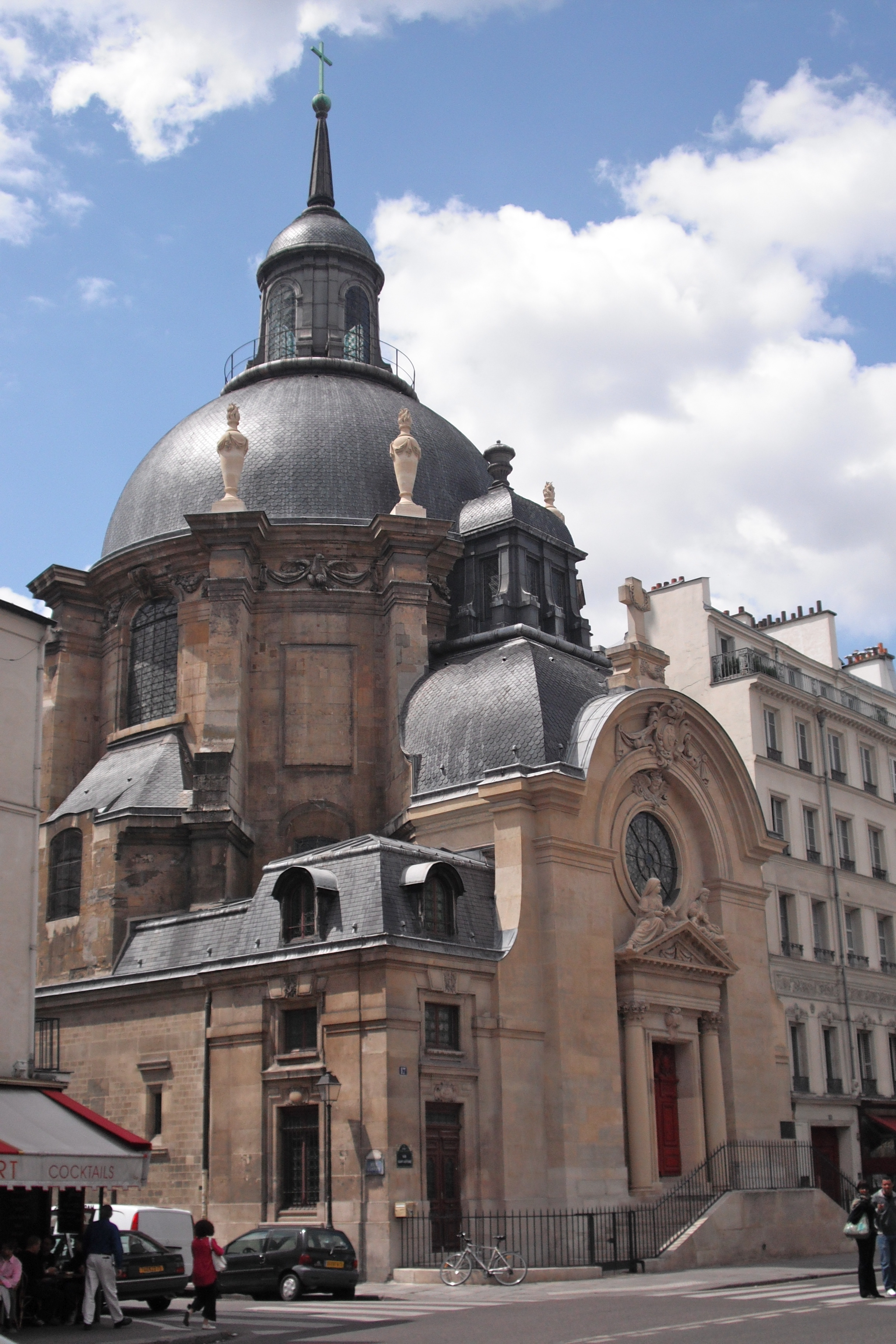
The Church of the Visitation in the Rue Saint-Antoine, Paris, now the Temple du Marais

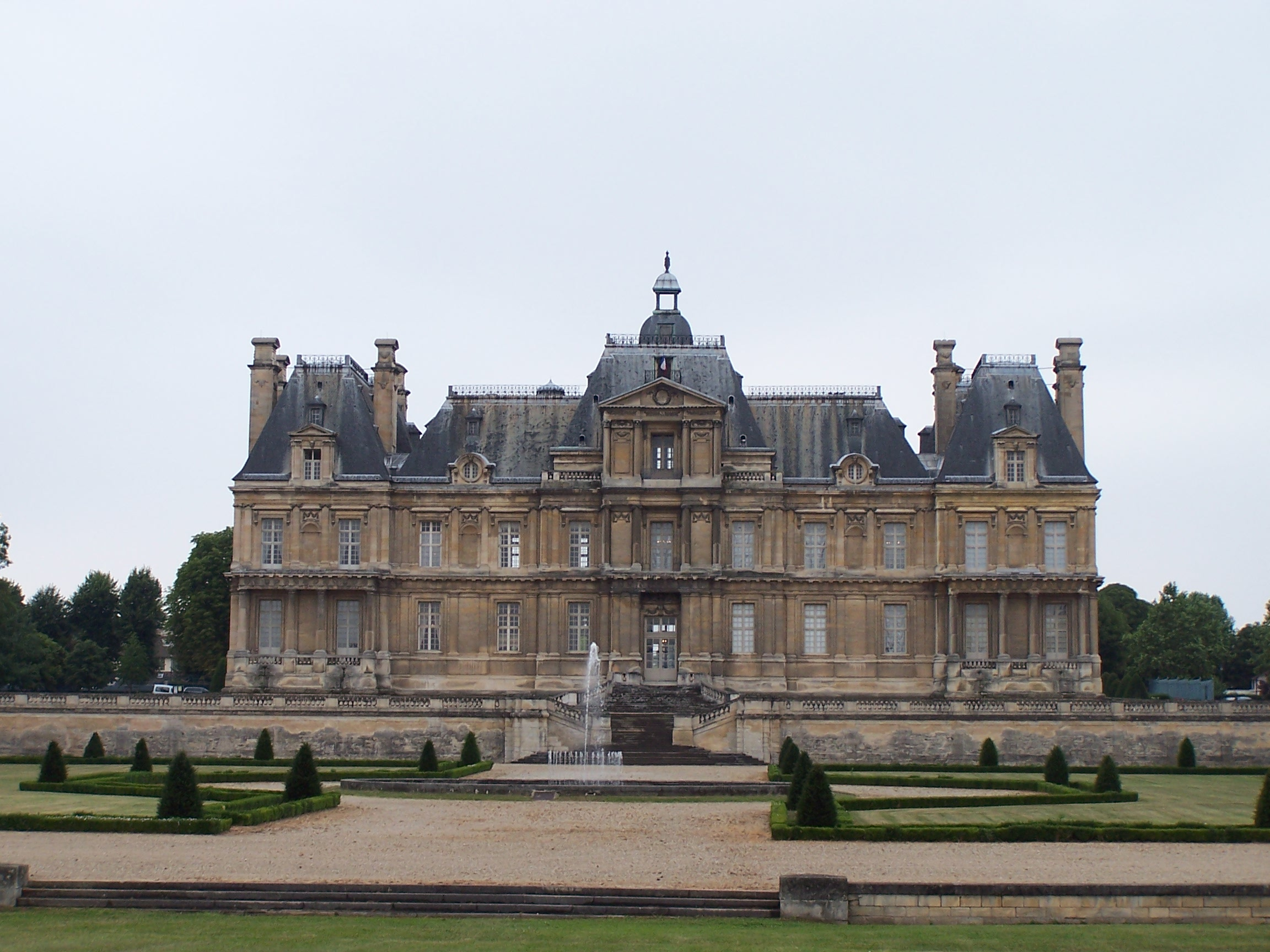
Château de Maisons, a defining work in French architecture

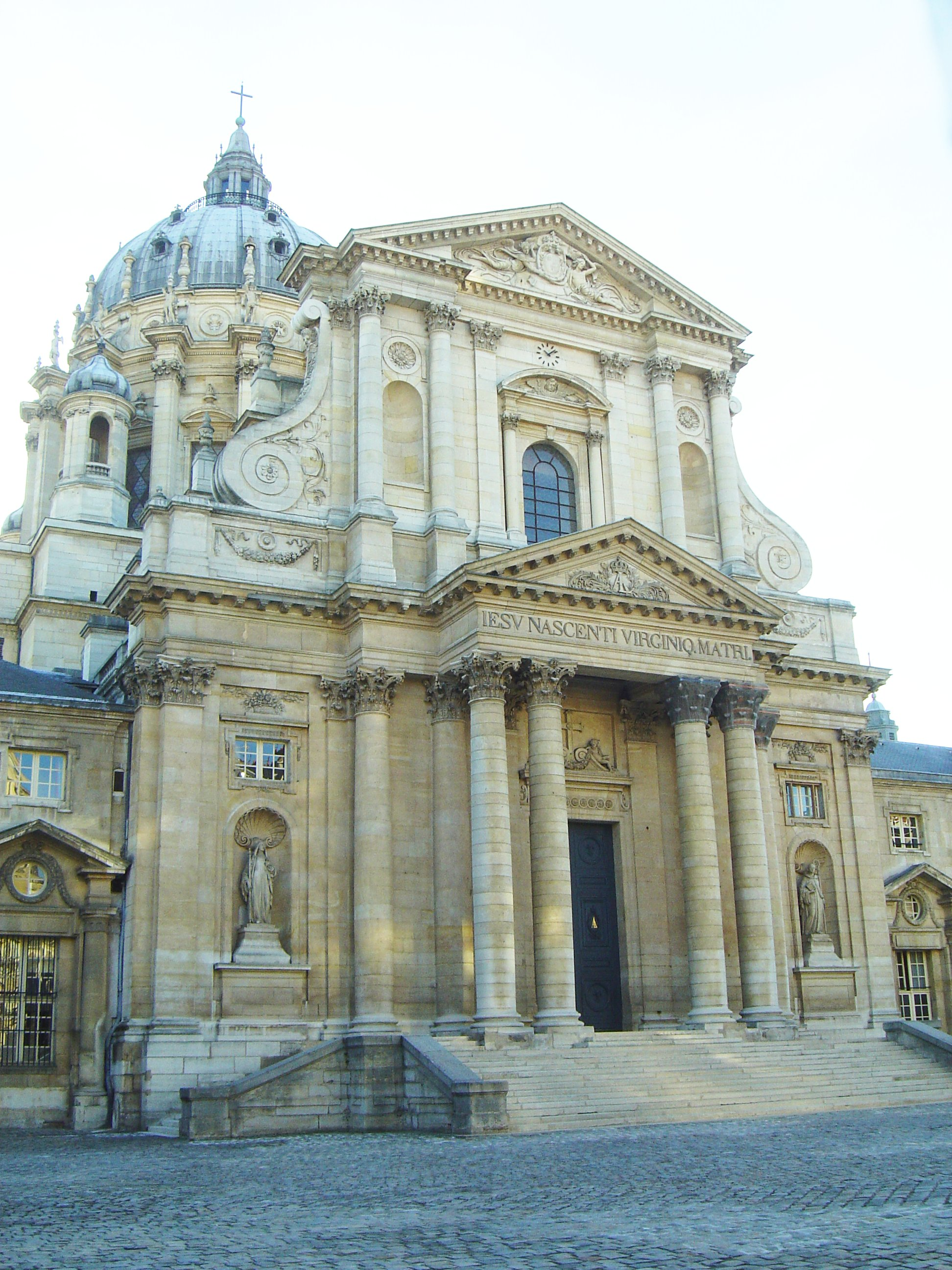
Church of Val-de-Grâce, Paris, built for Anne of Austria
