= Presentation of Christ in the Temple (Vouet) =

Painting by Simon Vouet

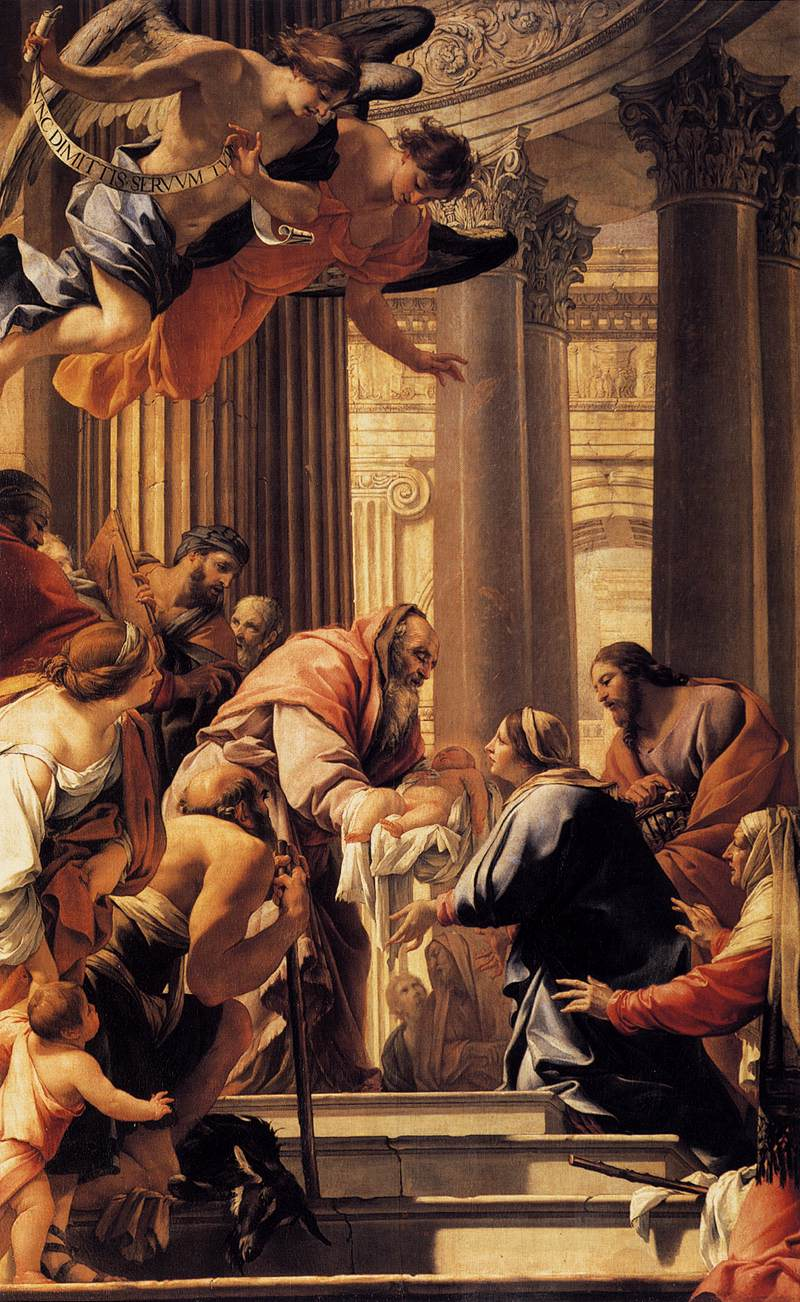
Presentation of Christ in the Temple (c. 1640–1641) by Simon Vouet

Presentation of Christ in the Temple is an oil painting on canvas executed c. 1640–1641 by the French artist Simon Vouet. The painting, which depicts the Biblical story of the Presentation of Christ in the Temple, was commissioned from Vouet by Cardinal Richelieu for the Jesuit church of Saint-Paul-Saint-Louis. The main painting is now in the Louvre, whilst its original upper panel The Apotheosis of St Louis is now in the Musée des beaux-arts de Rouen.

== Sources ==
- http://cartelfr.louvre.fr/cartelfr/visite?srv=car_not_frame&idNotice=1132
