= François Derand =

French architect

François Derand (born between 1588 and 1591, Vic-sur-Seille; died 29 October 1644, Agde) was a French Jesuit architect.

== Life ==
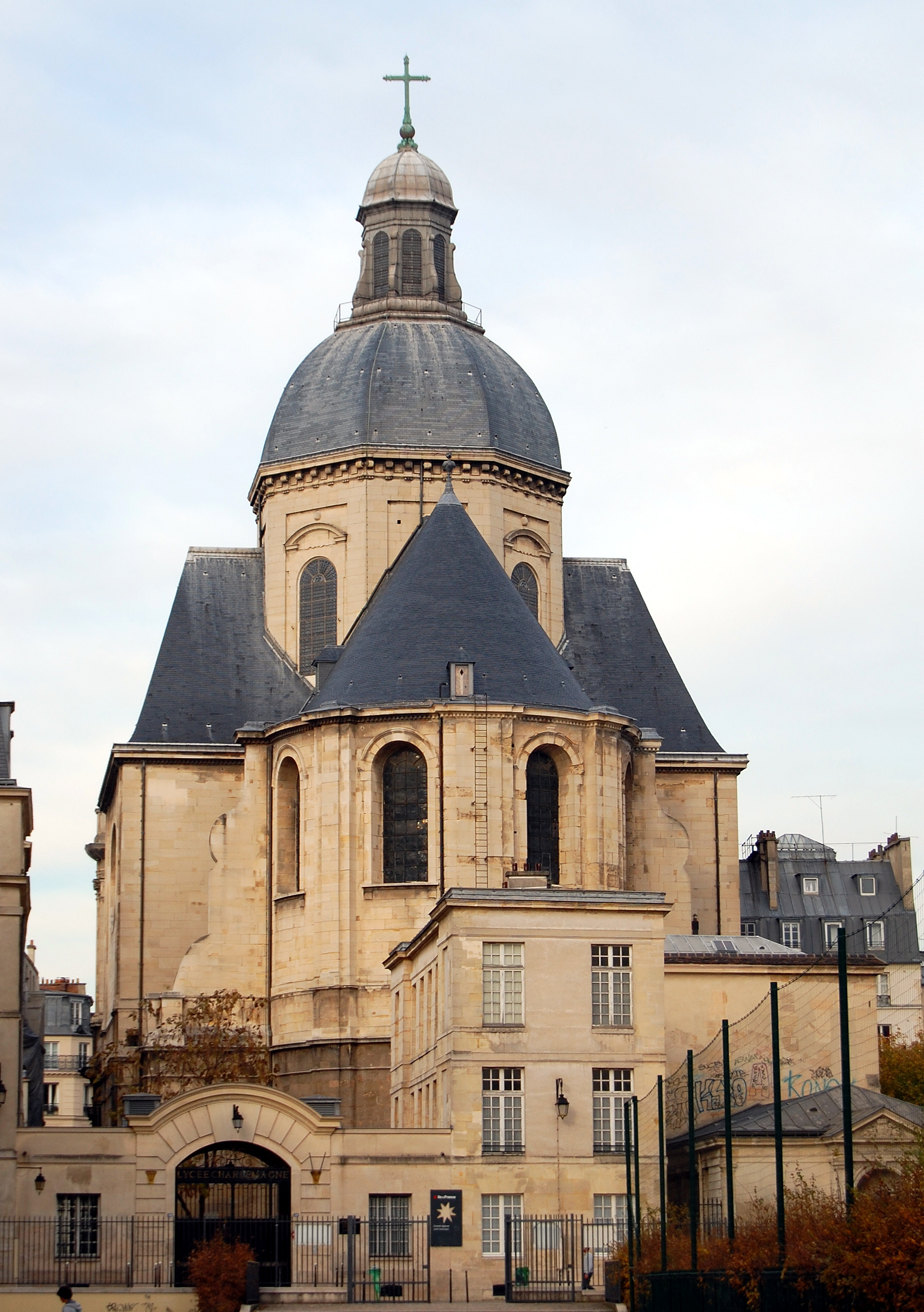
Eglise Saint-Paul-Saint-Louis, Paris IVe

After studying for the noviciate in Rouen, then at the Jesuit college in La Flèche (where he taught maths for two years), he was ordained a priest in 1621 and entered the Society of Jesus. Initially he lived in Rouen then Rennes, where he was consulted on the work to rebuild the Cathédrale Sainte-Croix d'Orléans. In 1629, he moved to complete the Église Saint-Paul-Saint-Louis, begun by Étienne Martellange. He also took part in several other works - the altarpiece of Laval and the high altar of the Jesuit church at La Flèche. In 1643 he published 'L’architecture des voûtes', a treatise on stereotomy that is considered his masterwork. He was summoned to Agde the same year and died there in 1644. He was buried in the Jesuit college at Béziers.

== Sources ==
- Babelon, Jean-Pierre (1996). "Derand, Père François", vol. 8, p. 775, in The Dictionary of Art, 34 volumes, edited by Jane Turner. New York: Grove. ISBN 9781884446009.
- (in French) Pérouse de Montclos, Jean-Marie (2009). Biography of François Derand on Architectura
- (in French) Coupole de Saint-Paul-Saint-Louis on insecula
