= Saint-Paul-Saint-Louis =

Coordinates: 48°51′17″N 2°21′41″E

Église Saint-Paul-Saint-Louis
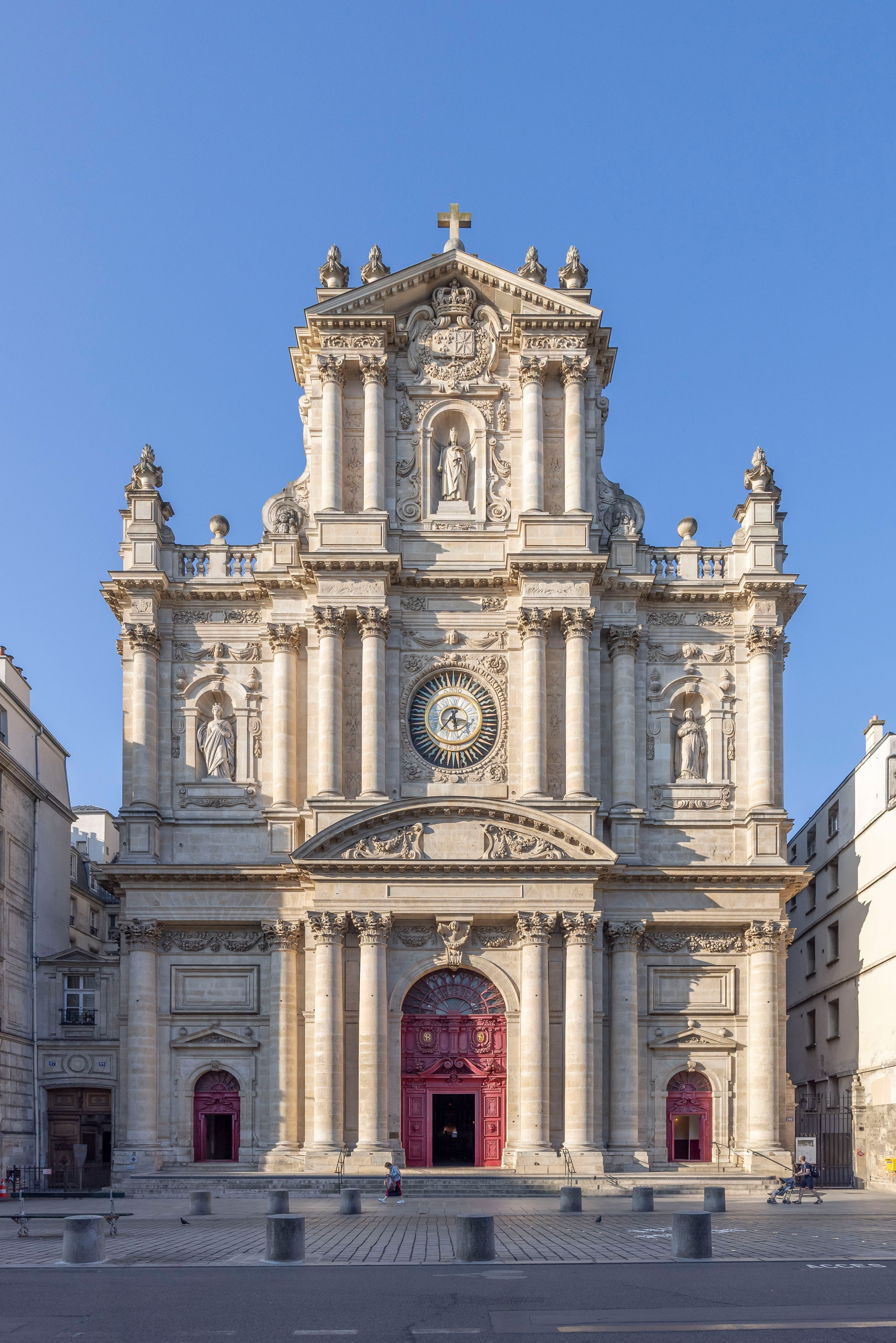
- Église Saint-Paul-Saint-Louis
- Location: Paris
- Country: France
- Denomination: Catholic
- Website: spsl.fr

History
- Former name: Church of Saint Paul
- Consecrated: 9 May 1641

Architecture
- Architect(s): Étienne Martellange and François Derand
- Groundbreaking: 1627
- Completed: 1641

Administration
- Archdiocese: Paris

The Église Saint-Paul-Saint-Louis (French pronunciation: [eɡliz sɛ̃ pɔl sɛ̃ lwi]) is a church on rue Saint-Antoine in the Marais quarter of Paris. The present building was constructed from 1627 to 1641 by the Jesuit architects Étienne and François Derand, on the orders of Louis XIII. It was the first church in Paris to break away entirely from the Gothic style and to use the new Baroque style of the Jesuits, and it had an important influence on Parisian religious architecture. It gives its name to Place Saint-Paul and its nearest Metro station, Saint-Paul. Next door to the church is the Lycée Charlemagne, also founded by the Jesuits.

== History ==
=== First church ===
The first church on the site, Saint-Paul-des-Champs, was dedicated around 1125, when the neighbourhood first became a parish. It was dedicated to Paul the Hermit, a Christian monk in Egypt in the 3rd-4th century. Madame de Sévigné was baptised in the old church in 1626, in the first chapel of Saint-Louis. The chemist Antoine Lavoisier was an important patron of the church, until he was guillotined in 1794 during the French Revolution.

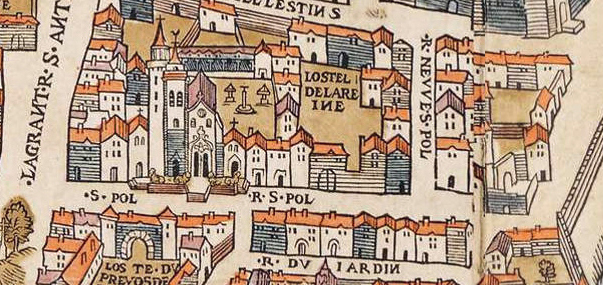
Saint Paul des Champs in c.1550

Behind it was a cemetery, originally connected to the monastery of Saint-Éloi, founded by monks of saint Eloi of Noyon and Dagobert I. The old cemetery behind the church contained the remains of prominent figures, including François Rabelais, and the architect François Mansart. The monastic cemetery disappeared and the old church was demolished in 1799. The dedication to Saint Paul was carried over to the new church, though it was transferred to the more famous Paul of Tarsus, rather than Paul the Hermit. A portion of the old wall still remains, next to the Lycée.

=== 17th century -the new church ===
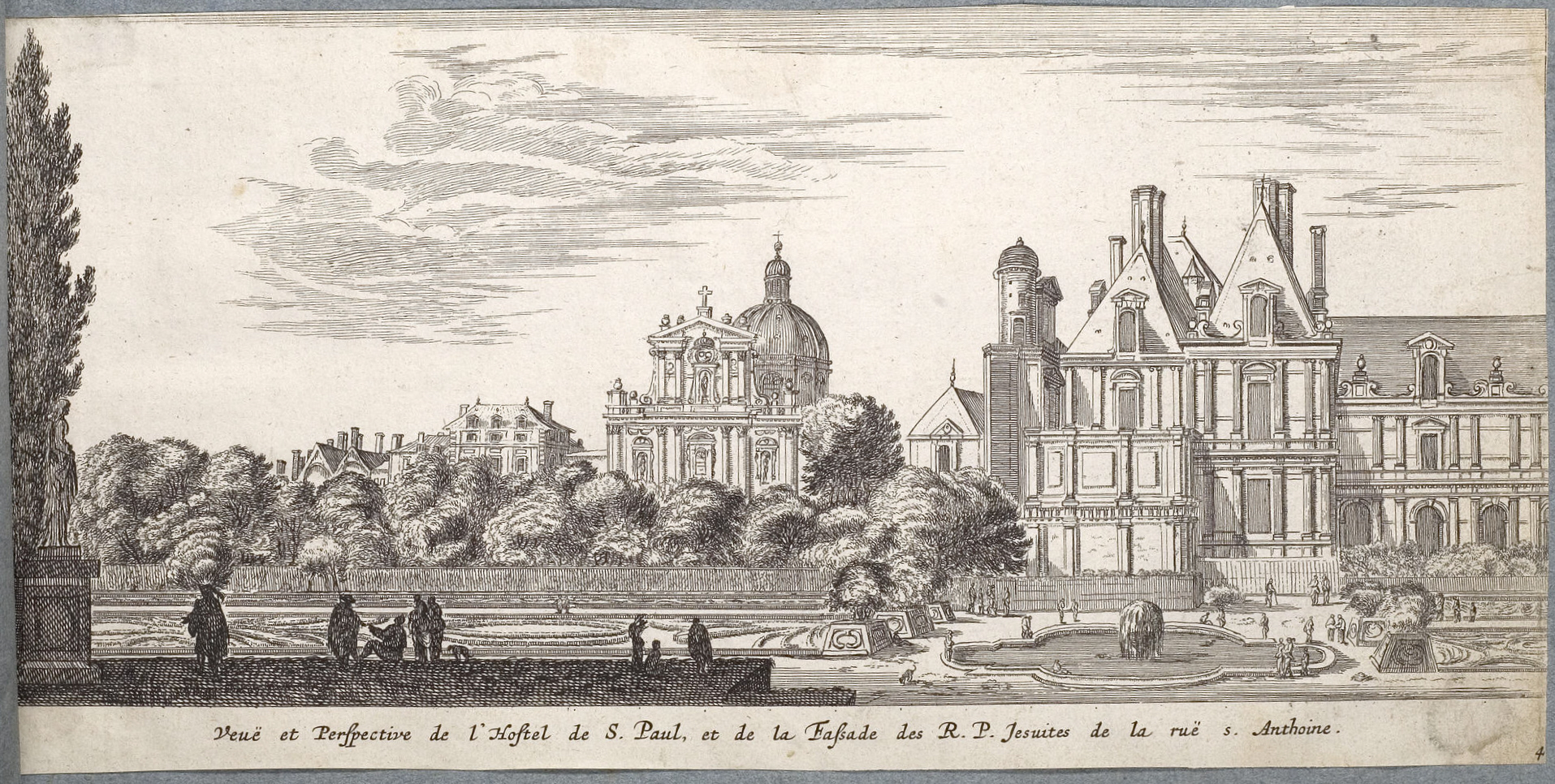
The church and neighbourhood about 1660

In 1580 the Jesuits established their first house in Paris, and constructed a chapel dedicated to Louis IX of France, later known as Saint Louis, close to the present church. As the city grew, this chapel was too small, and it was replaced between 1627 and 1641 with a new church, built with the financial aid of Louis XIII. The first stone of the new building was laid by Louis XIII in 1627. Its original name was 'église Saint-Louis de la maison professe des Jésuites', in reference to the Maison Professe des Jésuites attached to it. The name of his ancestor, Louis IX, was added to the name of the church. The architect of the new church was the Jesuit priest Étienne Martellange. This was a collaboration between Martellange who drew the initial plans and another Jesuit architect, François Derand, who was responsible for the design of the facade. It was the first church in Paris to break away entirely from the Gothic style and to use the new Baroque style. The plan is inspired by the Chiesa del Gesù in Rome.

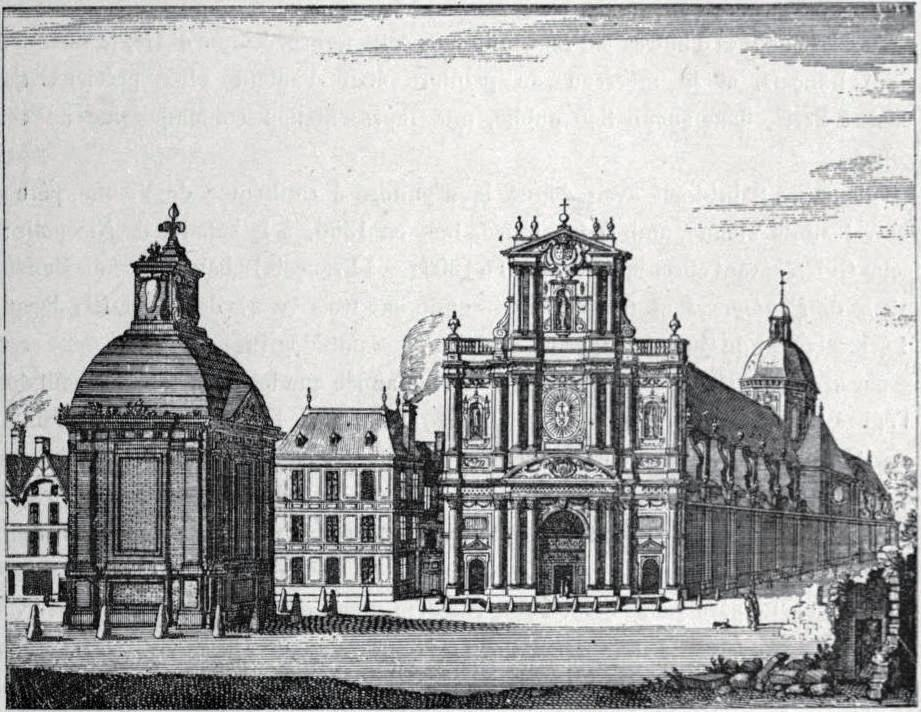
The church in 1679

The first mass was celebrated in the new building on 9 May 1641 (the feast of the Ascension) by Cardinal Richelieu, with the oremuses pronounced by Bossuet. The famous Jesuit preacher Louis Bourdaloue preached some of his memorable sermons in the church, for Lent and Advent, between 1669 and 1693. He also preached a funeral sermon for the Grand Condé in the church in 1687. Esprit Fléchier also preached here.

The new church became famous for its music; the musical directors included Marc-Antoine Charpentier et Jean-Philippe Rameau.

The Jesuit priests became the confessors or "directors of conscience" of the Kings of France. Jean-Jacques Olier (founder of the Prêtres de Saint-Sulpice) was baptised in the church on 20 September 1608 and Louis Bourdaloue is buried in the church's crypt. Between 1688 and 1698, Marc-Antoine Charpentier was employed by the Jesuits and was master of music in the church of Saint-Paul-Saint-Louis. Other masters of music there included André Campra and Louis Marchand. Jacques de Létin painted The Death of Saint Louis for the church, which can still be seen here.

=== 18th-19th century ===
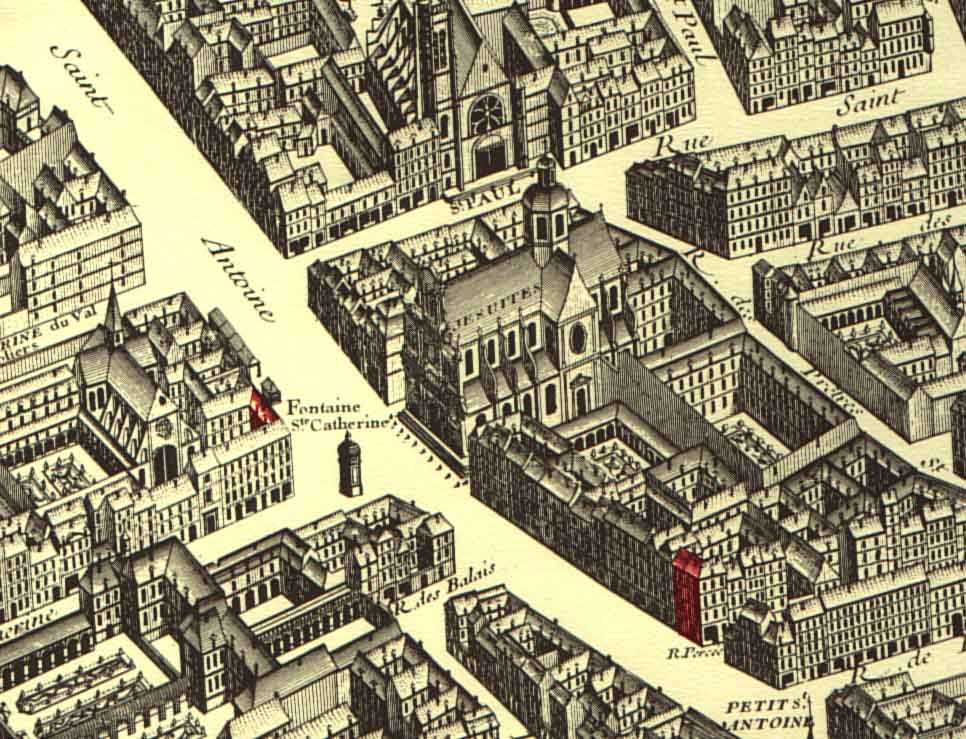
Église Saint-Paul-Saint-Louis on the 1734 plan de Turgot

In 1762, after a dispute with the King, the Jesuits were expelled from France by the Parlement of Paris. The church was transferred to another religious order, the Congregation of France, or Génofévains, whose headquarters was at the Abbey of Saint Genevieve. The church continued to have a close relationship with the royal family; the urns containing the hearts of Louis XIII and Louis XIV were kept in the church. The urns were hidden during the French Revolution, and afterwards were transferred to the Abbey of Saint Denis, where they are found today.

During the French Revolution, on 2 September 1792, 5 priests were killed in the church during the September Massacres. They are commemorated with a plaque. The church was closed and turned into a storehouse and a temple of the Cult of Reason and the Supreme Being, before being restored to Catholicism in 1802 under the Concordat of 1801.

Delacroix painted Christ in agony on the Mount of Olives for the church, which until recently could be seen to the left of the altar. The church is currently displaying a placeholder as the original is on a long-term loan to the Metropolitan Museum of Art in New York City. The church also displays La vierge del Douleur by Germain Pilon (1586). On one pillar on the right side of the nave is a nearly-erased inscription 'République française ou la mort' (French Republic or death), probably dating to the Paris Commune of 1871.

== Exterior ==
The façade was clearly influenced by the new Italian baroque style, particularly the Church of the Gesù in Rome, the mother church of the Jesuit order, but it also had a major influence closer to home; the 1618 façade of the église Saint-Gervais-Saint-Protais de Paris by Salomon de Brosse, which has the same design of three bays with two levels on the side bays and three levels for the central bay, highlighted by a projection and doubled columns.

It uses Corinthian columns on the two lower levels and composite order. The dome was an unusual feature for a Jesuit building; both the dome and bell tower, fifty-five meters high, are largely hidden from view from the street by the very high façade. Another notable influence was the Flemish Baroque style, more lavish than the Italian style, seen in the abundance of sculpture and ornament covering the façade.

The dome of the church is 55 meters high, and was one of the first to be constructed in Paris. It served as a model for other domes, including those of Les Invalides and Val-de-Grace.

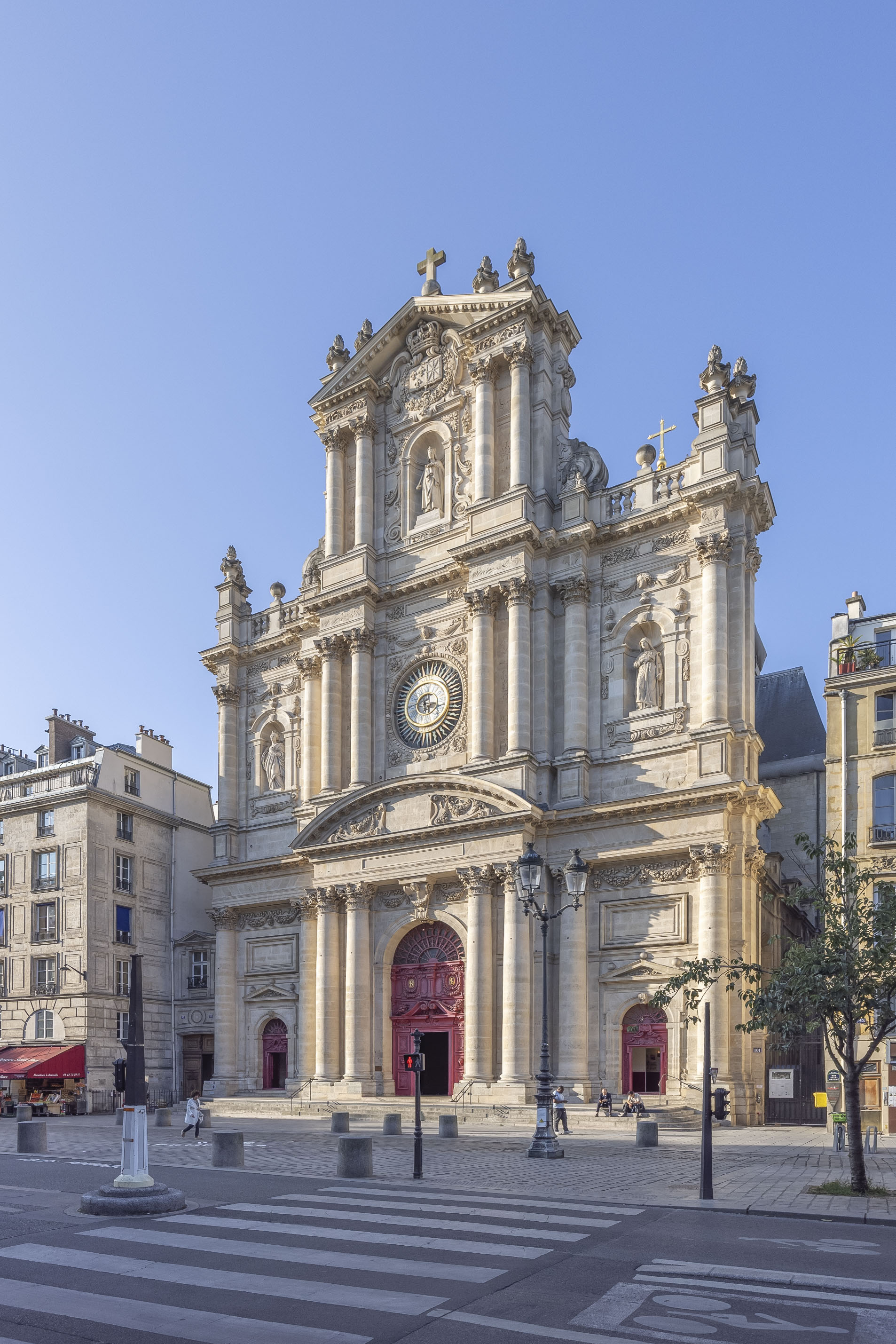
The north façade seen from the rue de Rivoli

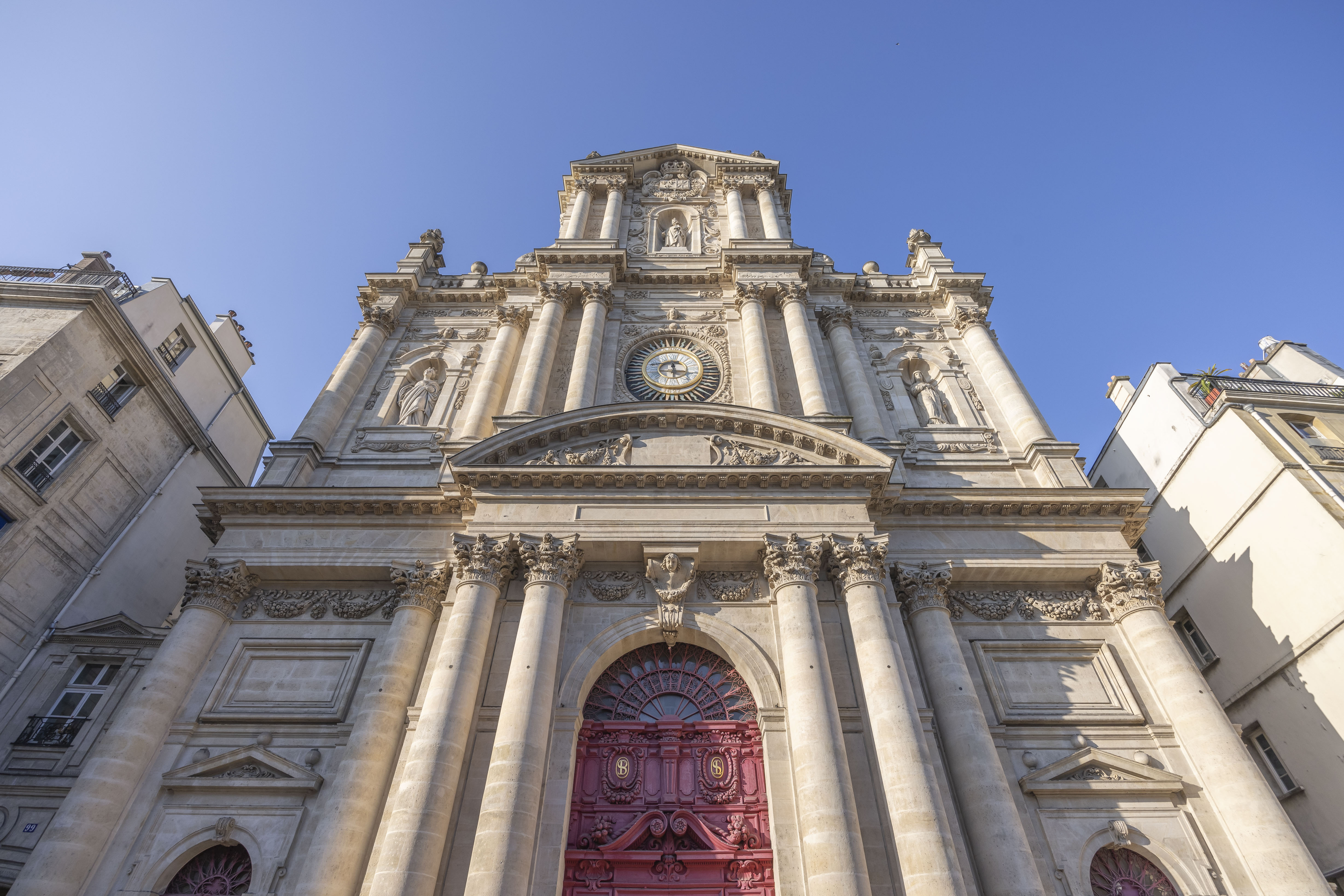
The facade viewed from below

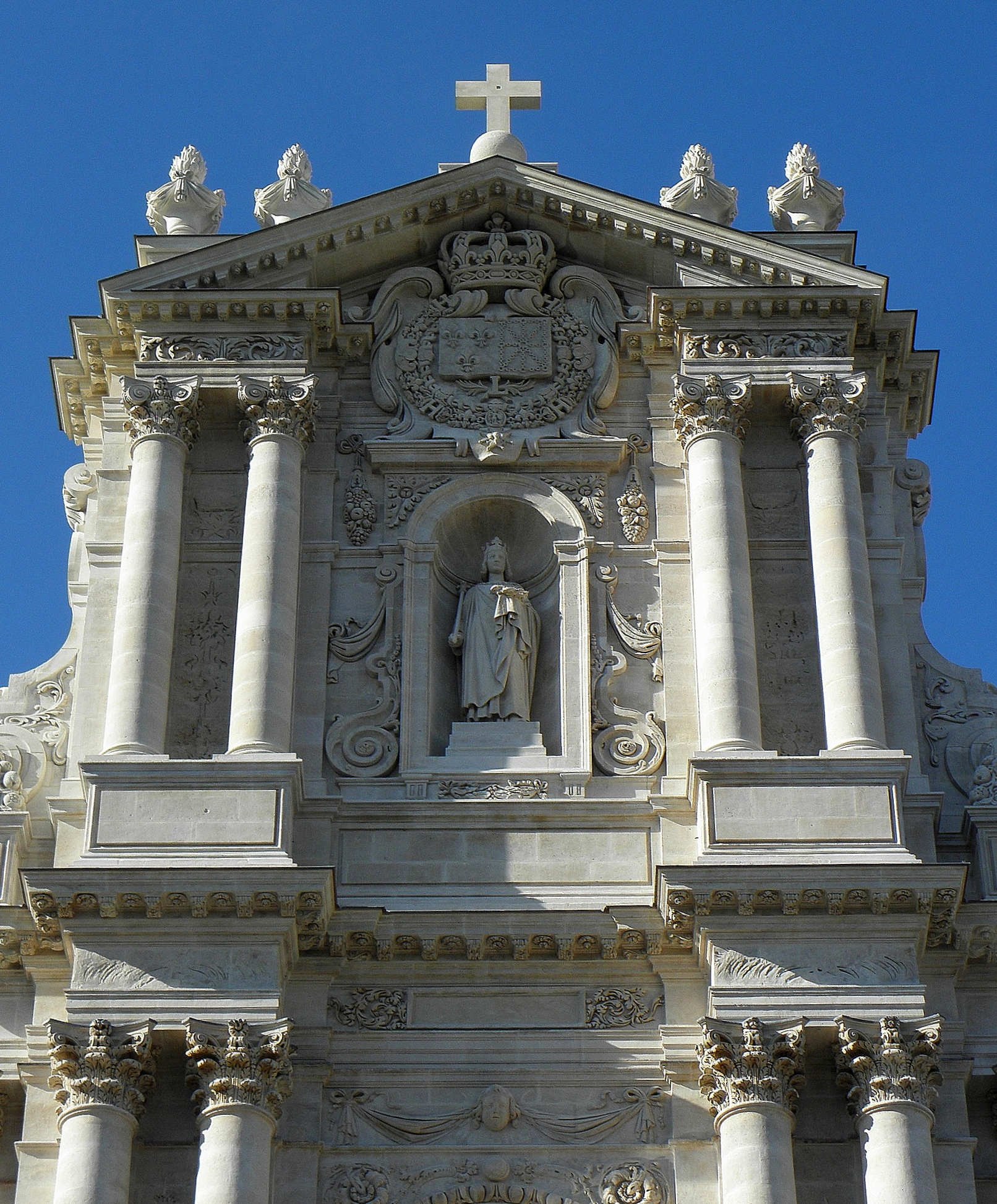
Detail of the upper north façade

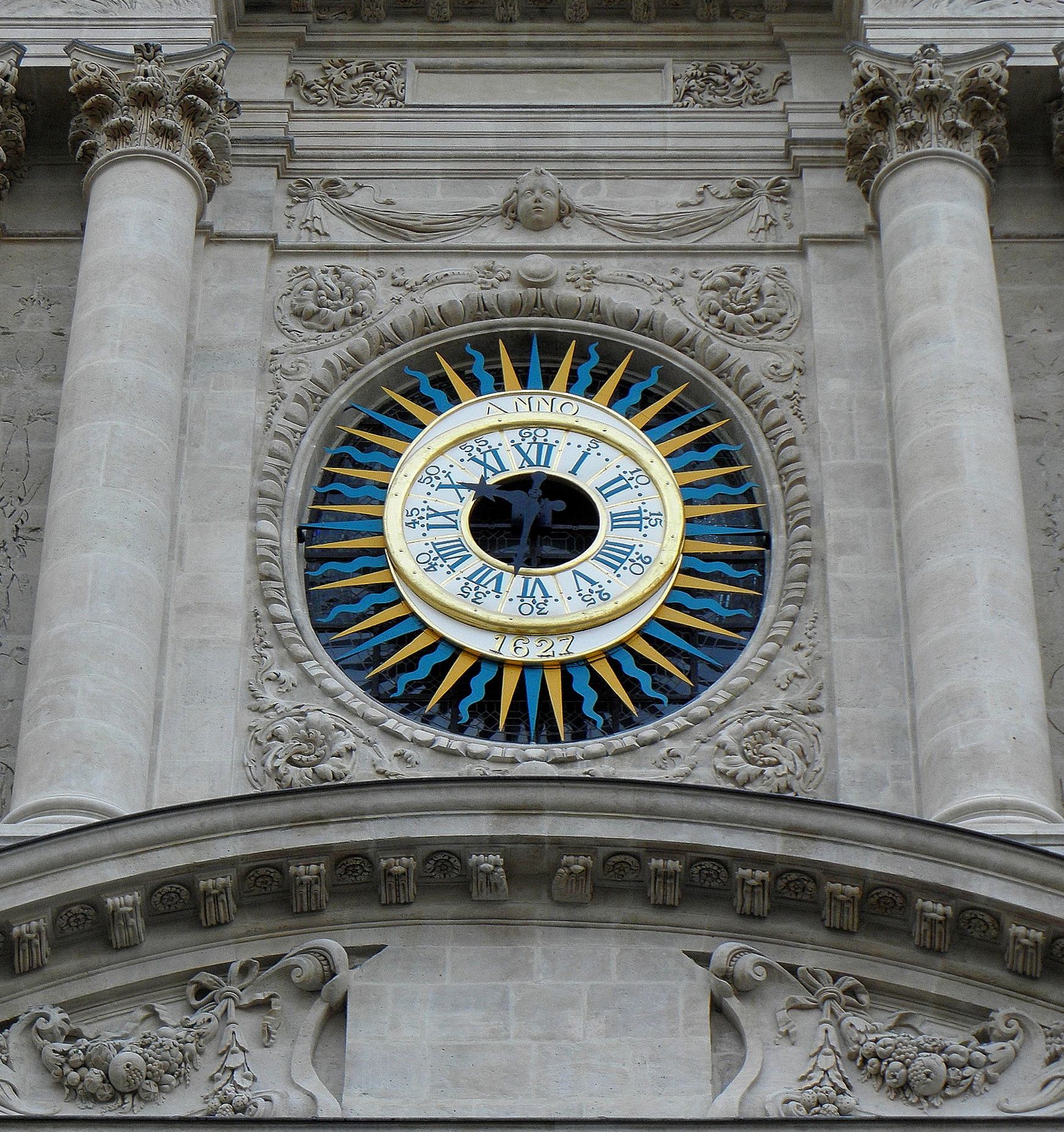
The clock at the center of the facade

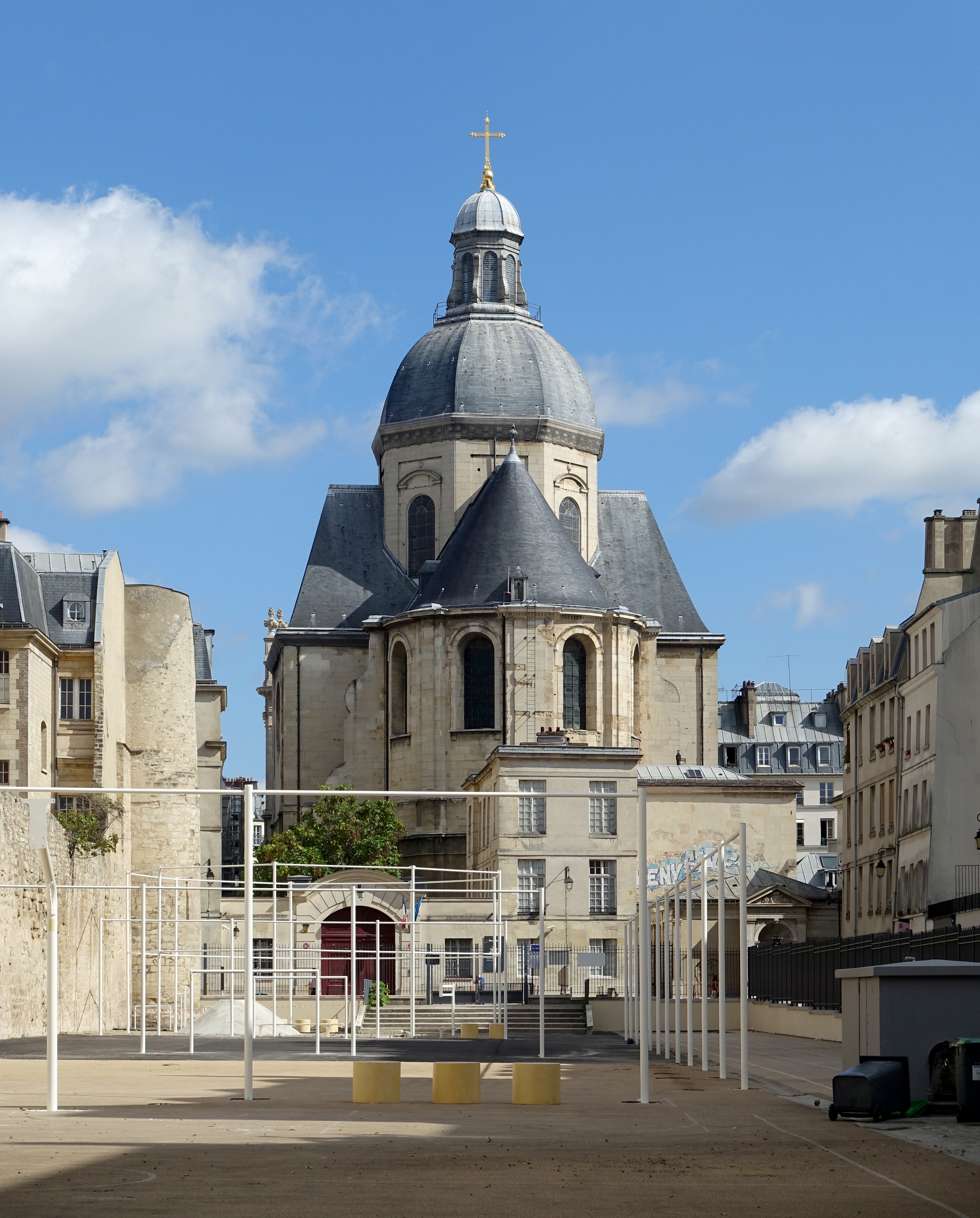
View of the apse and dome from the south

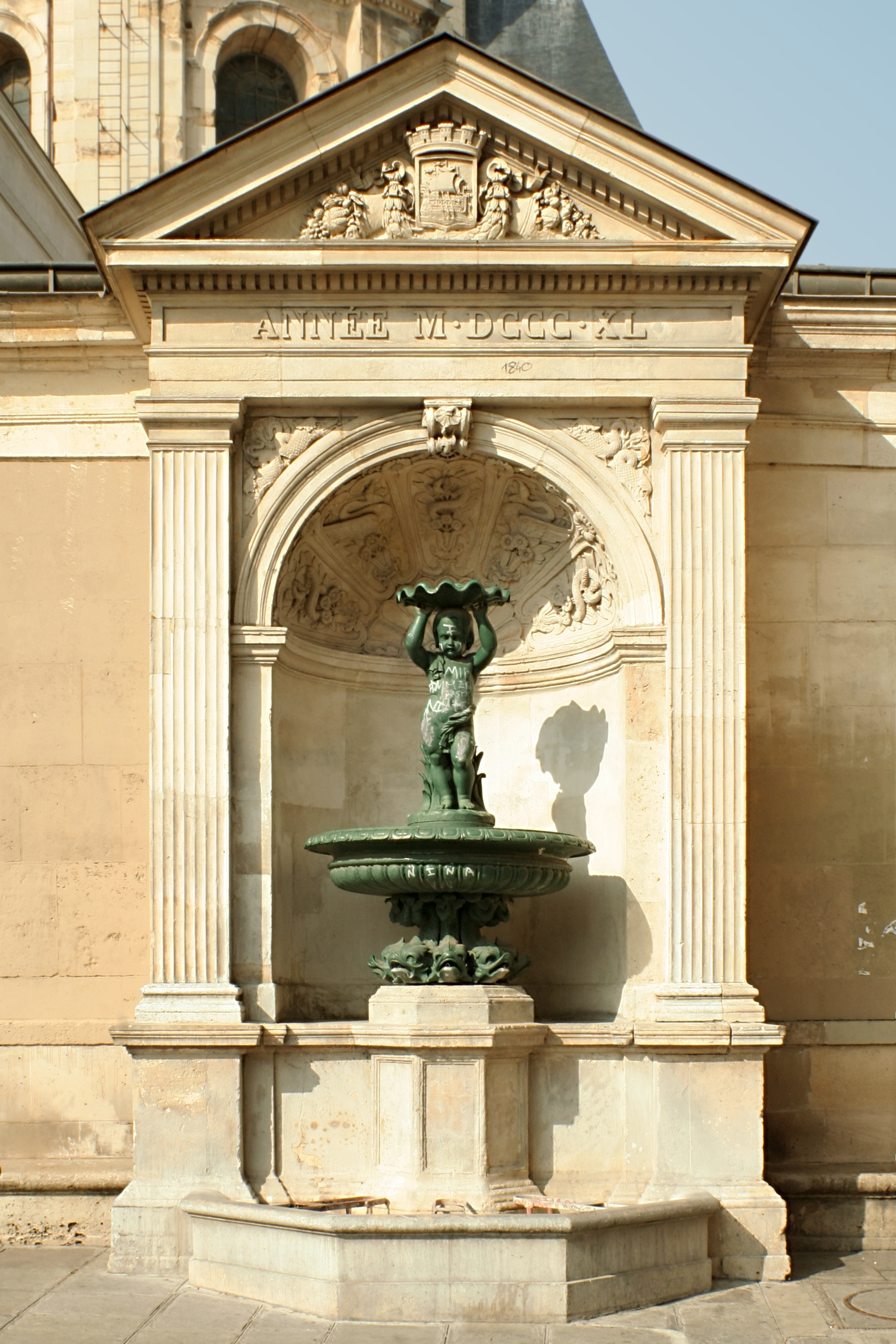
The Charlemagne Fountain, at the south end of the church

== Interior ==
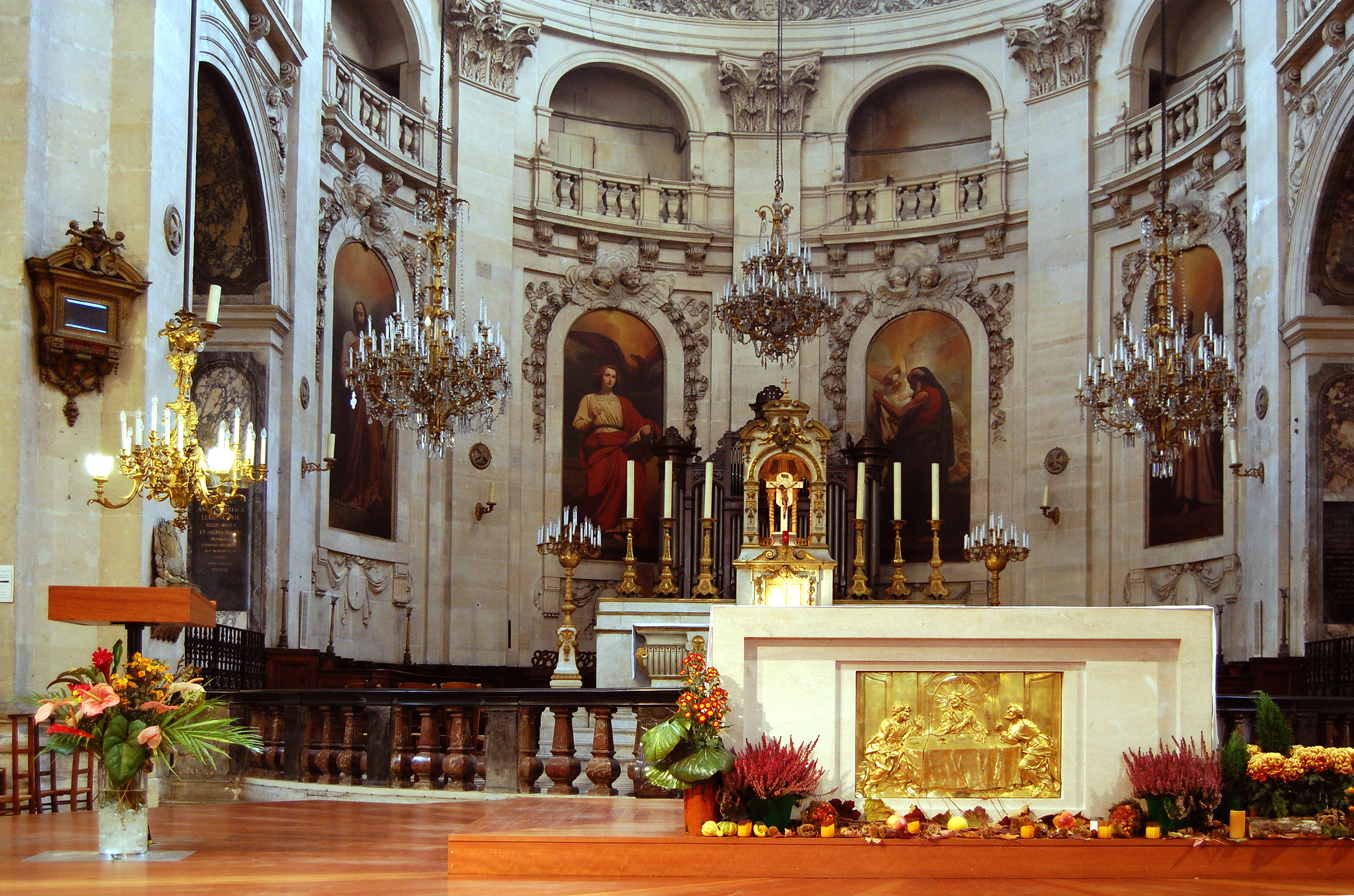
The altar

The interior design was largely inspired by the Church of the Gesù in Rome, with some French additions. The lavish decoration, decreed by the Council of Trent (1545-1563), was intended to contrast with the austere churches of the Protestants, with every element intended to elevate the meditation of the faithful. Following the doctrines of the Jesuits, the decoration also contained numerous symbols and sculptures of the Virgin Mary.

The architectural historian André Chastel wrote: "the Jesuit order, even while recommending certain aspects, was attentive to local traditions." Its plan is a compromise between the Gesu's single nave flanked by side chapels and the traditional French cruciform plan, as seen in its long transepts. The tall windows in these prominent transepts and the short eastern apse allow in large amounts of light, and the dome under the crossing also recalls Italian architecture of a slightly earlier period, such as that of Carlo Maderno.

The white marble high altar was moved and rebuilt under Louis Philippe I with fragments from Napoleon's tomb at Les Invalides. On 14 February 1843, Léopoldine Hugo secretly married Charles Vacquerie in the church. At the entrance of the church are the two clam-shell holy water vessels, donated by her father Victor Hugo to mark the occasion of the baptism of his first child. They are still to be seen in the church. Seven months later Leopoldine was drowned when their boat overturned on the Seine, and her husband drowned trying to save her.

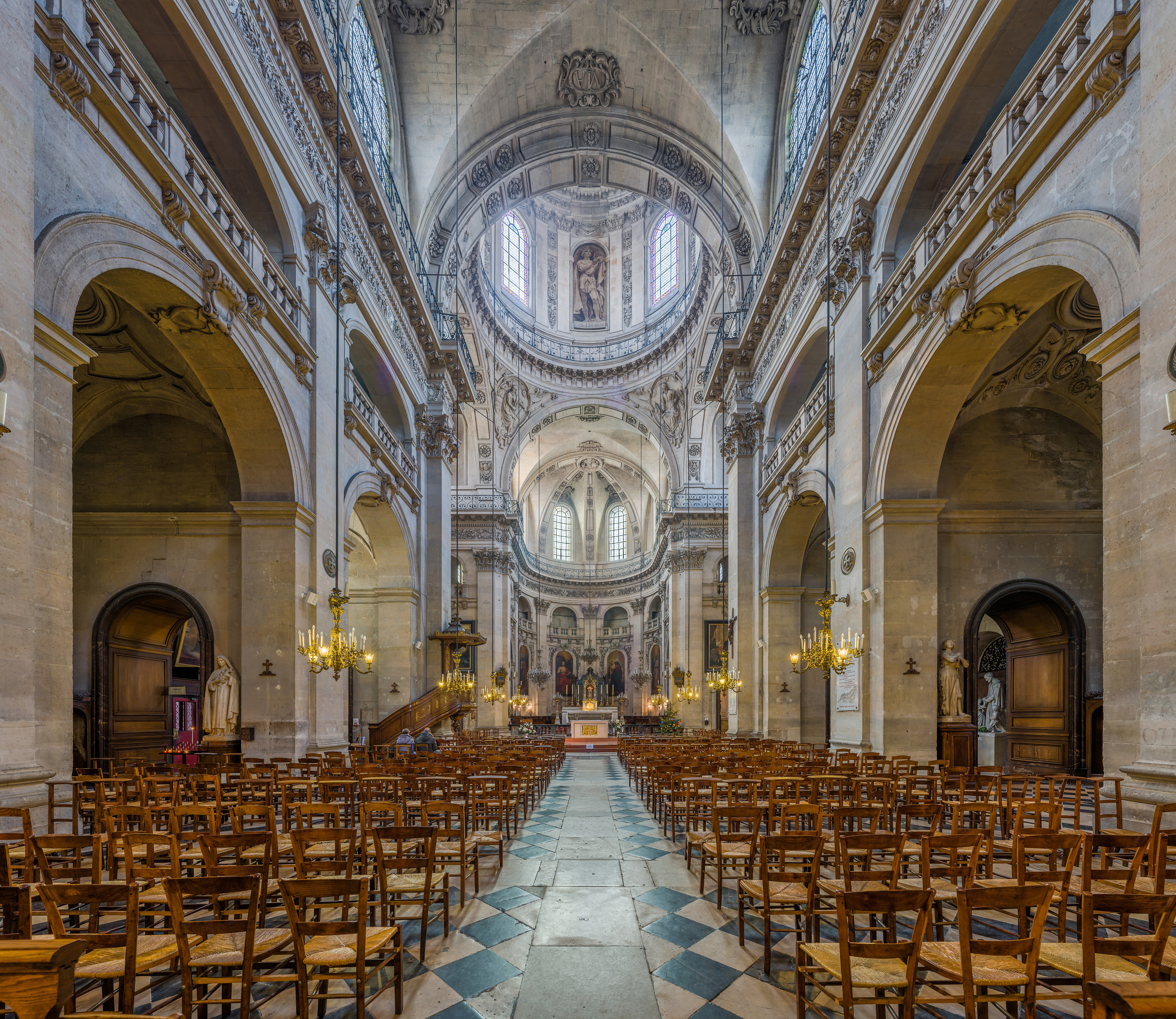
The nave, facing the altar

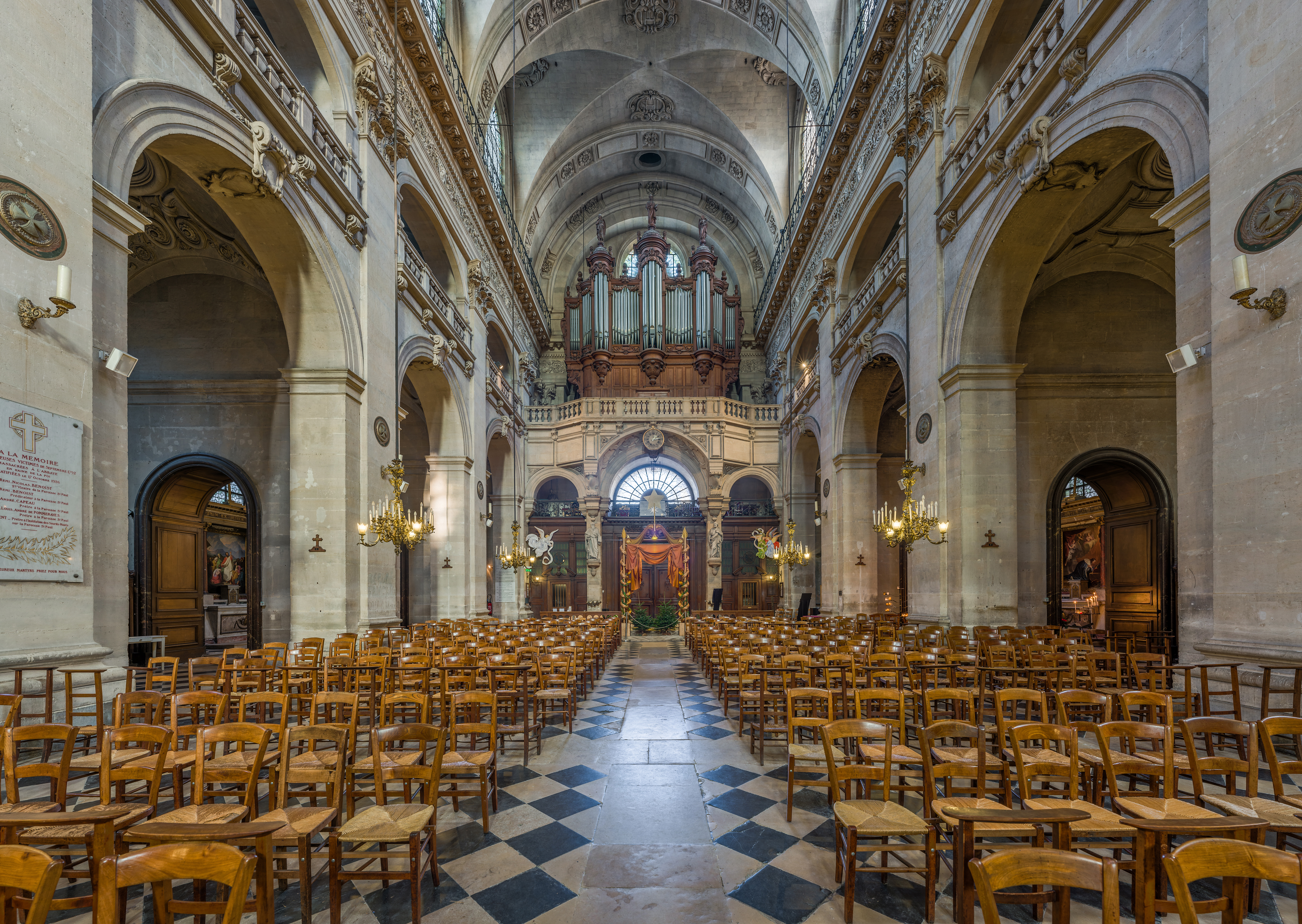
The nave, towards the organ and main entrance

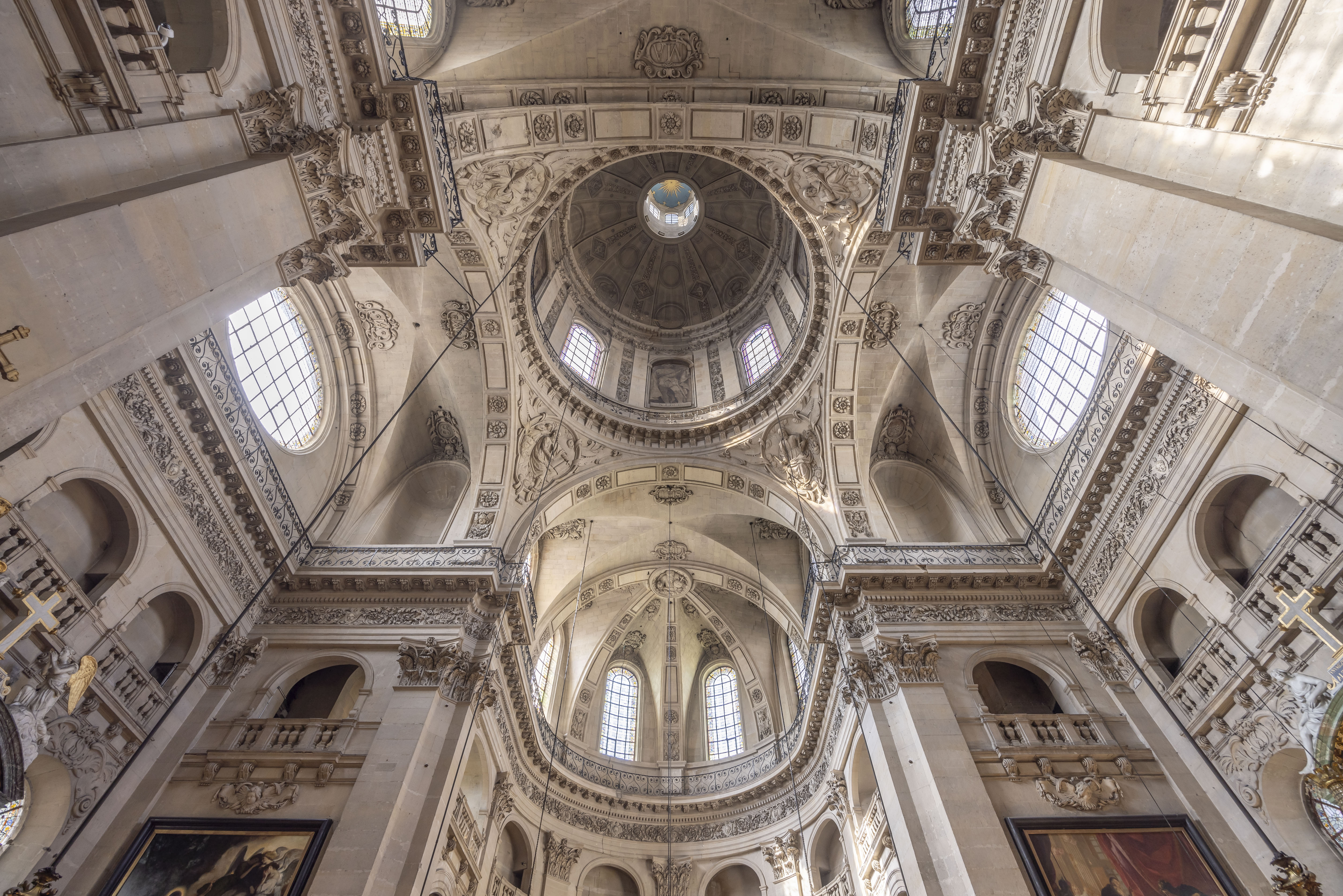
The dome and the apse

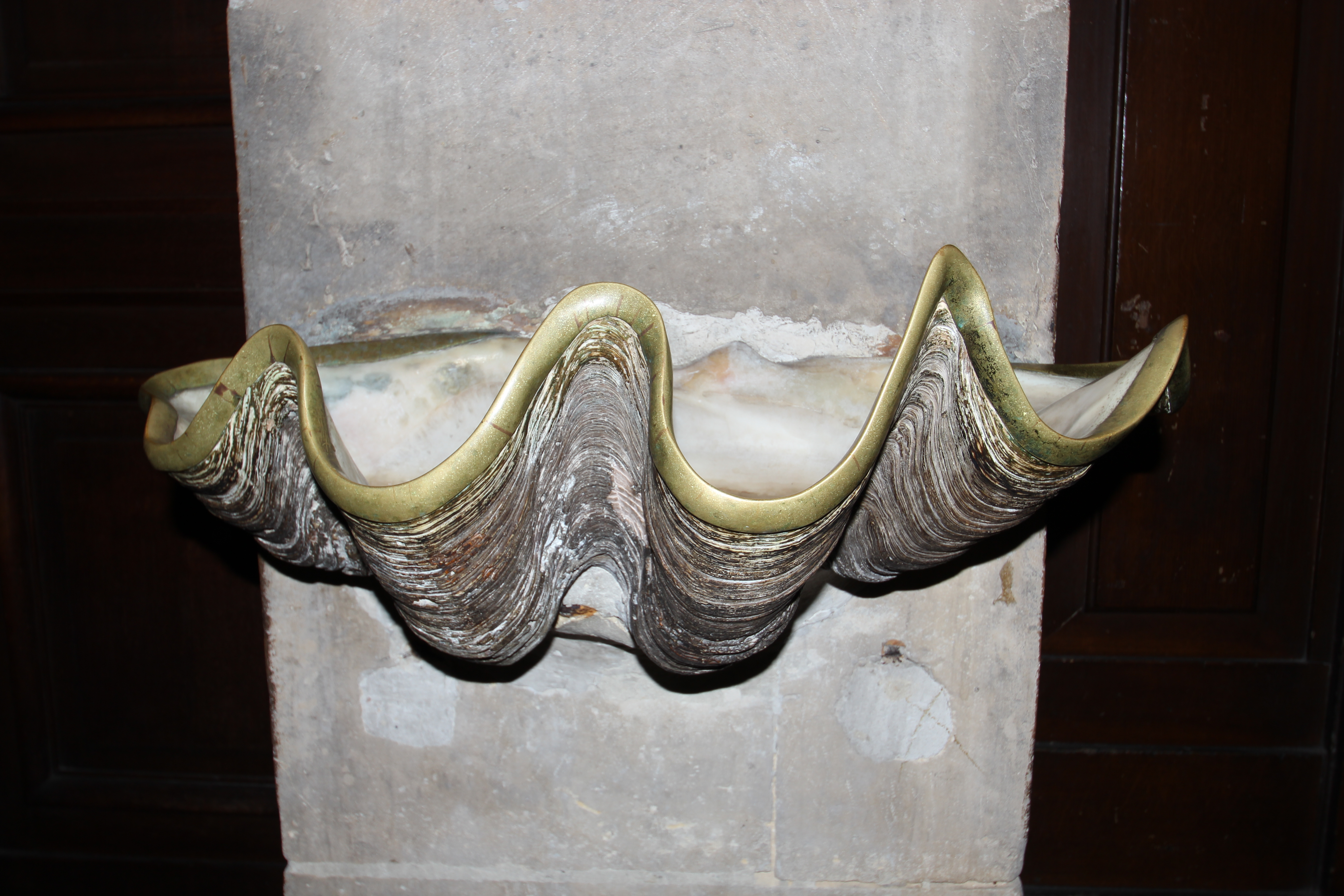
Seashell benetier donated by Victor Hugo

== Art and Decoration ==
=== Stained glass ===
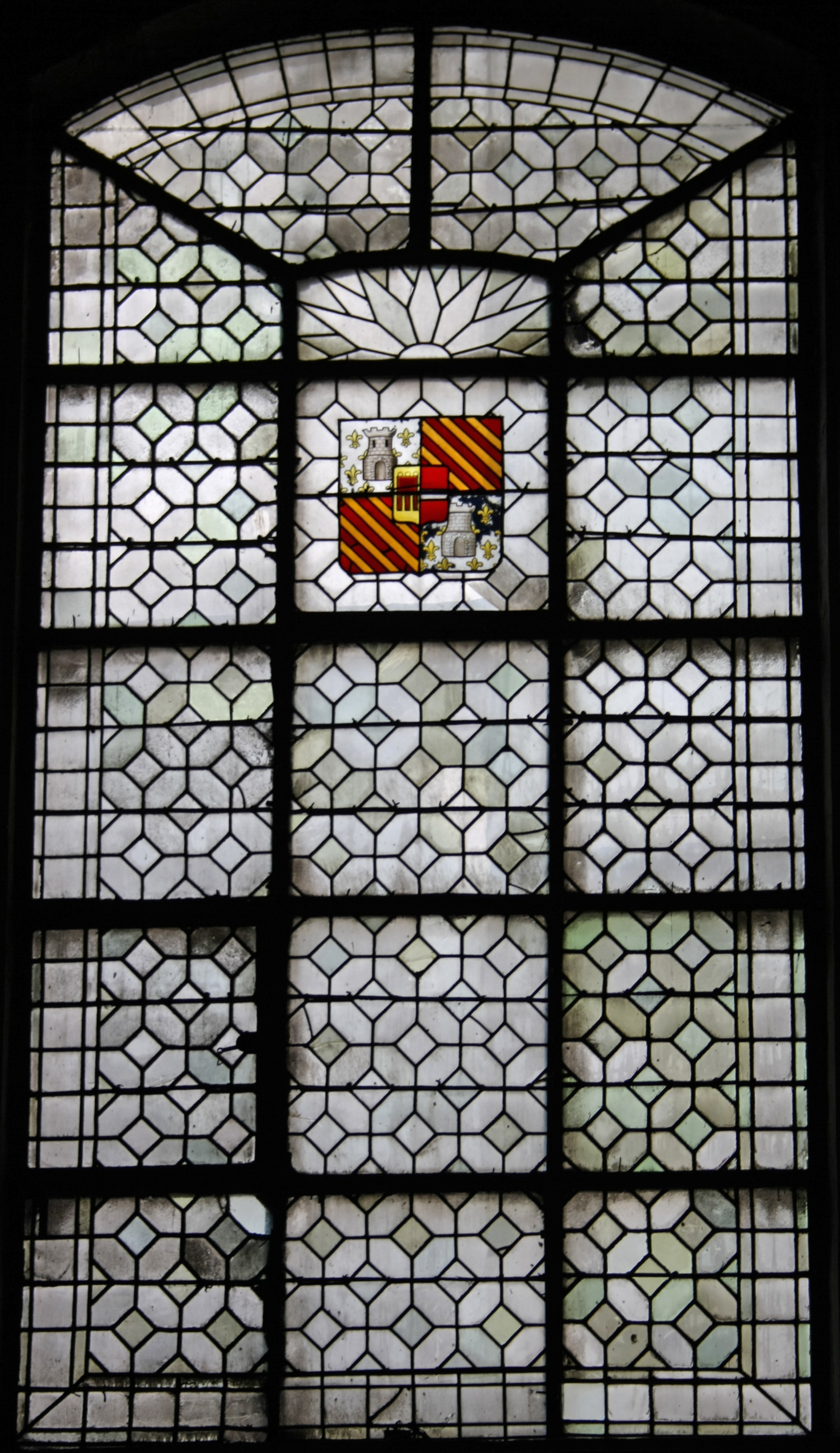
white stained glass to maximize light

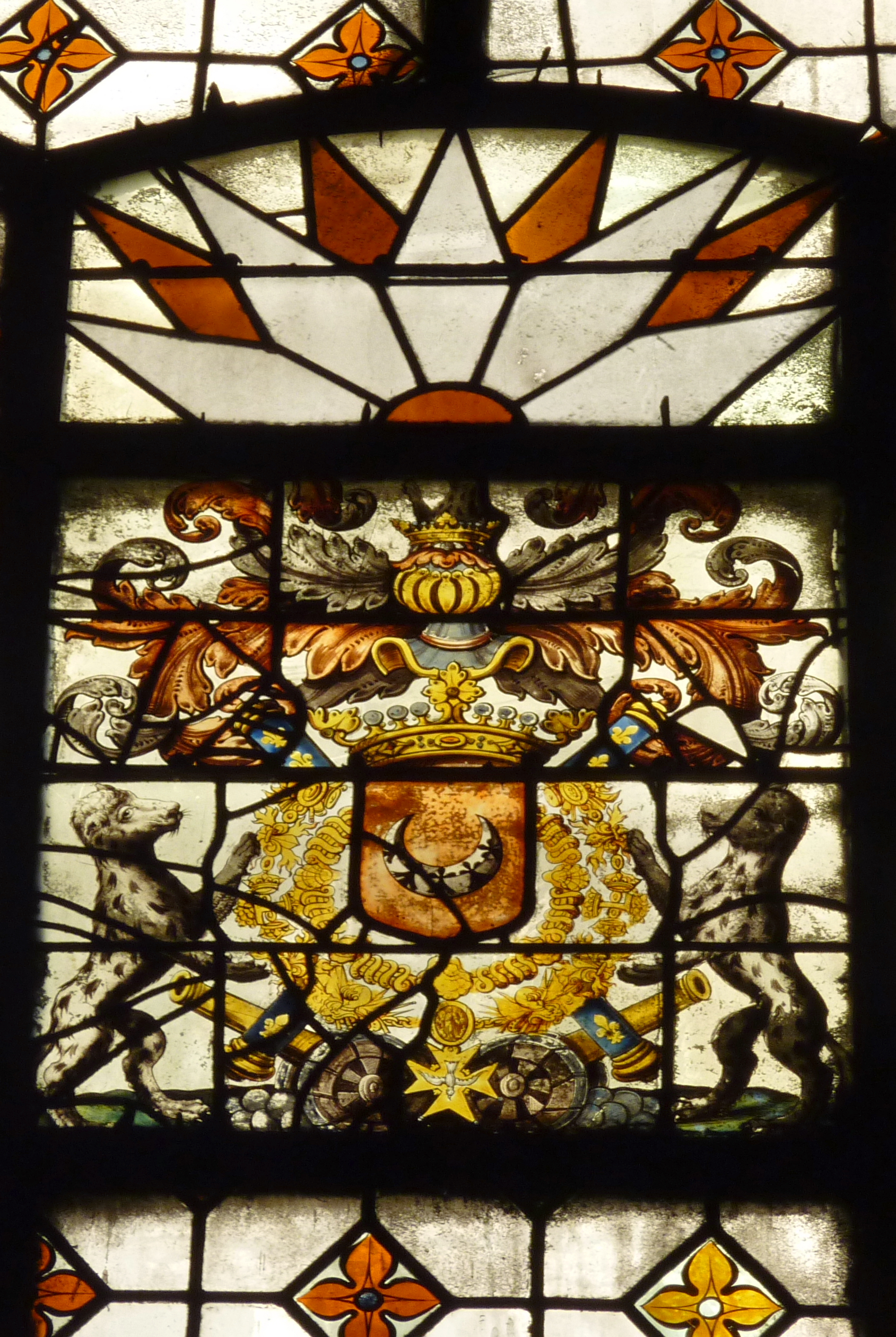
Coat of arms of the De la Porte family

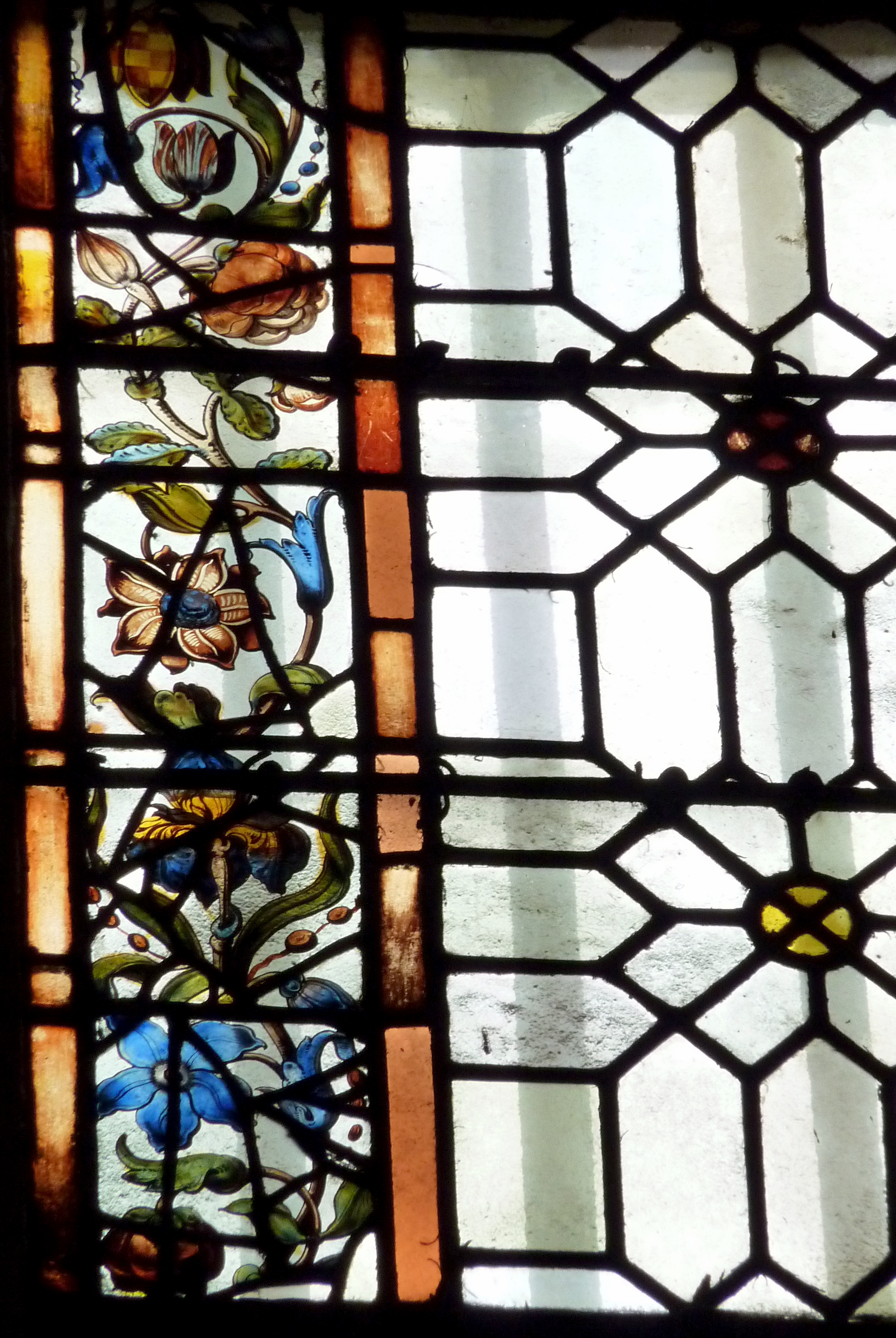
Detail of the stained glass

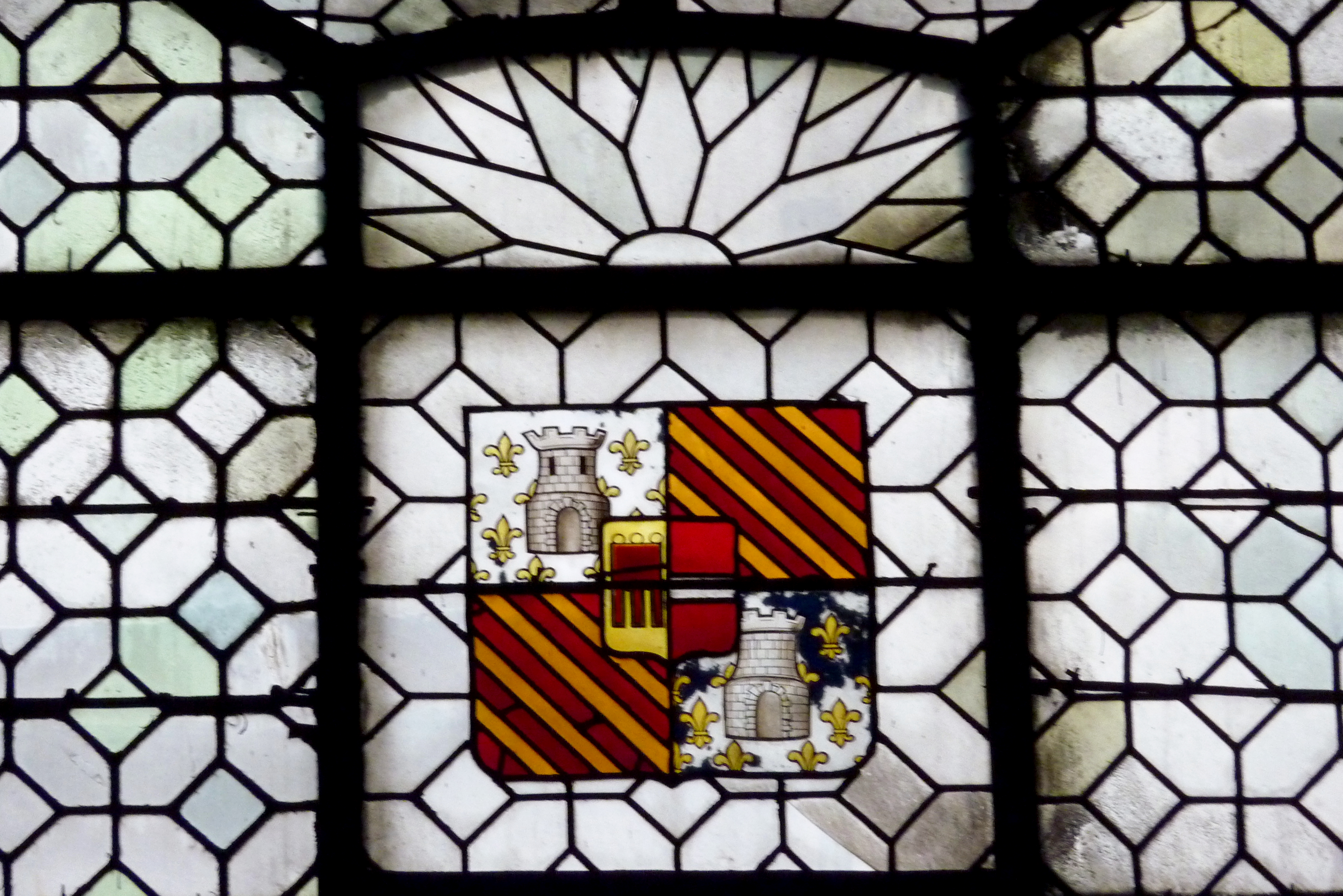

Following the Baroque fashion, most of the stained glass in the windows was white, to bring a maximum of light into the church. Many of the windows were decorated with the coat-of-arms of the family that donated the window

=== Sculpture ===
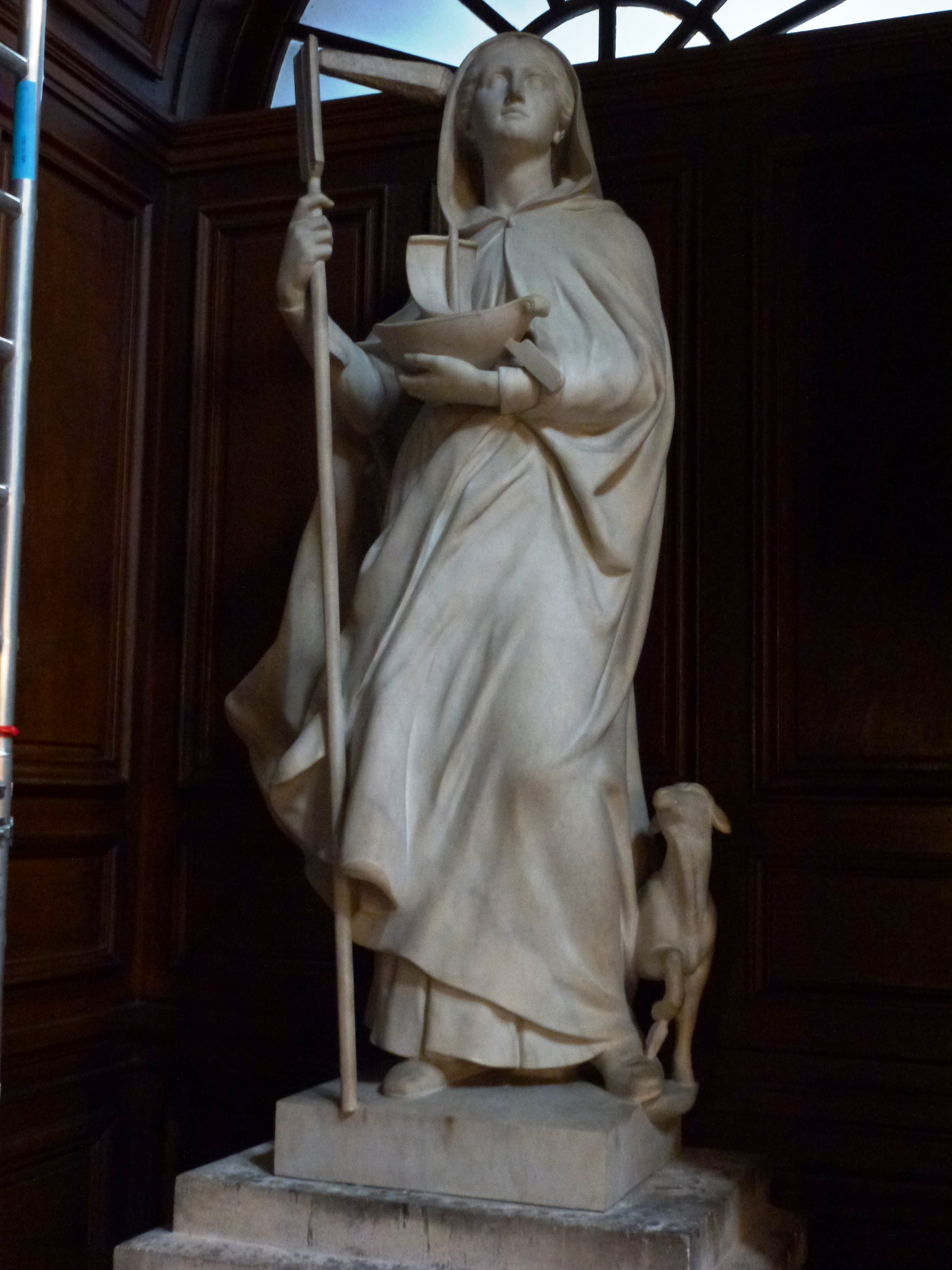
"Saint Genevieve" on north façade

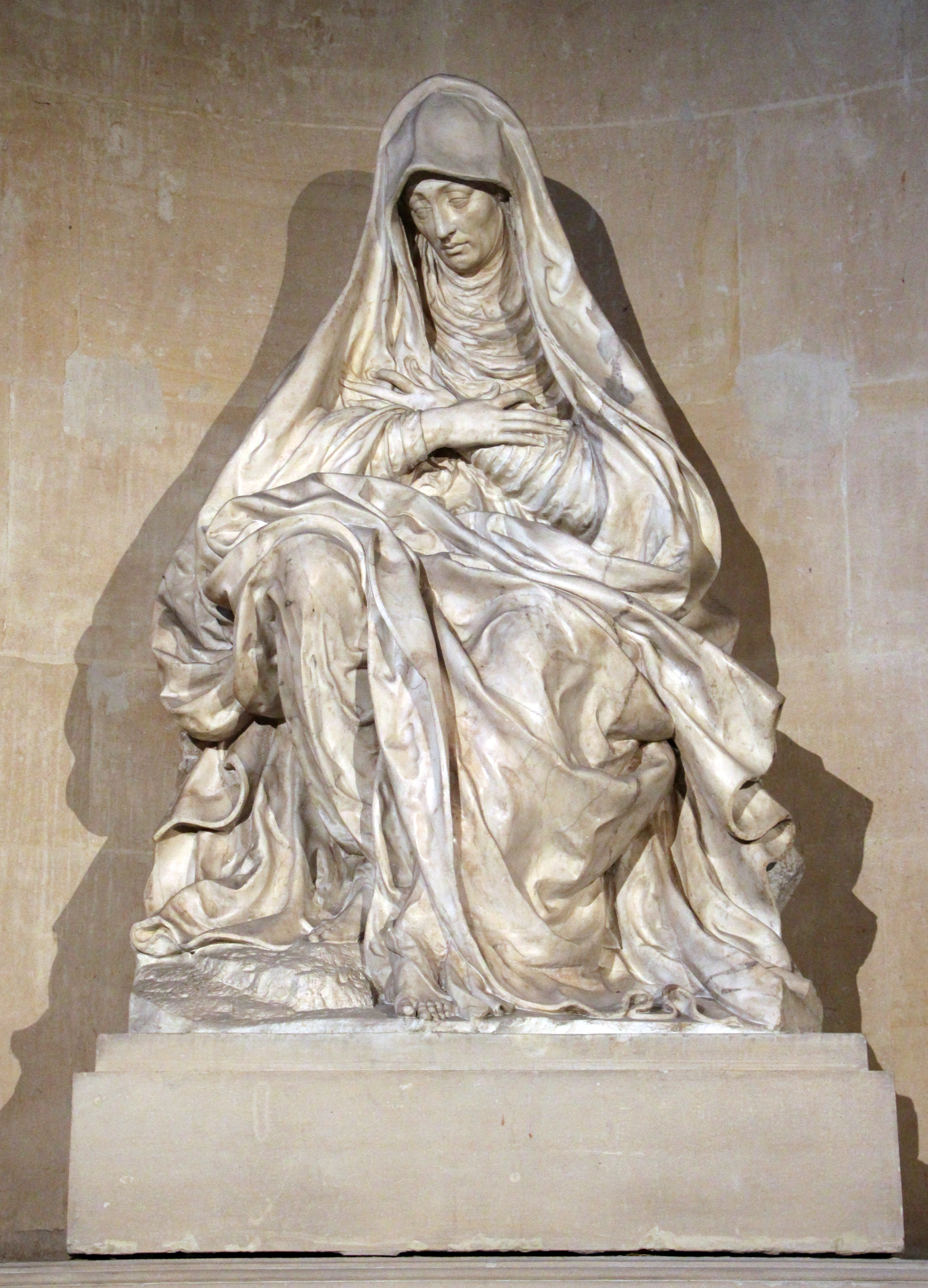
"The Virgin of Sorrow" by Germain Pilon (1588)

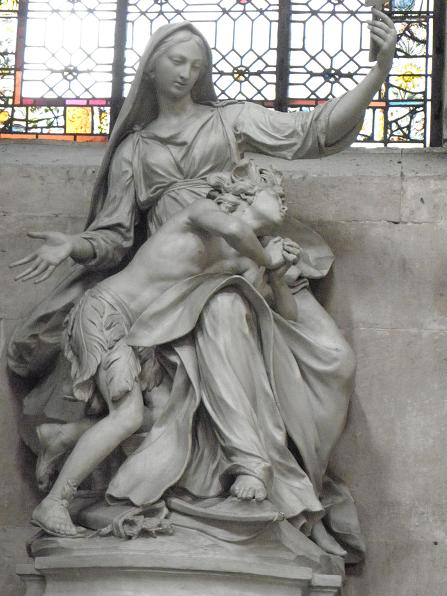
"Religion instructing an Indian", by Nicolas-Sébastien Adam (1745)

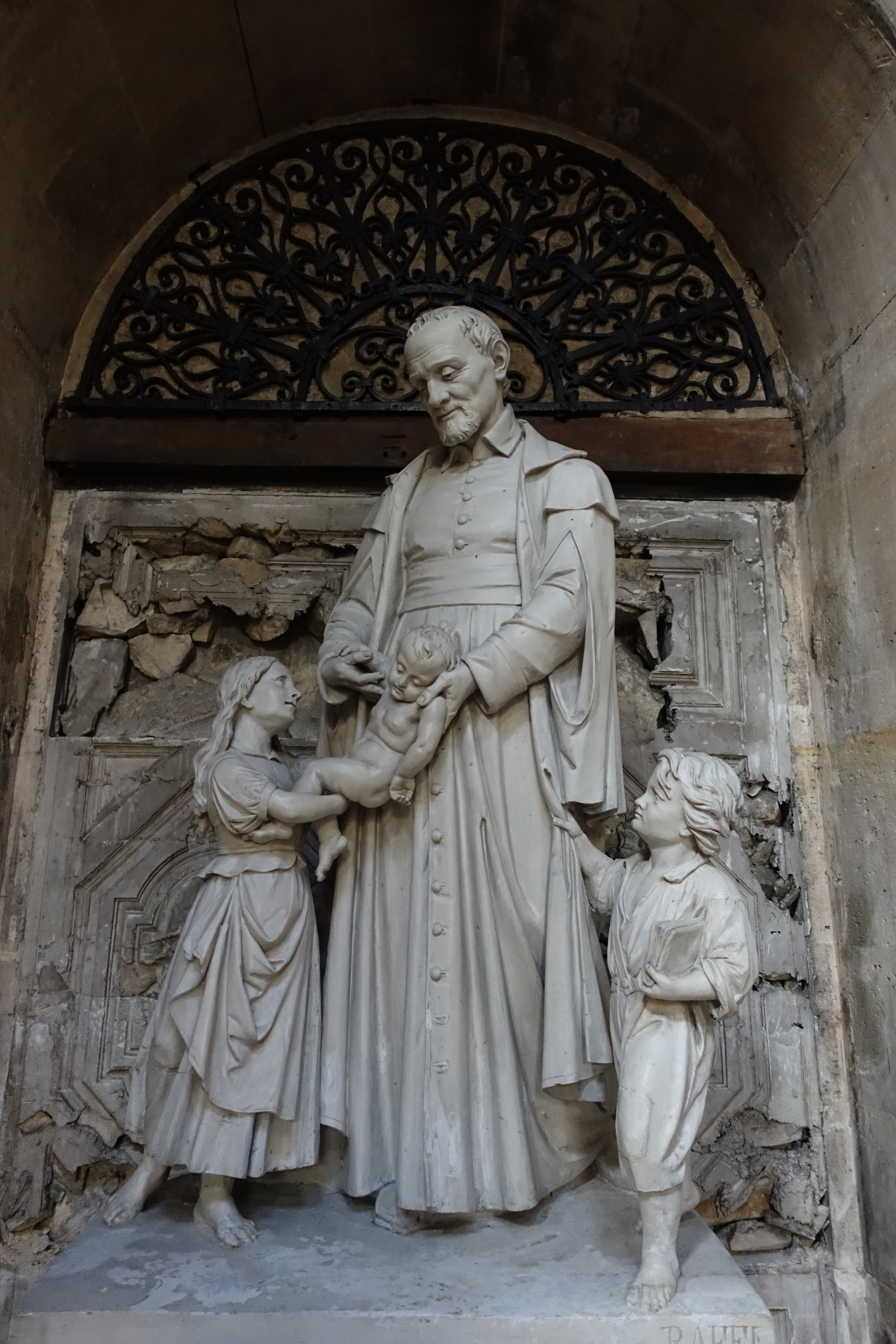
"Saint Vincent de Paul"

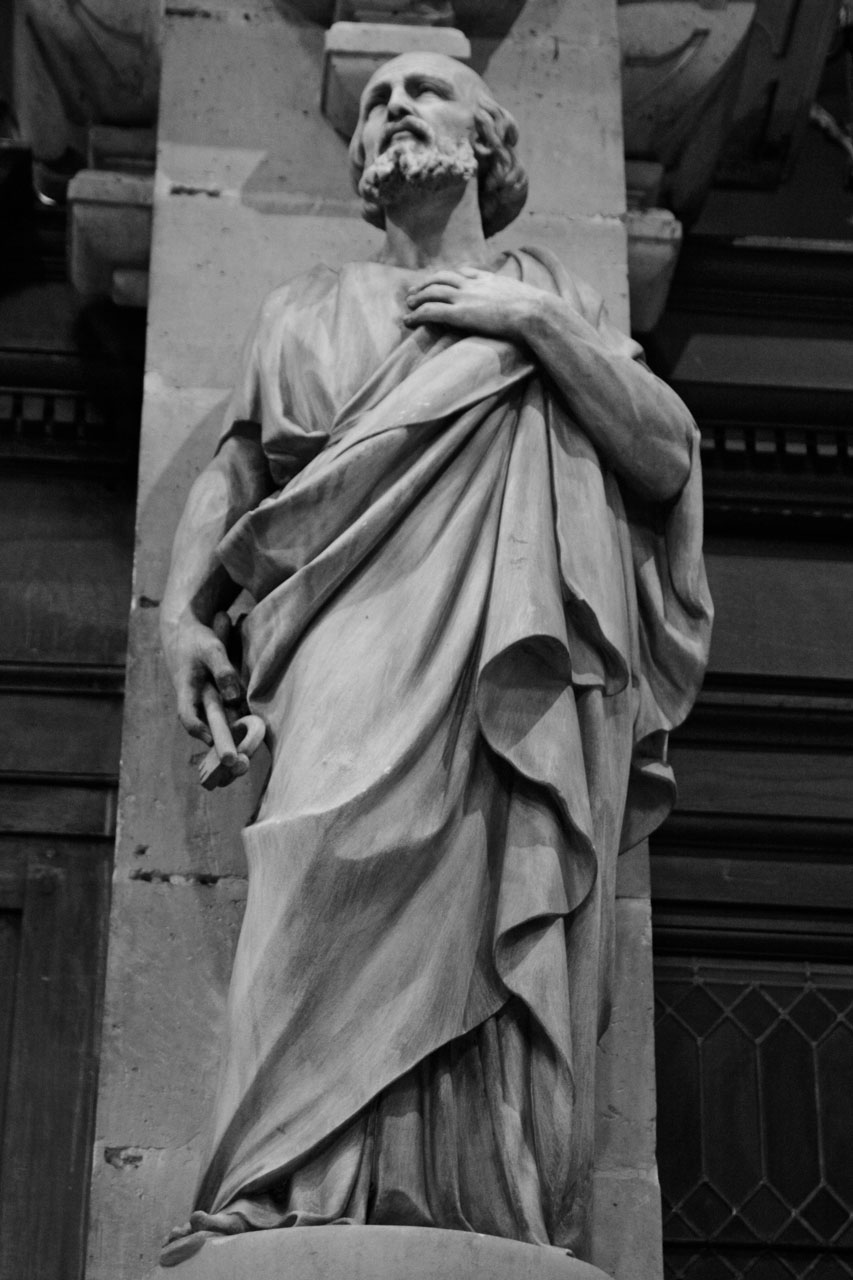
"Saint Paul", on north façade

In addition to the free-standing sculptures on the facades and interior, the pendentives of the dome and other interior architecture have their own lavish sculpture. There are very few surfaces inside the church without some sort of sculpture.

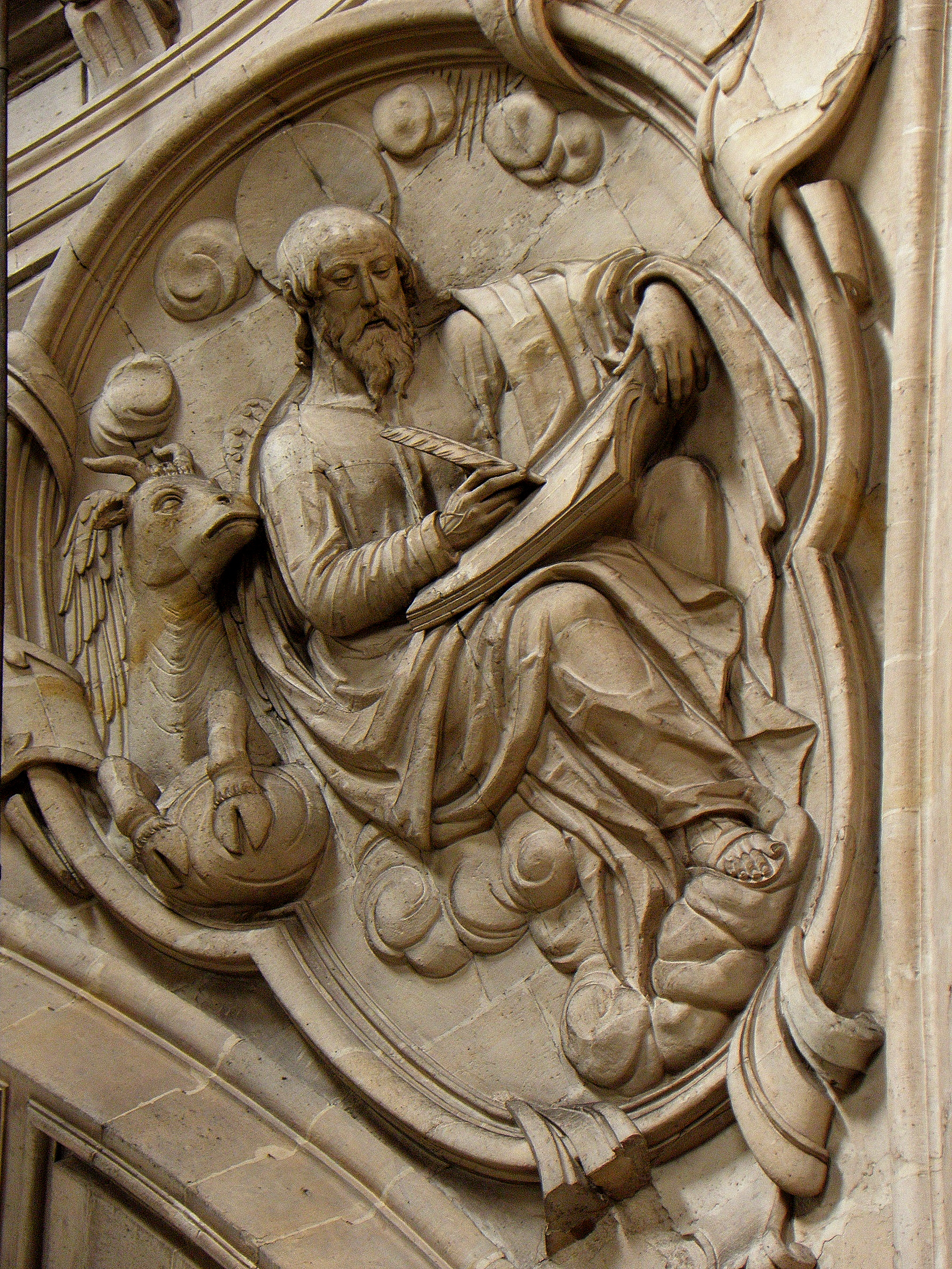
Pendentive of the dome

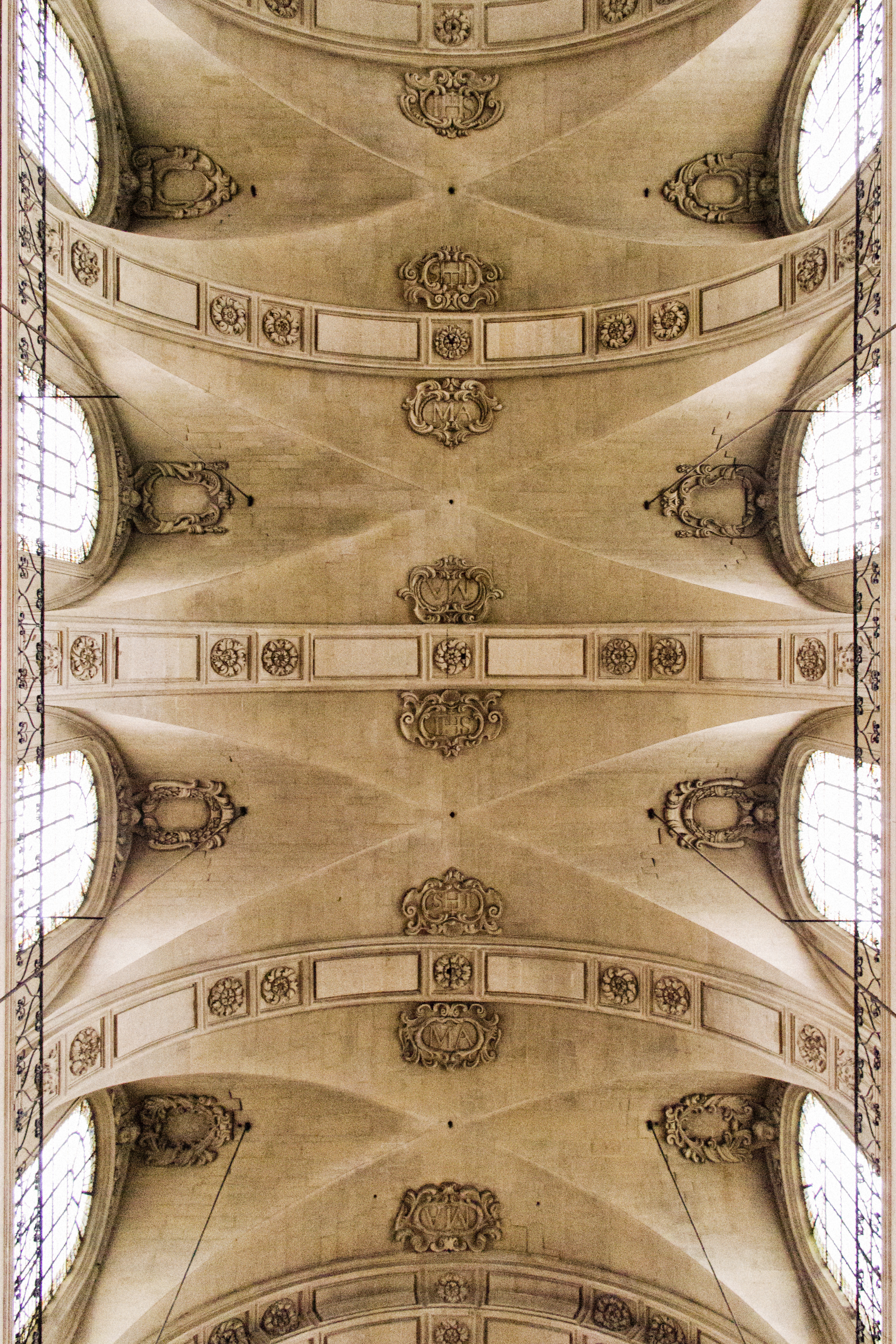
Decorated vaults of the nave

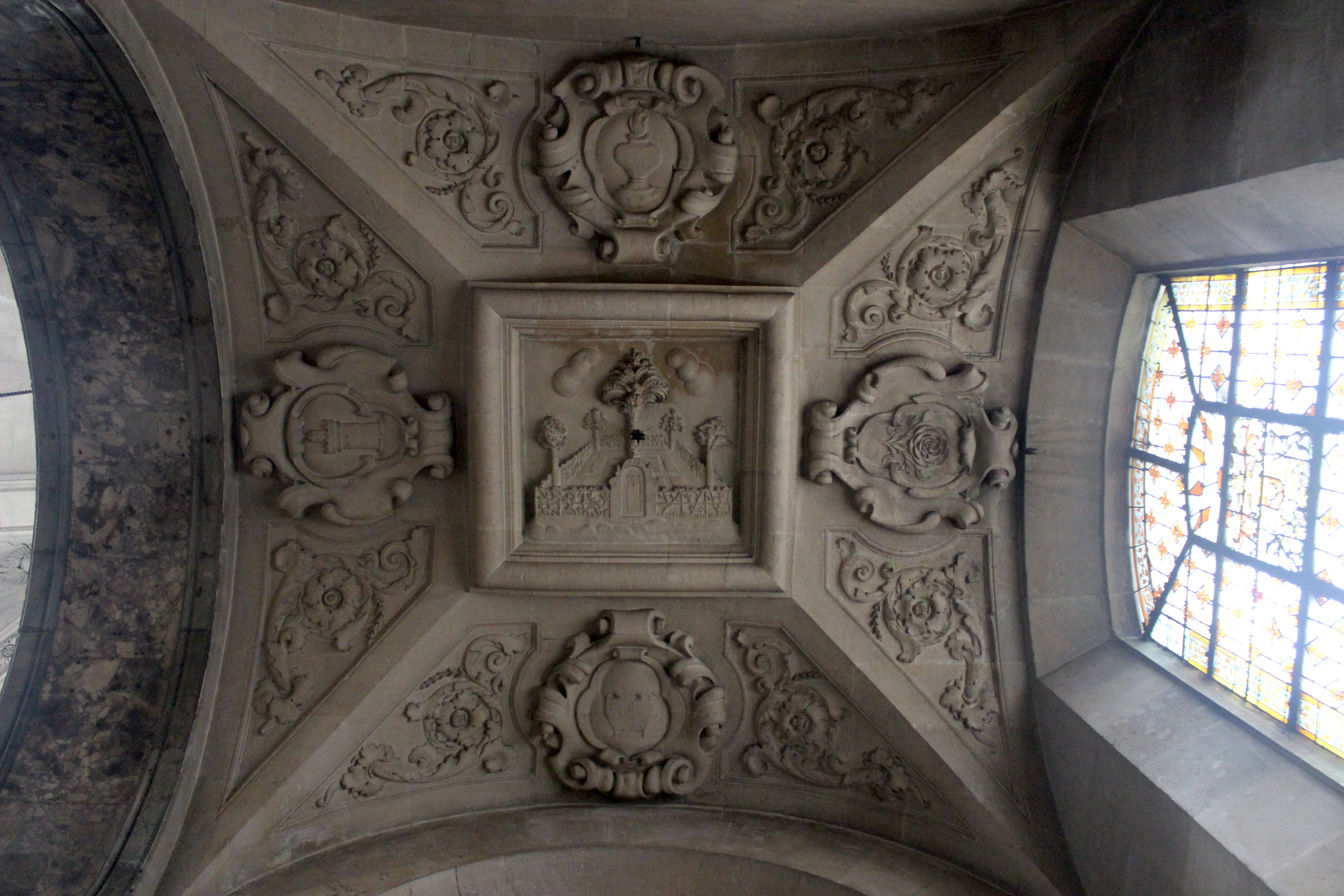
Sculpture in a ceiling vault

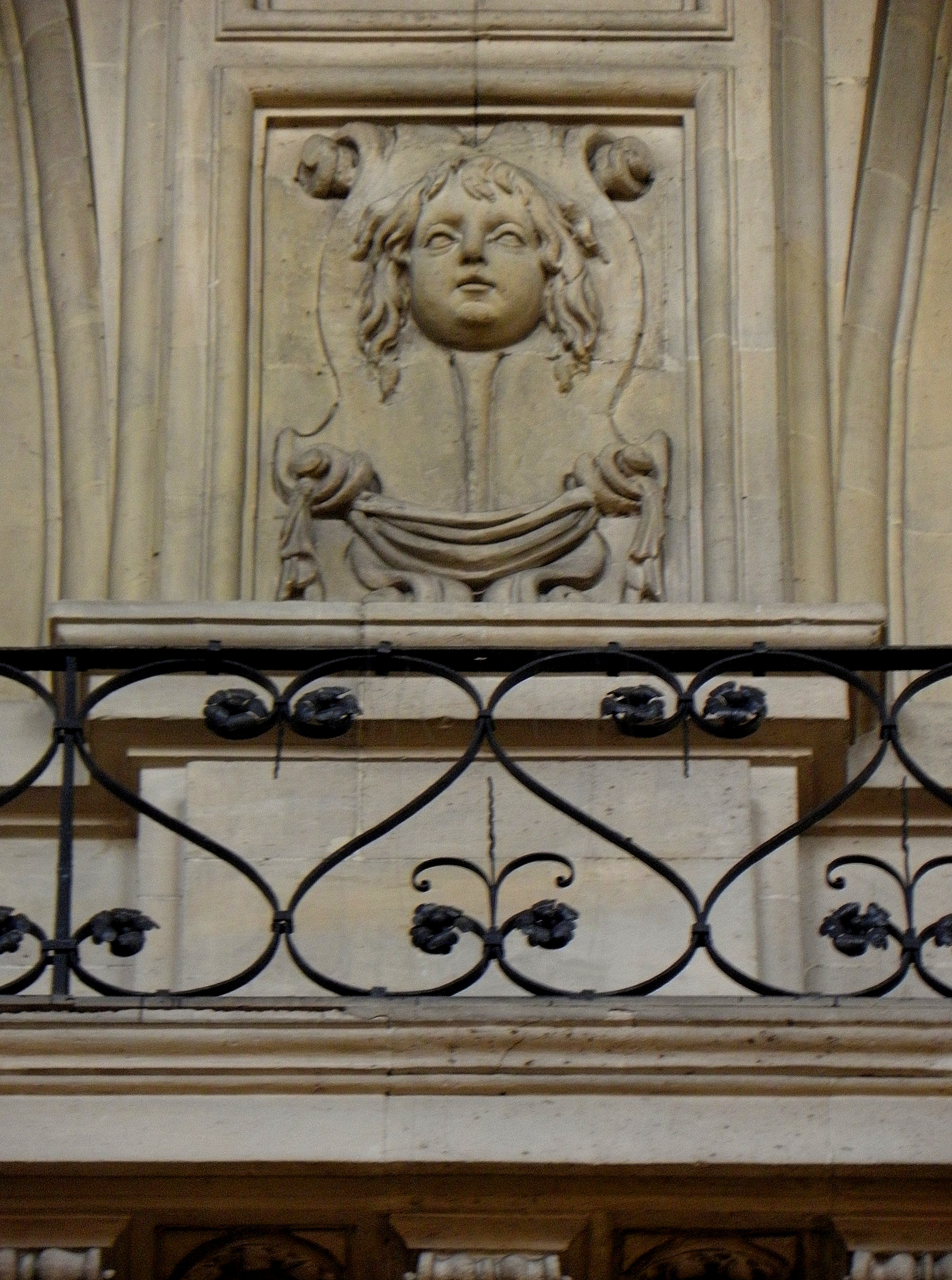
Interior sculpture below the dome
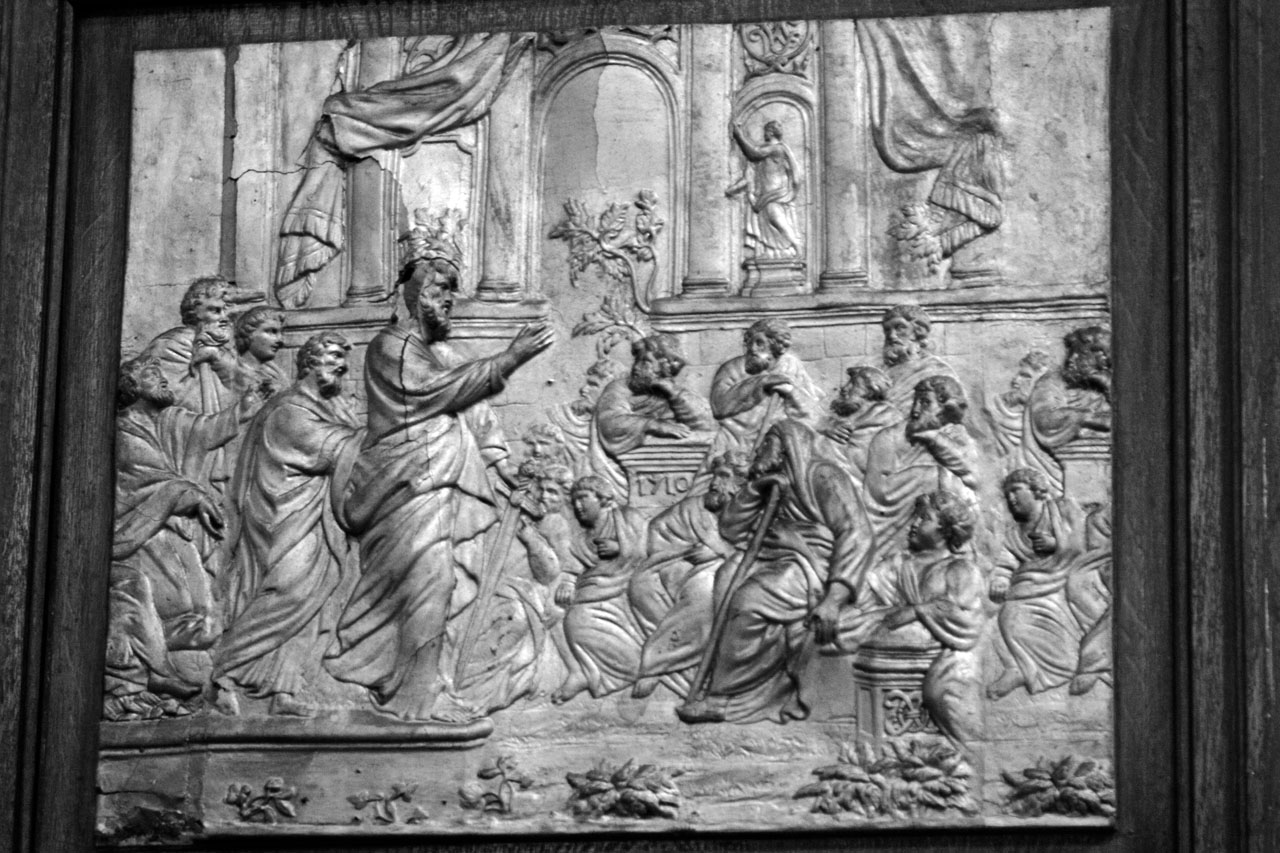
"Saint Paul Preaching in Athens", Bas-relief by Louis-Alexandre Romagnesi (1776-1852)

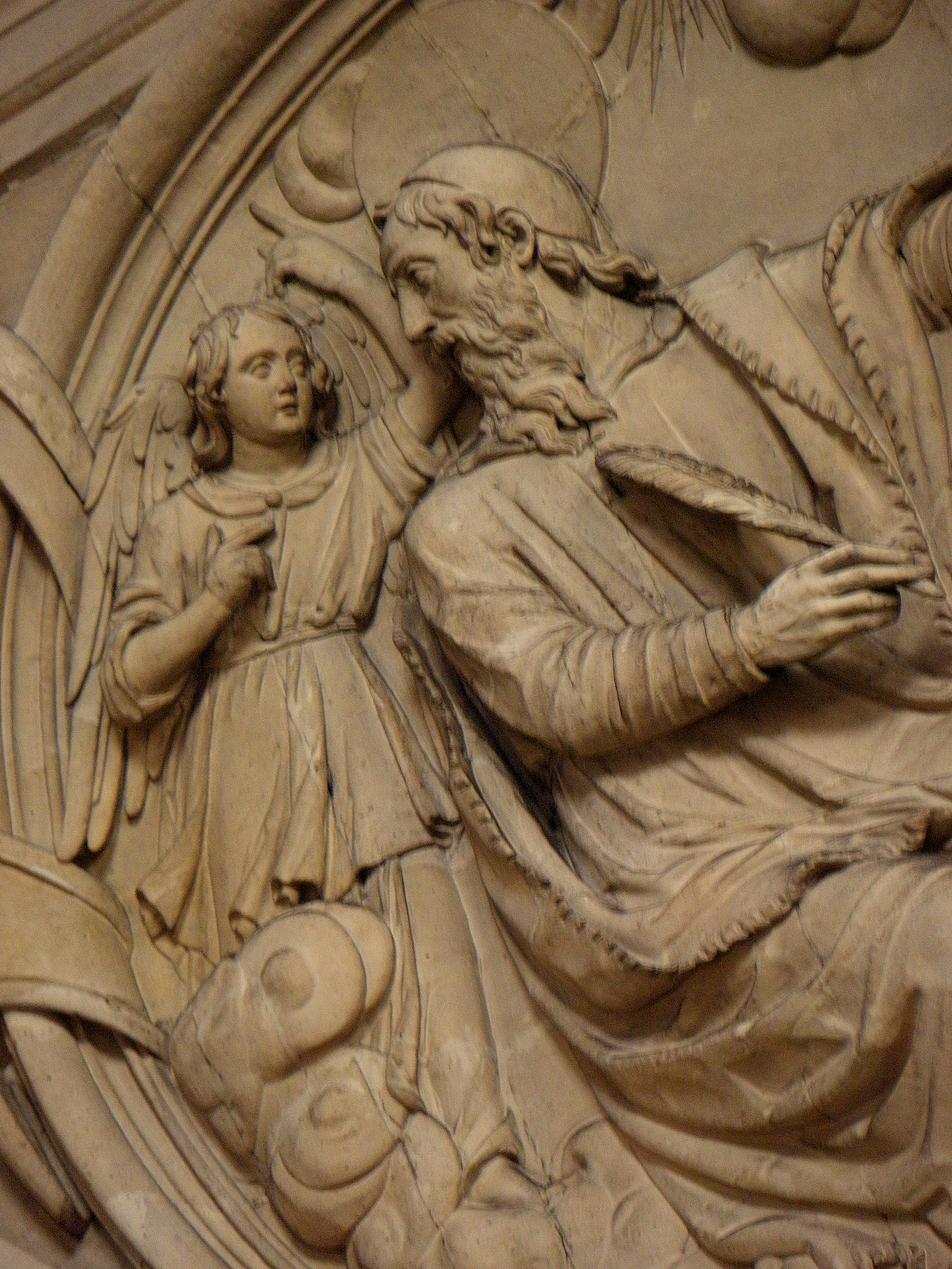
Sculpture below the dome

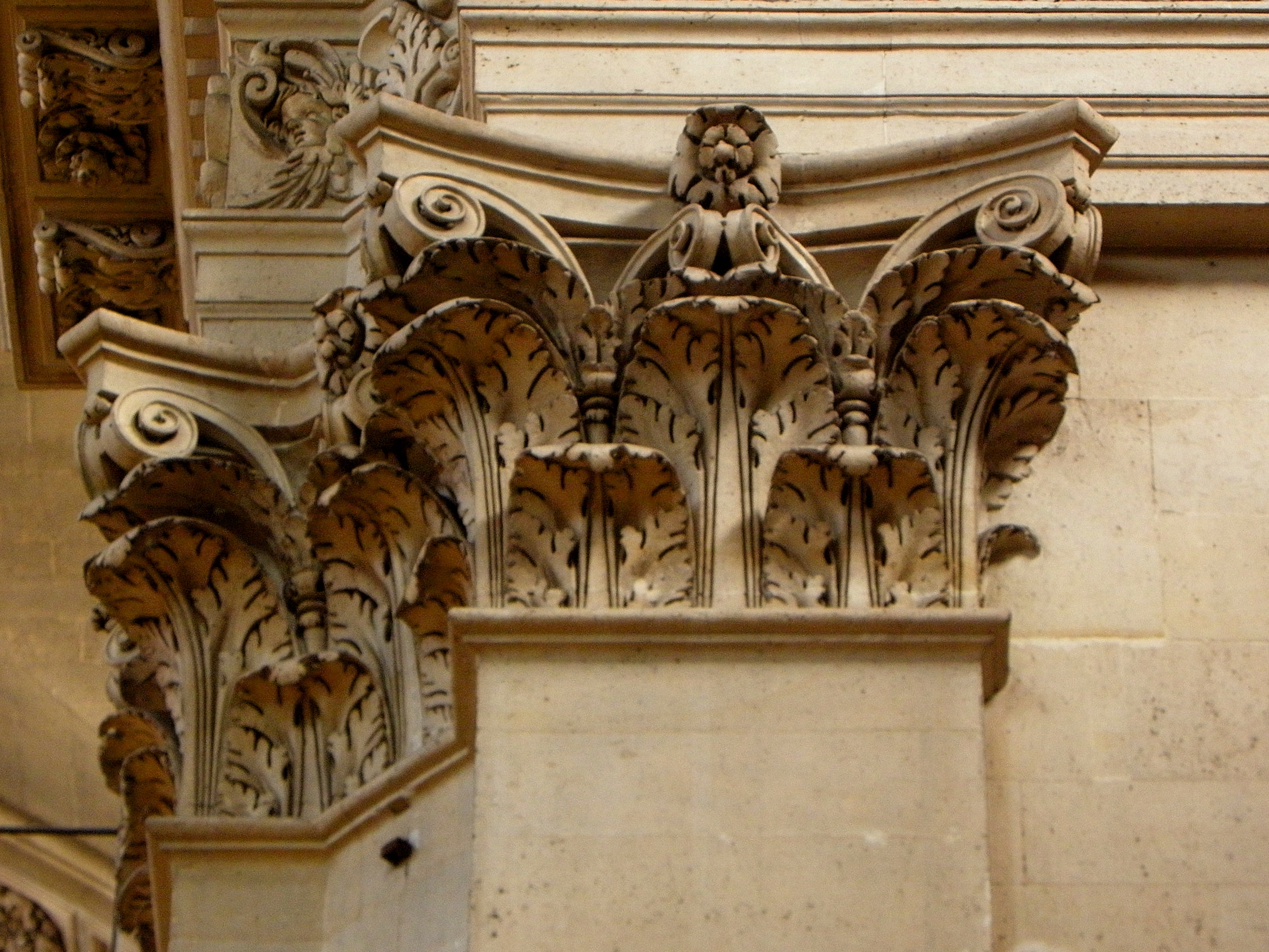
Decoration of a column capital

=== Painting ===
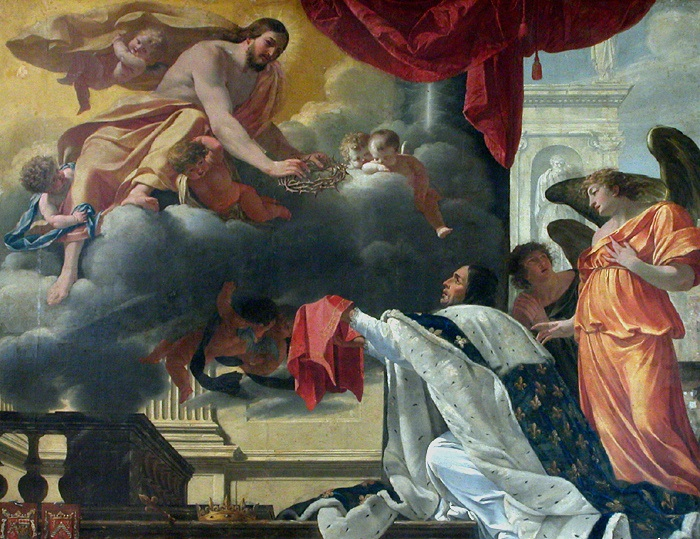
"Saint Louis receives the Crown of Thorns from the hands of Christ" by Simon Vouet, (1639)

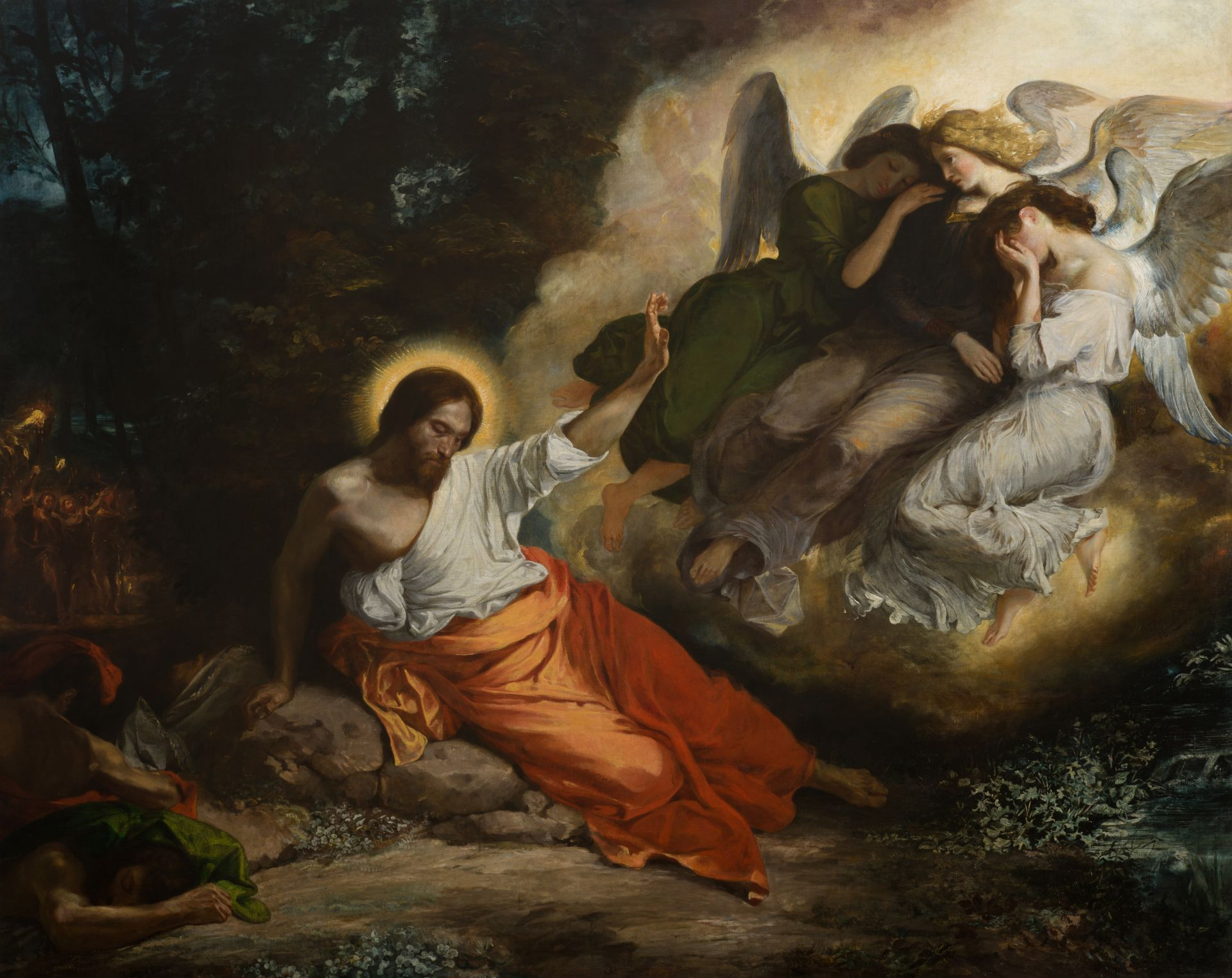
"Christ in the Garden of Olives" by Eugène Delacroix (1827) (on loan to Metropolitan Museum)

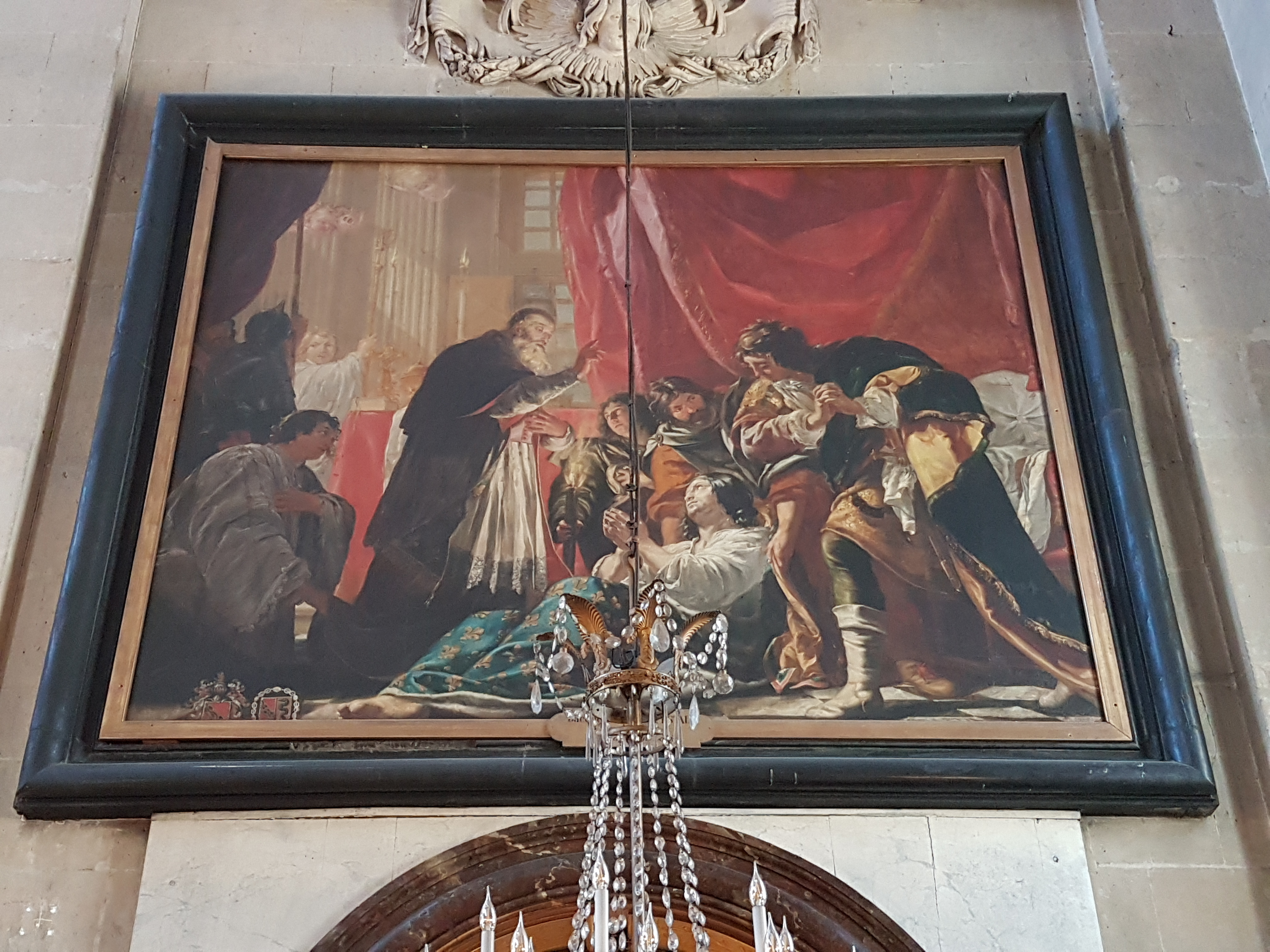
"The Death of Saint Louis" by Jacques de Létin

The church displays several notable paintings from the 17th century. A series of three paintings depicts scenes from the life of Louis IX, or Saint Louis, for whom the church named. The fourth of the series has disappeared.

- "Louis XIII offering to Saint Louis a model of the Church Saint-Louis", attributed to the workshop of Simon Vouet, located in the right transept.
- "The Death of Saint Louis", by Jacques de Létin (1597-1661), also in the right transept.
- "Saint Louis receiving the Crown of Thorns from the hands of Christ" by Michel Corneille the Elder (1601-1664) Corneille was a pupil of Simon Vouet.

Another notable work in the left transept is "Christ in the Garden of Olives" by Eugène Delacroix (1793-1863), which depicts Christ learning of his coming from the angels, and accepting it with resignation, while the disciples sleep. In his journal, Delacroix wrote: "The angels of death, sad and severe, gaze upon Christ with looks of melancholy." This paintings has been on a long-term loan to the Metropolitan Museum in New York.

The painting of the "Death of Saint Louis" by Jacques de Létin shows the King, stricken with the plague, being given the holy sacrmaents before his death. The figure on the left, face almost hidden by drapery, has the features of the artist.

== The Organs ==
=== The Gallery Organ ===
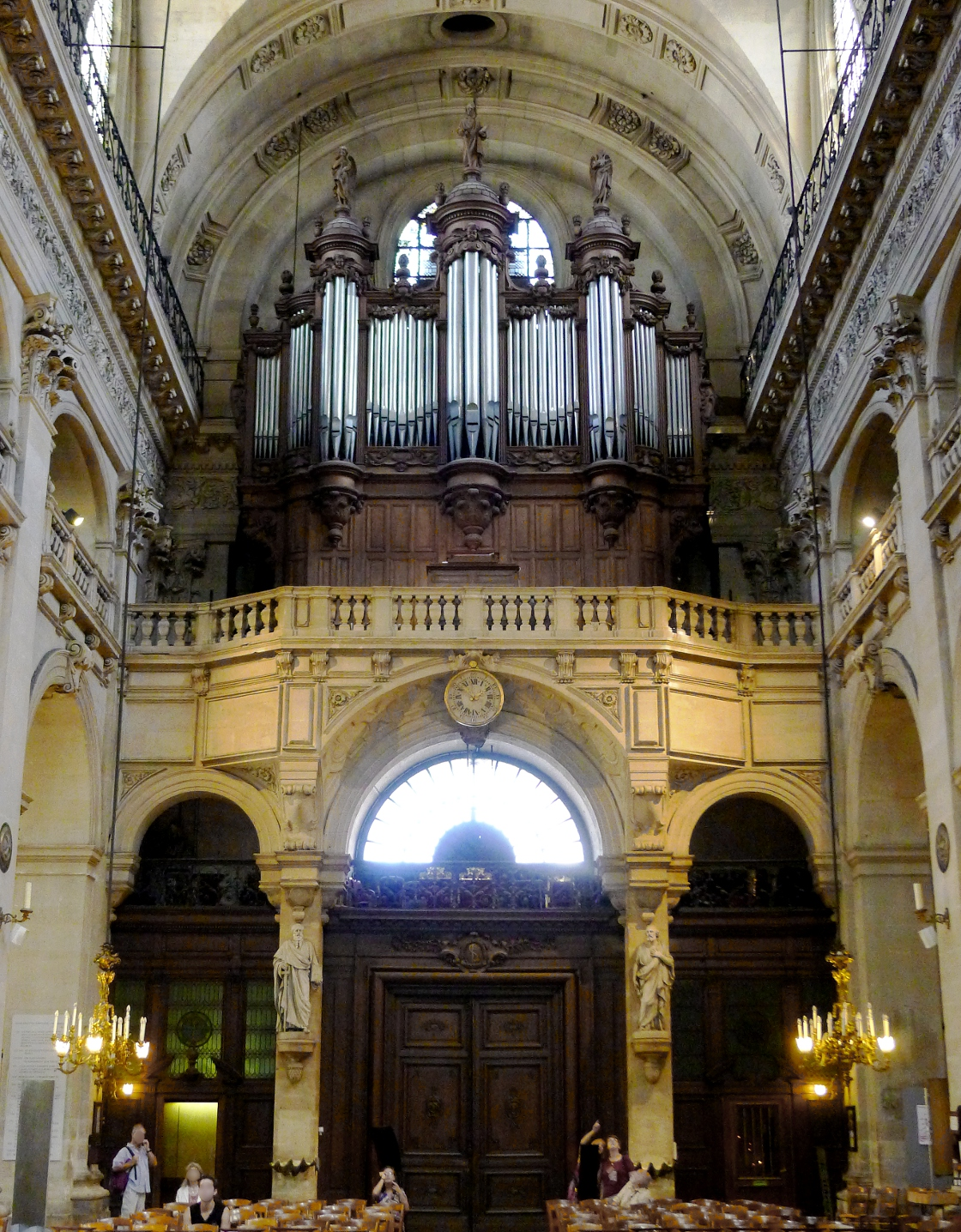
The gallery pipe organ

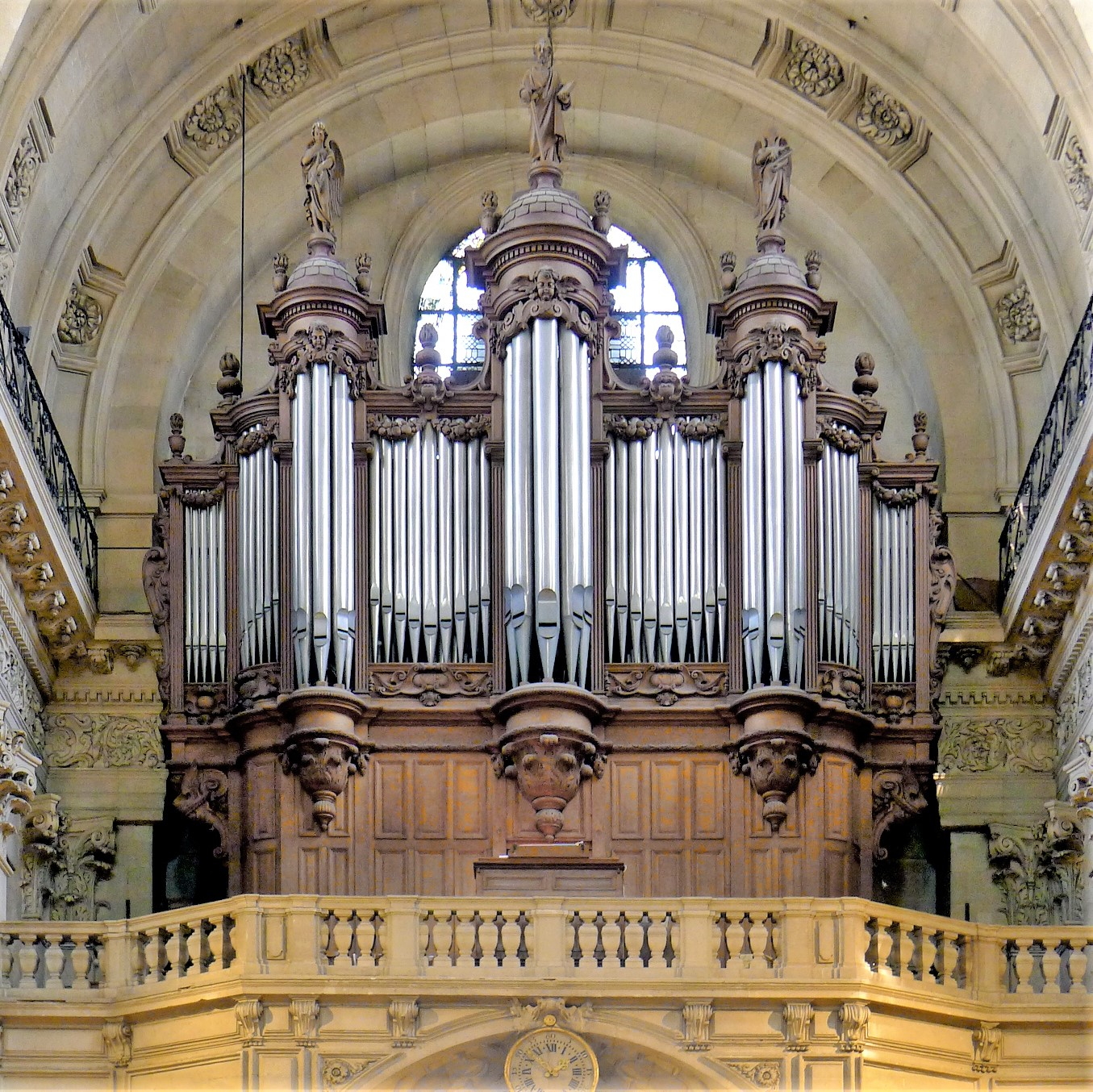
Detail of the pipe organ

During the Revolution, when the church was secularized, the existing gallery organ was dismantled and lost. After reconsecration, the organ builder Pierre Dallery used components from two other instruments to install a three-manual, 30-stop organ in 1805.

After some sixty years, in 1867 the administration of the church hired Narcisse Martin, of Rouen, to make modifications to the organ case and to completely restore the instrument at a cost that reached 37,000 francs. This work was completed in 1871 and the organ was approved by César Franck, among others. The case has been designated as an historical monument.

A century later the firm of Gonzalez undertook a major tonal restructuring of the instrument along neo-classical lines, revoicing the pipes while also electrifying the action. This work was completed in 1972. These tonal changes were later reverted in two stages, 1999 and 2005, restoring Narcisse Martin's concept, but also providing a more Romantic-styled Récit manual. The organ acquired an electronic combination system as well.

The current instrument has three manuals with a compass of 56 notes, plus a 30-note pedal board, and consists of 40 stops and 46 ranks.

=== The Chancel Organ ===
The organ in the chancel was built in the nineteenth century by Krischer as a two-manual plus pedal mechanical action instrument. It comprises 13 stops and 16 ranks. Like the gallery organ, the manuals have a compass of 56 notes, with 30 notes in the pedal.

== See also ==
- List of historic churches in Paris
- List of Jesuit sites

== Bibliography (in French) ==
- Dumoulin, Aline; Ardisson, Alexandra; Maingard, Jérôme; Antonello, Murielle; Églises de Paris (2010), Éditions Massin, Issy-Les-Moulineaux, ISBN 978-2-7072-0683-1
- Hillairet, Jacques; Connaissance du Vieux Paris; (2017); Éditions Payot-Rivages, Paris; (in French). ISBN 978-2-2289-1911-1
