= Jacques de Létin =

French painter

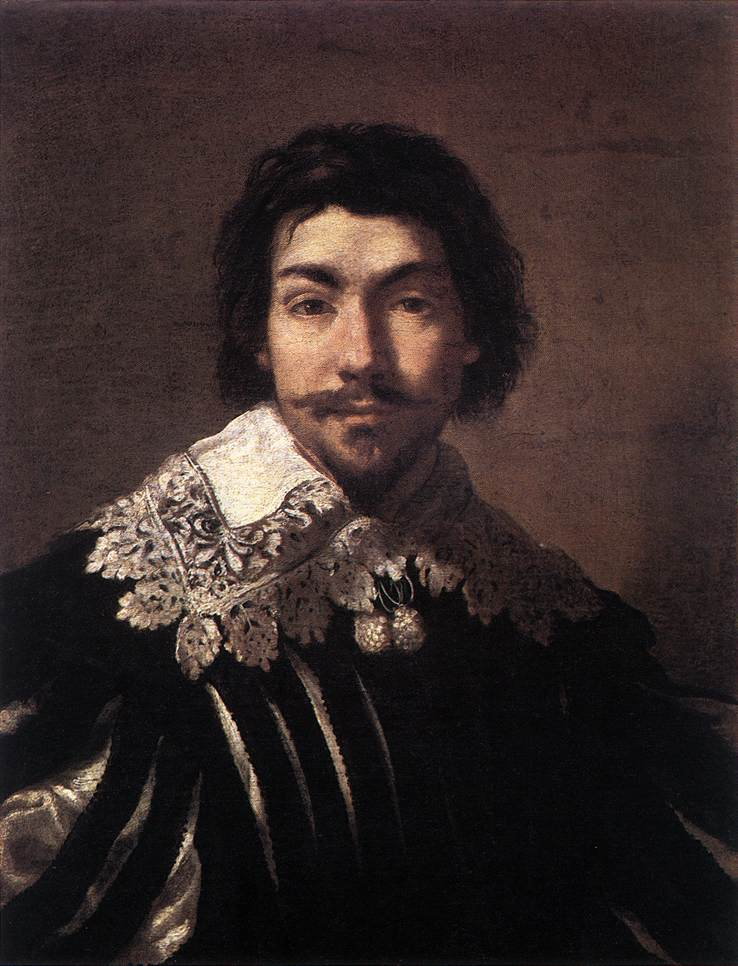
Self-portrait (before 1650)

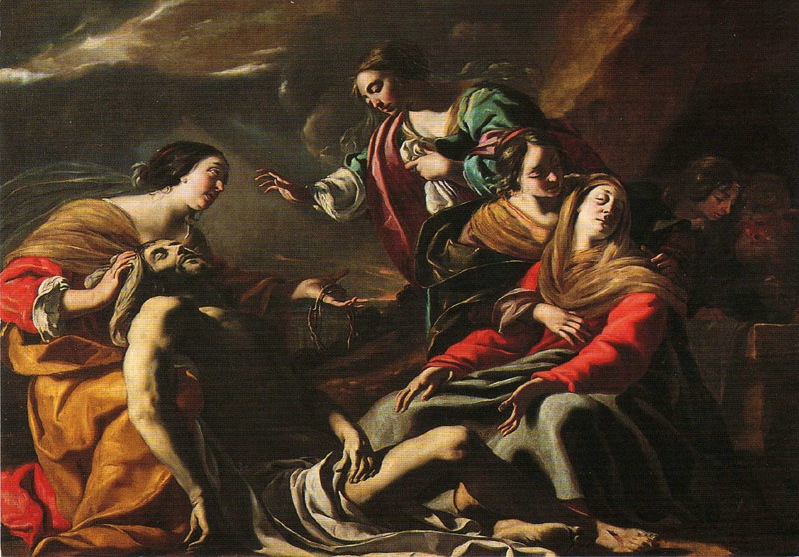
Lamentation for the Dead Christ

Jacques de Létin, or Jacques Ninet de Lestin, or Jacques de L'Estin (1597, Troyes - October, 1661, Troyes) was a French painter, primarily of religious scenes. He was also trained as a goldsmith.

== Biography ==
He was born to a middle-class family. His father, Jehan, ran a hotel called L'Image de Saint-Christophe.

He trained with the painter and goldsmith, Edme Doué (?-1626), who had married his sister, Simonne, in 1613. At the time, many young painters were attracted to the works of Carvaggio. This prompted him to travel to Rome, where he lived from 1622 to 1625; sharing an apartment with the painter, Charles Mellin, and the sculptor Jacques Sarrazin. He also met and became a lifelong friend of Simon Vouet.

He returned to Troyes in 1626, set up a studio and got married shortly after. His workshop was very successful and the numerous commissions he received involved many long stays in Paris. He was, in fact, there for much of the period from 1633 to 1639, In 1636, he was chosen to be the "Painter of May" for Notre-Dame de Paris. His contribution was Saint Paul Preaching on the Areopagus (destroyed during the Franco-Prussian War). He produced secular as well as religious works.

In 1645, he settled permanently in Troyes, purchased some land and built a large manor house. He appears to have painted little after that and was quickly forgotten. By the end of the 17th century, he was only cited by name in relation to Vouet. At some point, he was referred to as Ninet de Lestin, due to a typographical error, which was continued until 1882, when the local historian, Albert Babeau, discovered it and did more research on his life.

Many of his paintings were destroyed or disappeared; during the French Revolution, the Franco-Prussian War and World War II, although some works have newly attributed to him; notably, personifications of Grammar and Geometry, acquired by the Musée des beaux-arts de Bordeaux in 2011.

A street and a school in Troyes have been named after him.
