= French Baroque architecture =

17th-century French architectural style

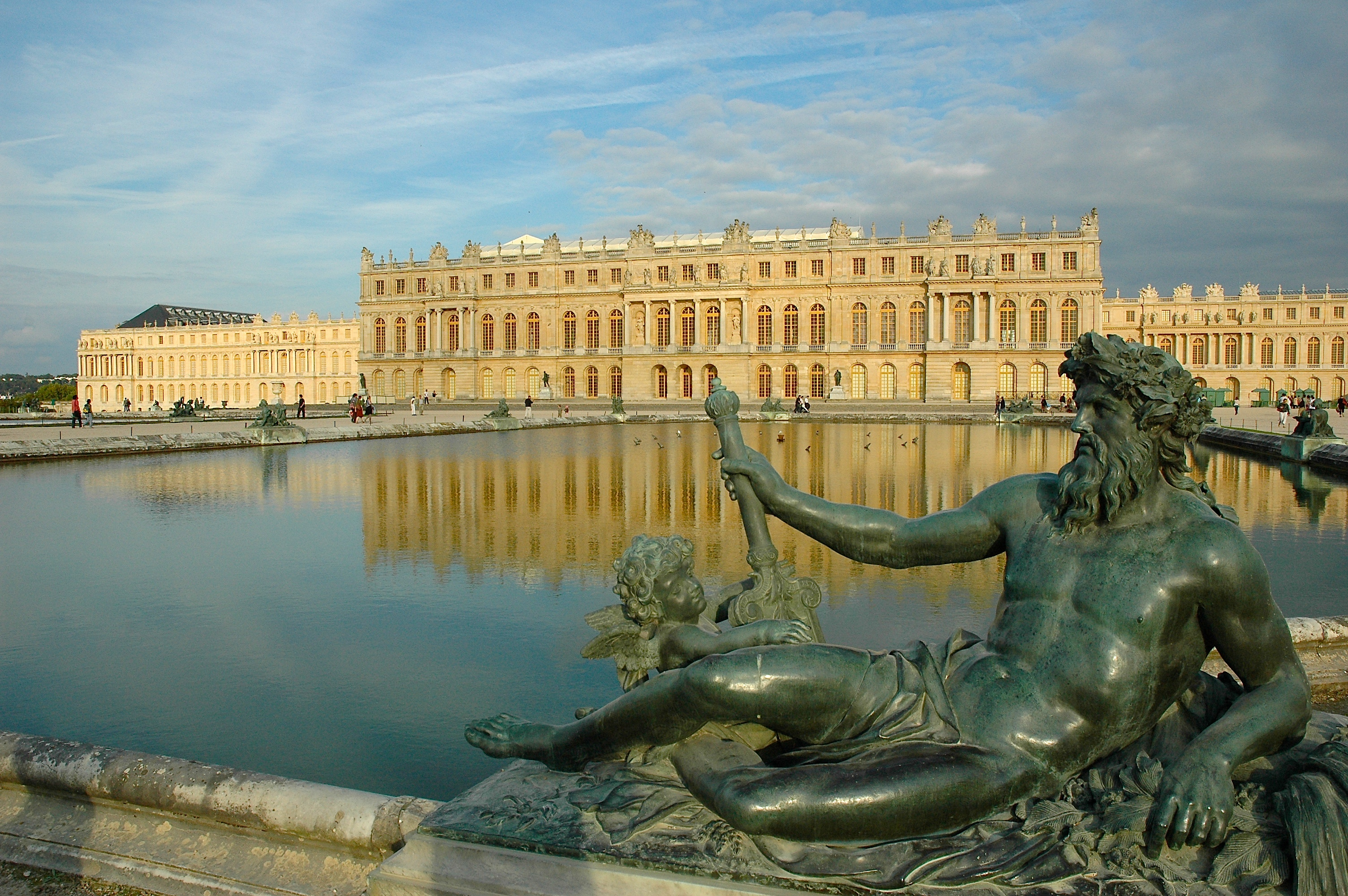
Palace of Versailles

French Baroque architecture, referred to as Classicism in France (French: classicisme) and more broadly in stylistic analysis when contrasted to its European Baroque counterparts, was a style of architecture that marked the reigns of Louis XIII (1610–1643), Louis XIV (1643–1715) and Louis XV (1715–1774). It was preceded by French Renaissance architecture and Mannerism and was followed in the second half of the 18th century by French Neoclassical architecture. Although it historically belongs to the Baroque period, it distances itself from its stylistic grammar: originally inspired by Italian Baroque architecture, it was characterized, particularly under Louis XIV, by harmonious sobriety, monumental regularity, and ornamental clarity, having among its main features the colossal order of façades, and the use of colonnades and cupolas, to symbolize the power and grandeur of the King. Notable examples of French Classicism include the east façade of the Louvre, the Grand Trianon of the Palace of Versailles, and the dome of Les Invalides as well as the greater part of Paris architecture in the era of absolutism. In the final years of Louis XIV and the reign of Louis XV, the colossal orders gradually disappeared, the style became lighter and saw the introduction of wrought iron decoration in rocaille designs. The period also saw the introduction of monumental urban squares in Paris and other cities, notably Place Vendôme and the Place de la Concorde. The style profoundly influenced 18th-century secular architecture throughout Europe; the Palace of Versailles and the French formal garden were copied by other courts all over Europe.

== Naming ==
From a historical perspective, this style belongs to the Baroque era; consequently, it is sometimes simply referred to as "French Baroque architecture" to highlight its connection to the broader artistic context of 17th-century Europe; from a stylistic point of view however, the specificity of the French Grand Siècle style (classical symmetry and sober, monumental exterior structures) is widely recognized and earns it the designation of "French Classicism". For this reason, the term Baroque when applied to France has a meaning more specifically linked to its etymological sense of intricate irregularity, allowing for surprise, distorted grotesquerie, and reflecting a taste for the singular and the unusual which is "characterized by over-ornamentation, excess, emotion, metamorphosis, illusion, and movement". Similarly to literature with Théodore Agrippa d'Aubigné or Pierre Corneille's L'Illusion comique, the architectural "Baroque style" in the strict sense therefore primarily relates to art from the early 17th century in France (for instance the Luxembourg Palace, albeit already displaying classical influences, or the baldachin and high altar of the Val-de-Grâce church).

== Early French Classicism emerging from the Baroque ==
French Classicism was, from the beginning, an expression of the power and majesty of the Kings of France. It proceeded deliberately in a different direction from Italy and the rest of Europe, combining classical elements, especially colossal orders of columns, and avoiding the exuberant Baroque decoration that appeared on façades and interiors in Spain, Germany and Central Europe. It was used less frequently on churches and more often in the design of royal palaces and country residences. Another distinctive element of the French Classicism was the integration of the architecture of the house with the formal gardens around it, in what became known as the French formal garden.

Salomon de Brosse (1571–1626) was one of the first French architects to adopt the style, in the construction of the Palais du Luxembourg he built for the mother of Louis XIII, Marie de' Medici between 1615 and 1624. The Luxembourg Palace established a new pattern for royal residences, with pavilions on the corners, lateral wings, and a grand central entrance surmounted by a cupola. The walls feature colossal orders of columns with triangular pediments, indicating the classical inspiration behind the French movement. A traditional French feature was the high sloping mansard roof and the complex roofline. Like the Villa Medici in Rome, the palace was surrounded by a large garden and fountains. The interior design was also innovative; the pavilions around the main block contained the apartments, allowing a greater flexibility and functionality of the interior space.

One of the most accomplished formulators of the new style was François Mansart, a tireless perfectionist. He was not the first to use the sloping mansard roof, but he used it so effectively that it took his name. In his design for the Château de Maisons in Maisons-Laffitte, (1630–51), Mansart showed the continuity between the French Renaissance style and the new style. The structure is strictly symmetrical, with an order applied to each story, mostly in pilaster form. The frontispiece, crowned with a separate aggrandized roof, is infused with remarkable plasticity and the whole ensemble reads like a three-dimensional whole. Mansart's structures are stripped of overblown decorative effects, so typical of contemporary Rome. Italian Baroque influence is muted and relegated to the field of decorative ornamentation.

Louis Le Vau was another central figure in the early French Classicism style. He designed the Château of Vaux-le-Vicomte (1656–1661) for Nicolas Fouquet, the Superintendent of Finances of the young Louis XIV. The design of the château itself was similar to that of the Luxembourg Palace and the Palazzo Barberini in Rome. What made it distinctive from earlier styles was the unity of its architecture, interior, and landscape around it. Its façade featured stylized monumental columns, wings combined with mansard roofs and a prominent dome, in the Baroque style. The interior was lavishly decorated with murals by Charles Le Brun and it was placed in the center of enormous formal gardens designed by André Le Notre, laid out in geometric patterns paths, flower beds, fountains and reflecting pools, which seemed to extend the architecture of the house in every direction. The grand salon of the building opened out onto the garden, a feature which thereafter became a regular feature of Baroque palaces. After seeing the lavishness of the building, the King dismissed and imprisoned Fouquet, took possession of the house for the crown, and soon put Le Vau to work to create his own palace in Versailles.

The same three artists scaled this concept to monumental proportions in the royal hunting lodge and later main Palace of Versailles (1661–1690). On a far grander scale, the palace is a hypertrophied and somewhat repetitive version of Vaux-le-Vicomte. It was both the most grandiose and the most imitated residential building of the 17th century. Mannheim Palace, Nordkirchen Castle and Drottningholm Palace were among many foreign residences for which Versailles provided a model.

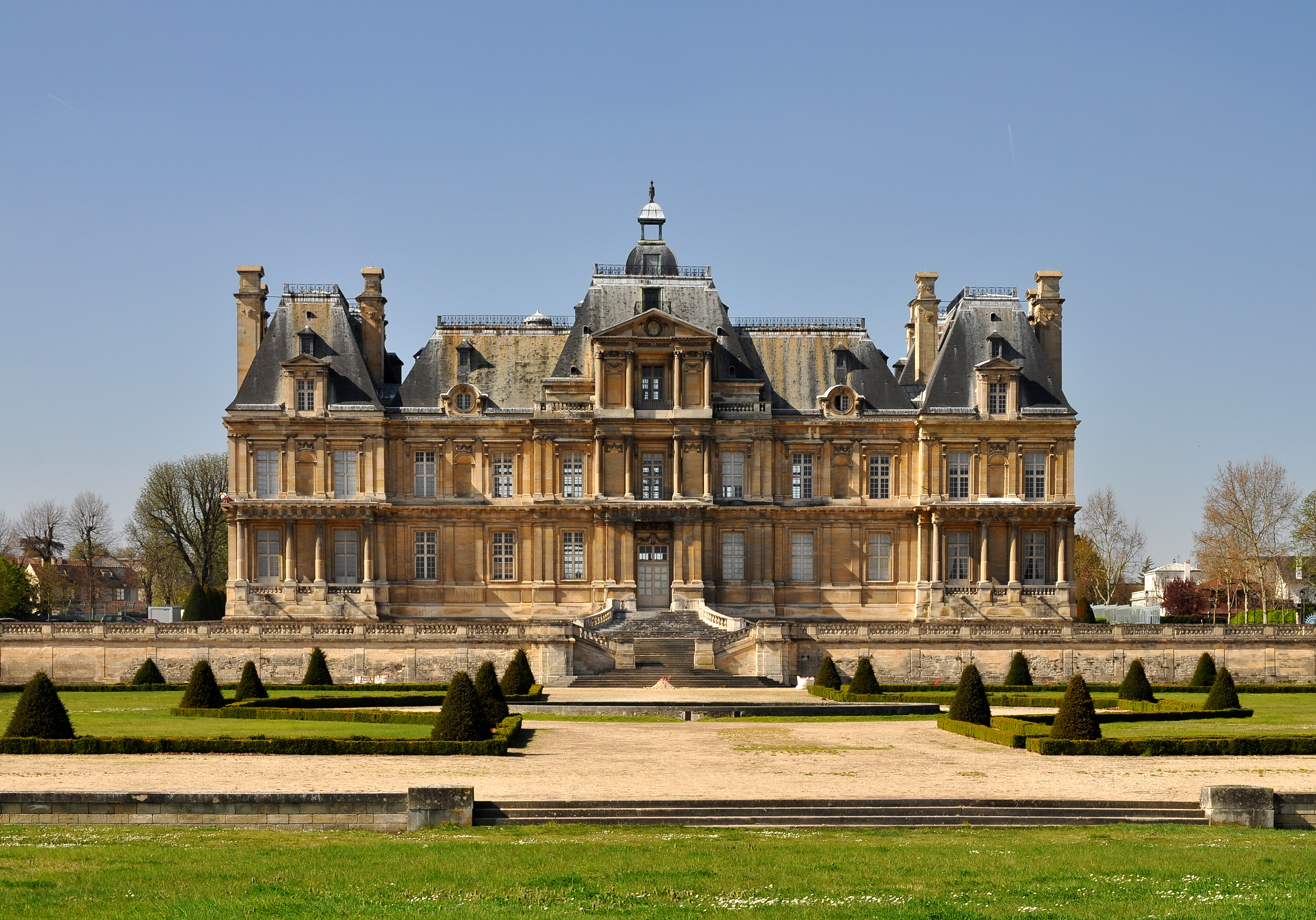
Château de Maisons-Laffitte by François Mansart, (1630–51)

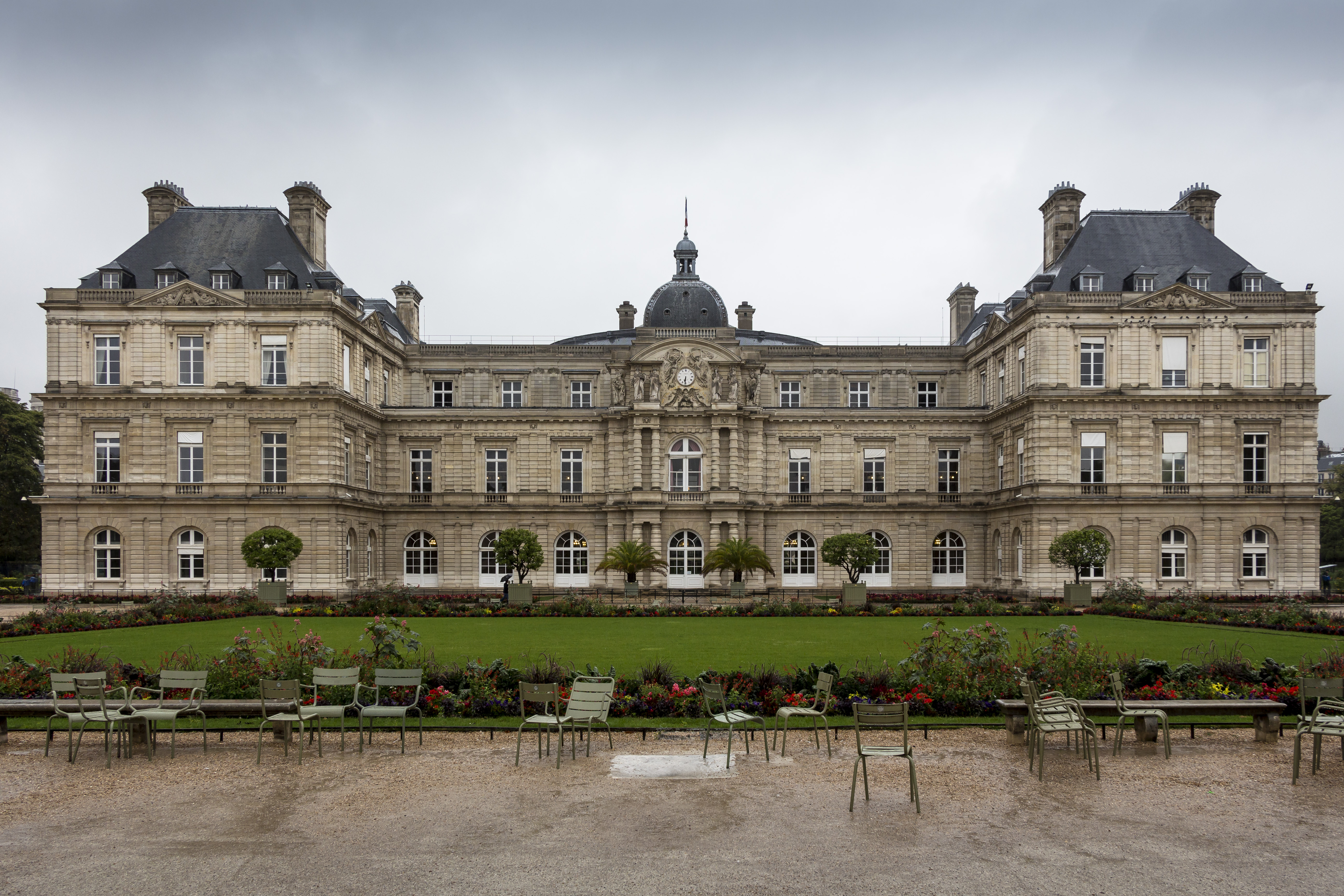
Palais du Luxembourg by Salomon de Brosse (1615–1620)

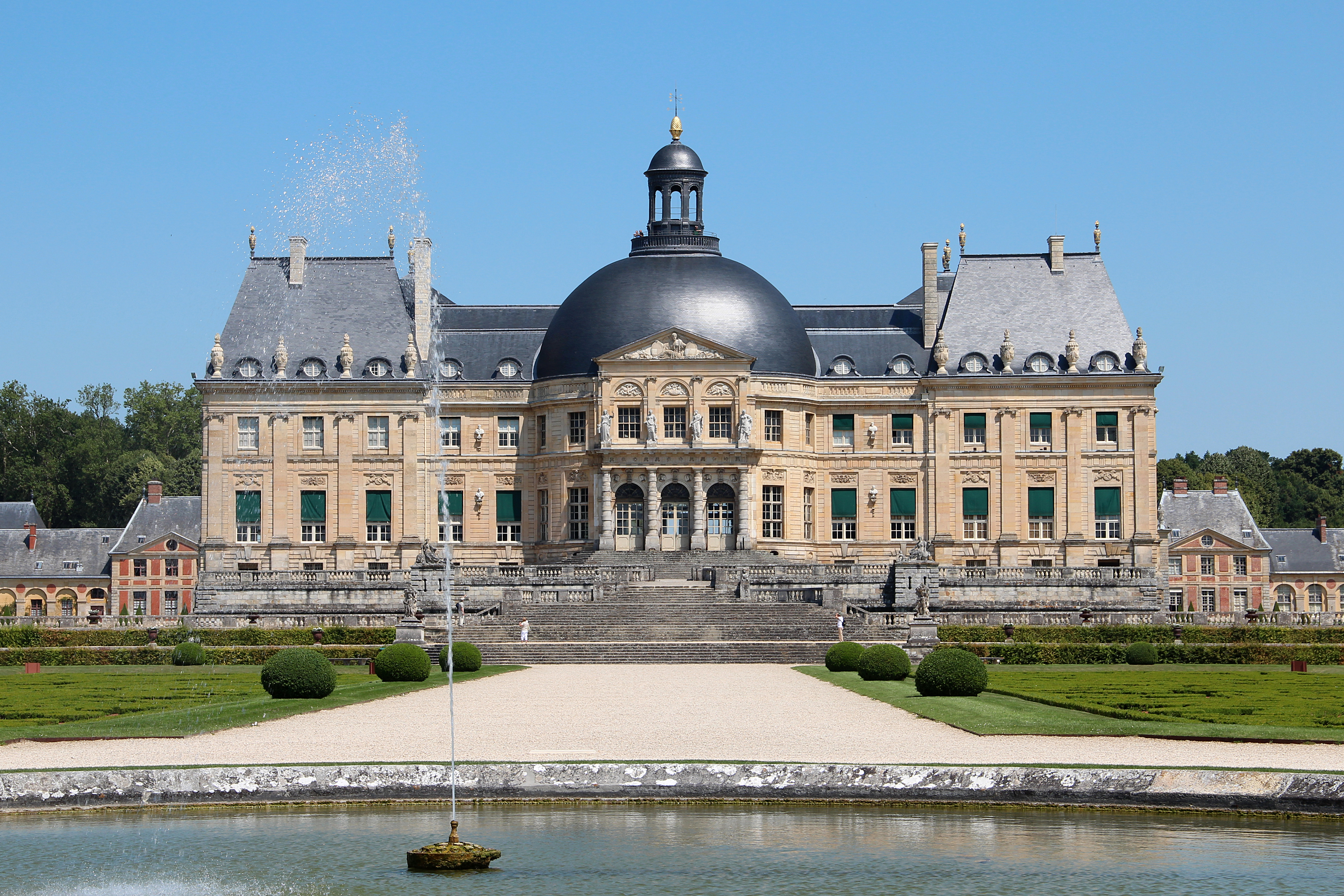
Vaux-le-Vicomte near Paris, by Louis Le Vau and André Le Nôtre, (1656-1661)

== The Louvre Colonnade ==
In 1665, the chief minister of Louis XIV, Jean Colbert, invited the most famous architect and sculptor of the Italian Baroque, Gian Lorenzo Bernini to Paris, to propose a design for the new east wing of the Louvre, located on the eastern side of the Cour Carrée (Square Courtyard). This design would have aligned the architecture of Paris to the Italian Baroque style. However, in the end Louis turned instead to French designers. He wanted a design that would be distinctly French, rather than a copy of the Italian style. In April 1667, he gave the commission to a committee, the Petit Conseil, consisting of Louis Le Vau, Charles Le Brun, and Claude Perrault, and the three men designed the new façade together. It featured the giant order, that is, a long row of double columns two stories high, resting on top of a massive lower level with tall, segmental-arched windows, modeled on those used for the Renaissance-style Lescot Wing. It had a flat roof concealed by a balustrade, with a triangular pediment in the center over the main entry. In 1668 a decision was made to double the width of the south wing, resulting in the construction a new façade on the south, facing the Seine. Perrault also designed a new façade on the interior of the court facing west, and a matching new façade on the north.

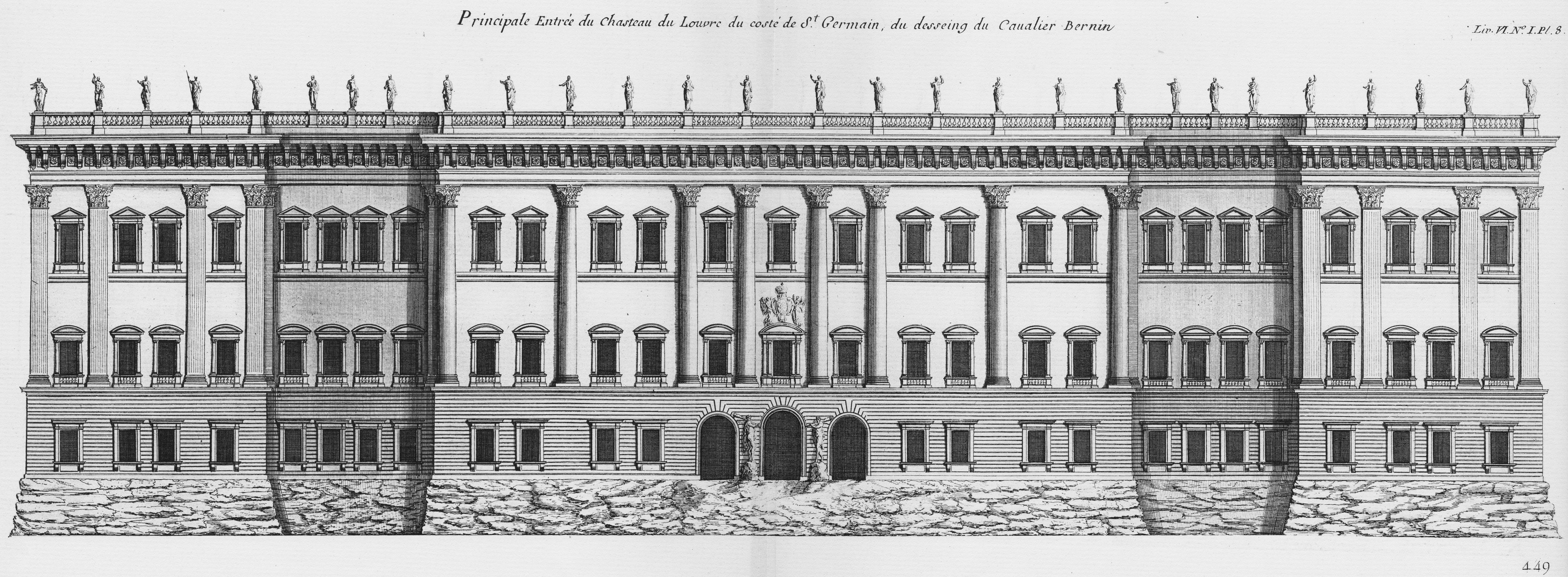
Proposed Baroque east façade of Louvre by Gian Lorenzo Bernini

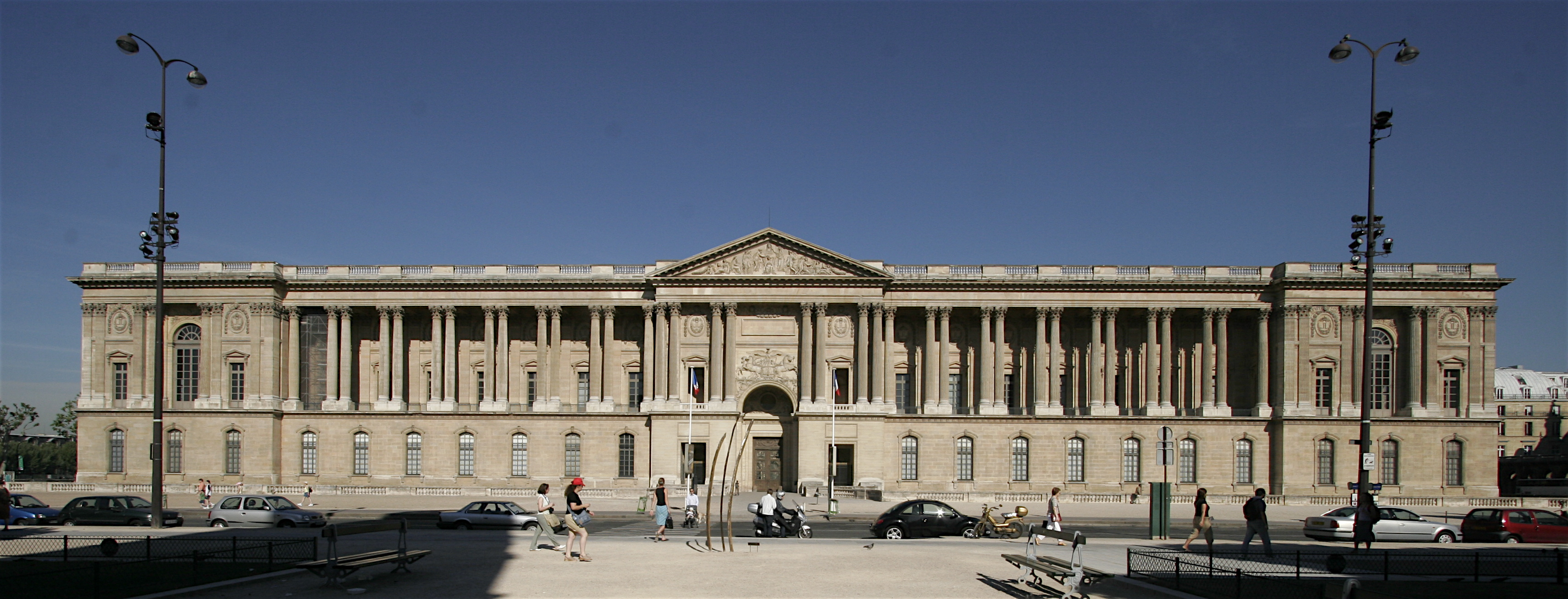
Louvre Colonnade

== The Palace of Versailles ==
The most important showcase of the French Classicism was the Palace of Versailles. It was begun in 1624 by Louis XIII as a hunting lodge. In 1634, Louis XIII had it enlarged into a château by his chief architect and engineer, Philibert Le Roy. In 1661, Louis XIV decided to enlarge it further, without destroying the original. He commissioned Louis Le Vau and Charles Le Brun as his architect and designer, and assigned André Le Nôtre to create a grand formal garden that could be viewed from the Château, on the model of Vaux-le-Vicomte. When Le Vau died in 1670, the project was given to his assistant François d'Orbay, who completed the initial phase in 1674.

The new palace surrounded the old brick château, with new wings the north, south and to the rear. The façade, like the new Louvre wing, featured colossal order columns, while the roof was flat with a terrance, decorated with balustrades, pilasters, balconies, statues, and trophies. Beginning in 1674–75, Le Brun created the interior with a small army of painters, sculptors, and decorators. They used marble, polychrome stone, bronze mirrors, and gilded stucco, while Le Brun himself painted the ceiling. The Hall of Mirrors, constructed in 1678–1680 by Jules Hardouin-Mansart, the nephew of Francois Mansart, overlooked the new garden. It was also decorated by Le Brun, who completed it in 1684, after which it became the symbol of the entire French Baroque style. The new Palace was open to almost any visitor, and became an immense theatre, where the King carried out his ceremonies, with meticulous protocol, in public view.

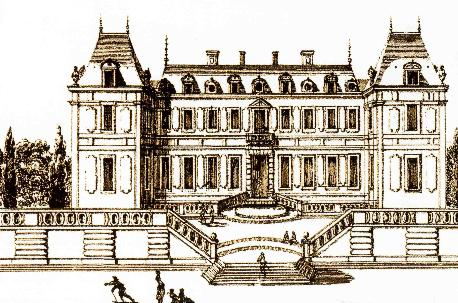
Garden façade of the first Chateau by Philibert Le Roy (1634)

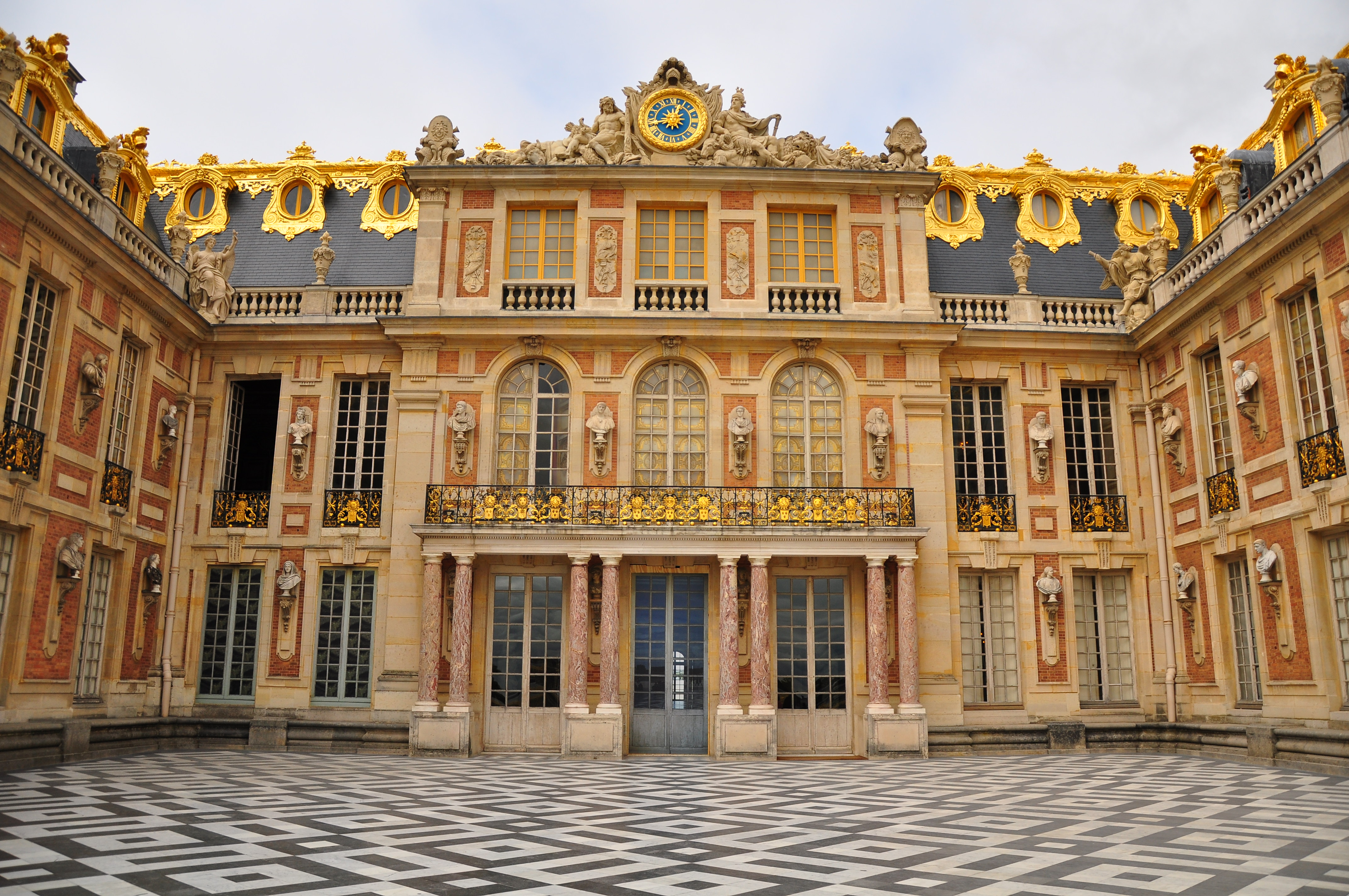
Marble Court of the enlarged château, as modified by Jules Hardouin-Mansart (c. 1680)

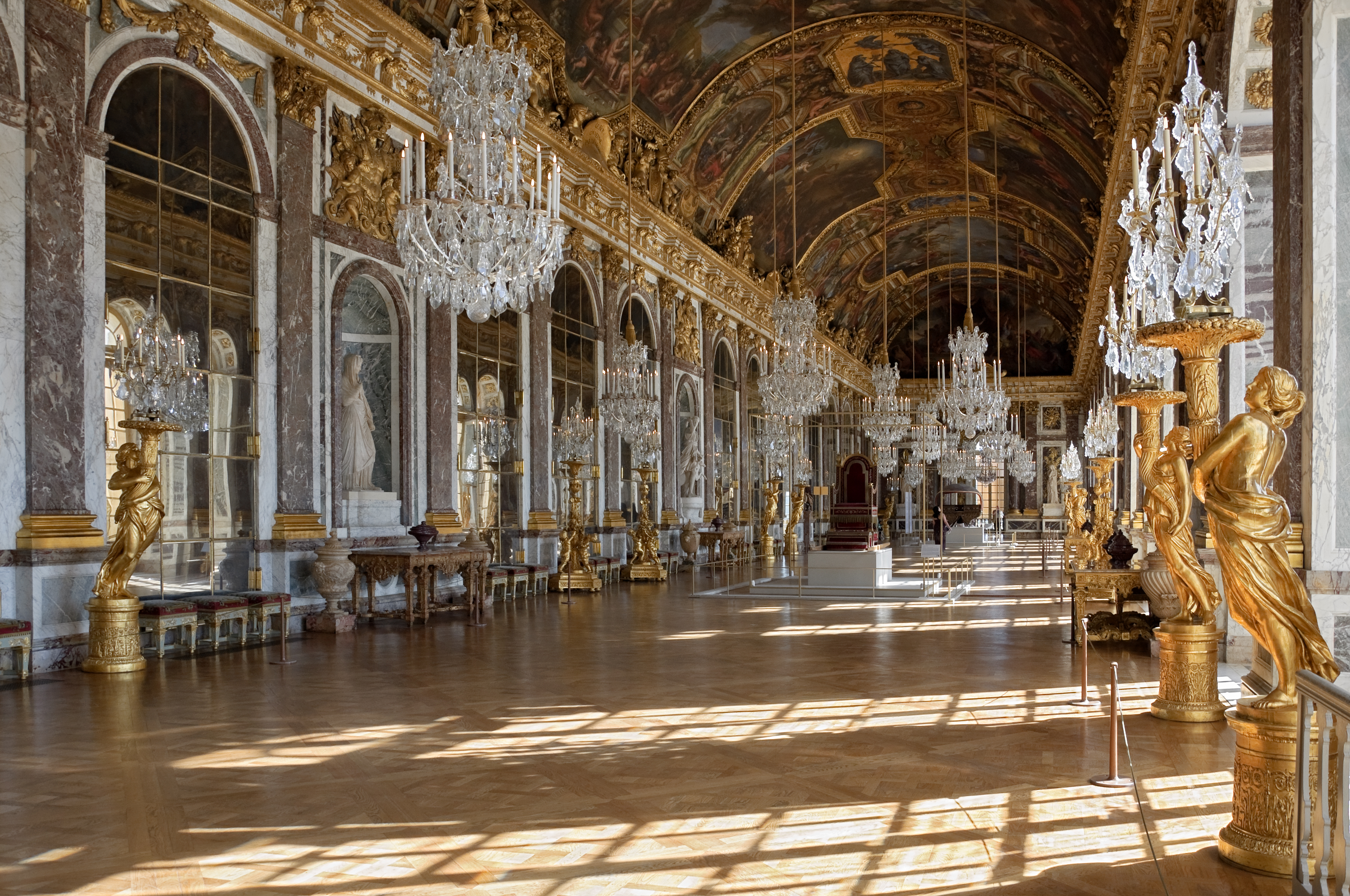
Hall of Mirrors at Palace of Versailles, decorated by Charles Le Brun (1678–1684)

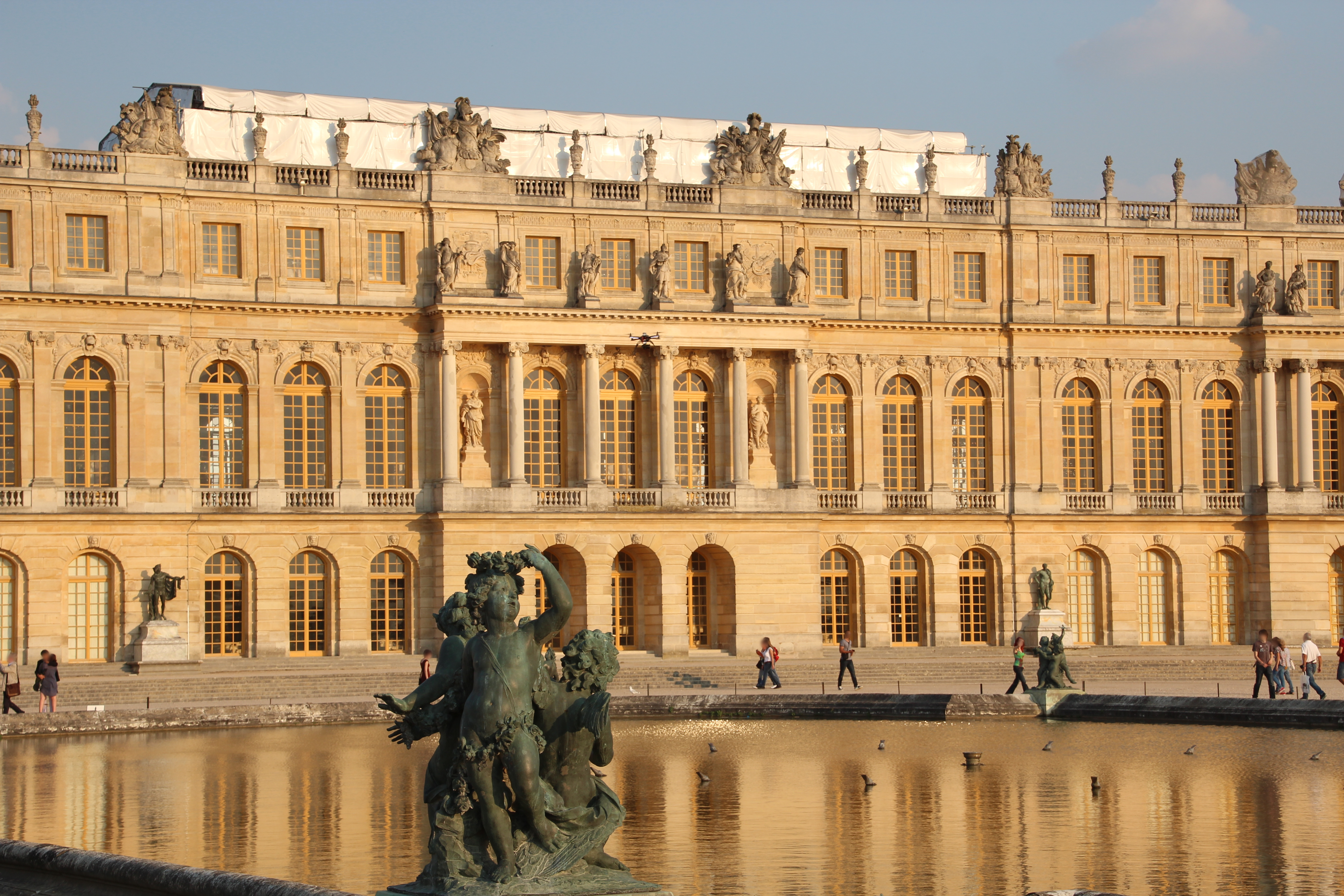
The garden façade by Louis Le Vau (1668–1674) as modified by Jules Hardouin-Mansart (1678–1680)

Louis continued to add to the Palace through the end of his reign. In 1687, Jules Hardouin-Mansart and then Robert de Cotte erected the Grand Trianon, on the model of an Italian building, the Marble Trianon. It had a single floor, decorated with plaster and marble, with a flat roof and balustrade. The plan was very simple, with a peristyle flanked by two wings and two avant-corps, or sections in advance of the wings. It had a simplicity and purity of form that inspired similar palace buildings across Europe, from Prussia to Russia. Mansart also completed the Versailles Orangerie (1684–1686) in a similar style, surrounding a formal garden and pool. The gardens created by André Le Nôtre were designed to complement the architecture of the palace and to express, by it geometric alleys, pools, rows of the trees, flower beds and fountains, the mastery of the King over nature.

The final piece of the Palace was the Chapel, begun in 1689 to the designs of Hardouin-Mansart and completed by Robert de Cotte in 1708–1710. The room was given more space and light by the use of classical columns instead of massive pillars, and by placing the supporting columns on an upper level.

Louis XV continued to add to the Palace, mostly with changes to the interior rooms. His major contribution was the Petit Trianon by Ange-Jacques Gabriel. Its austere architecture was a sign of the transition to Neoclassicism.

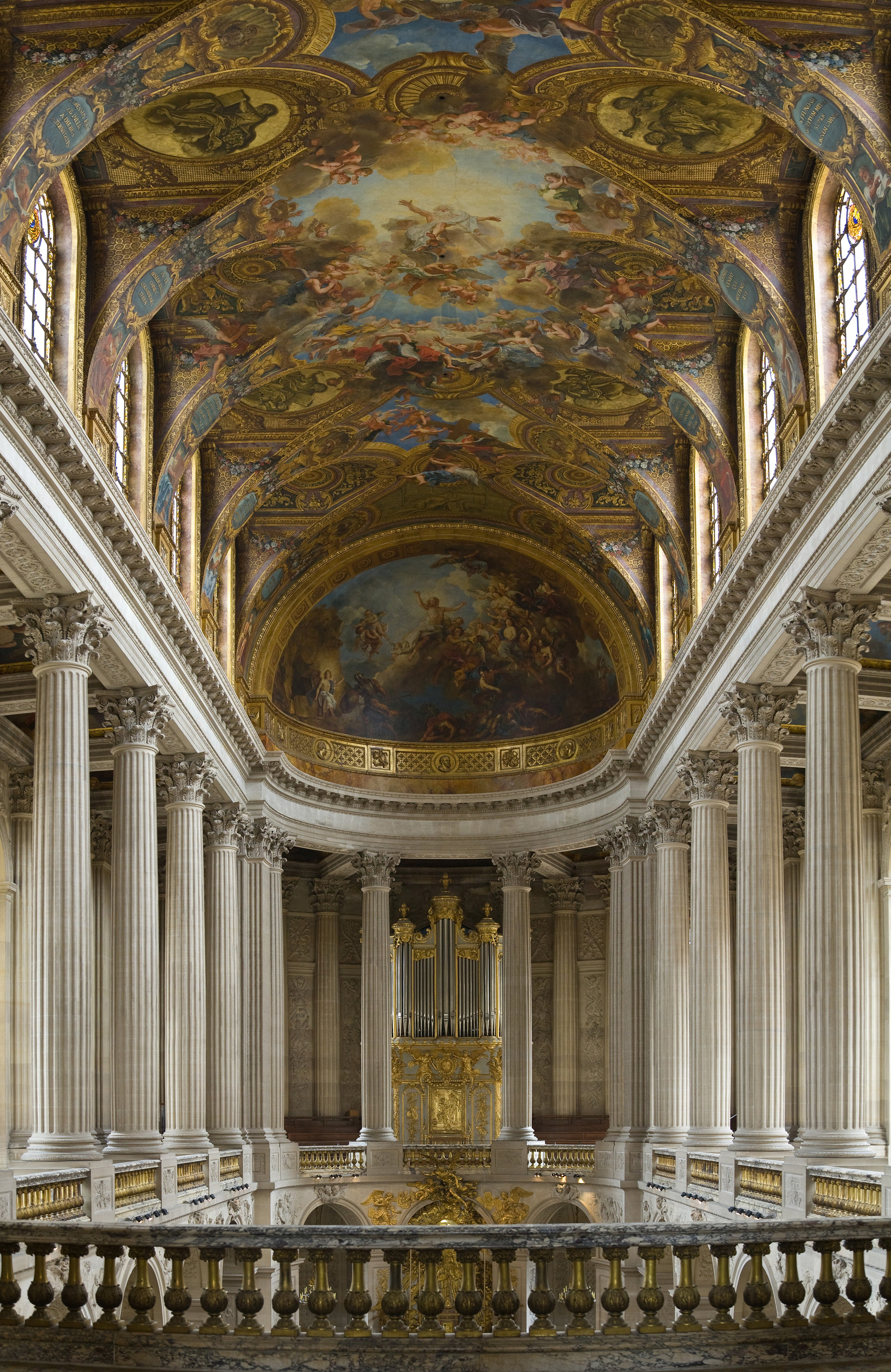
Chapel of the Palace of Versailles by Jules Hardouin-Mansart and Robert de Cotte (1689–1710)

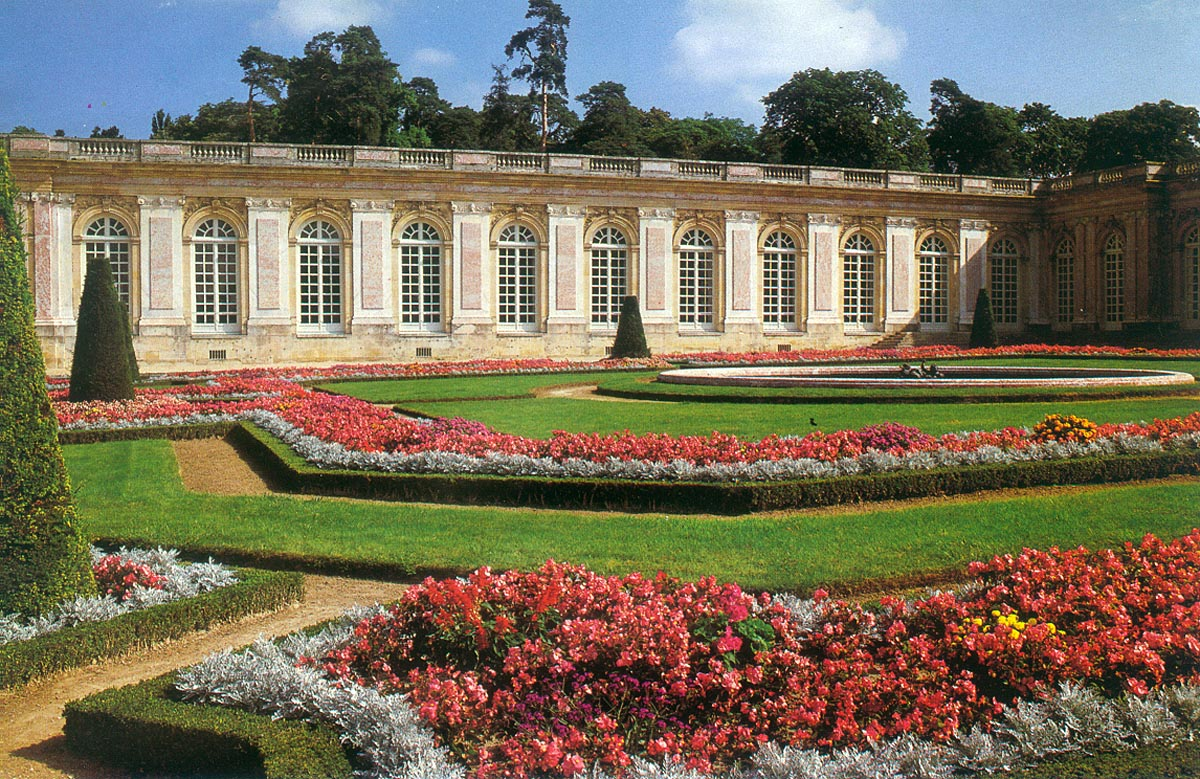
The Grand Trianon by Jules Hardouin-Mansart and Robert de Cotte (1687–88)

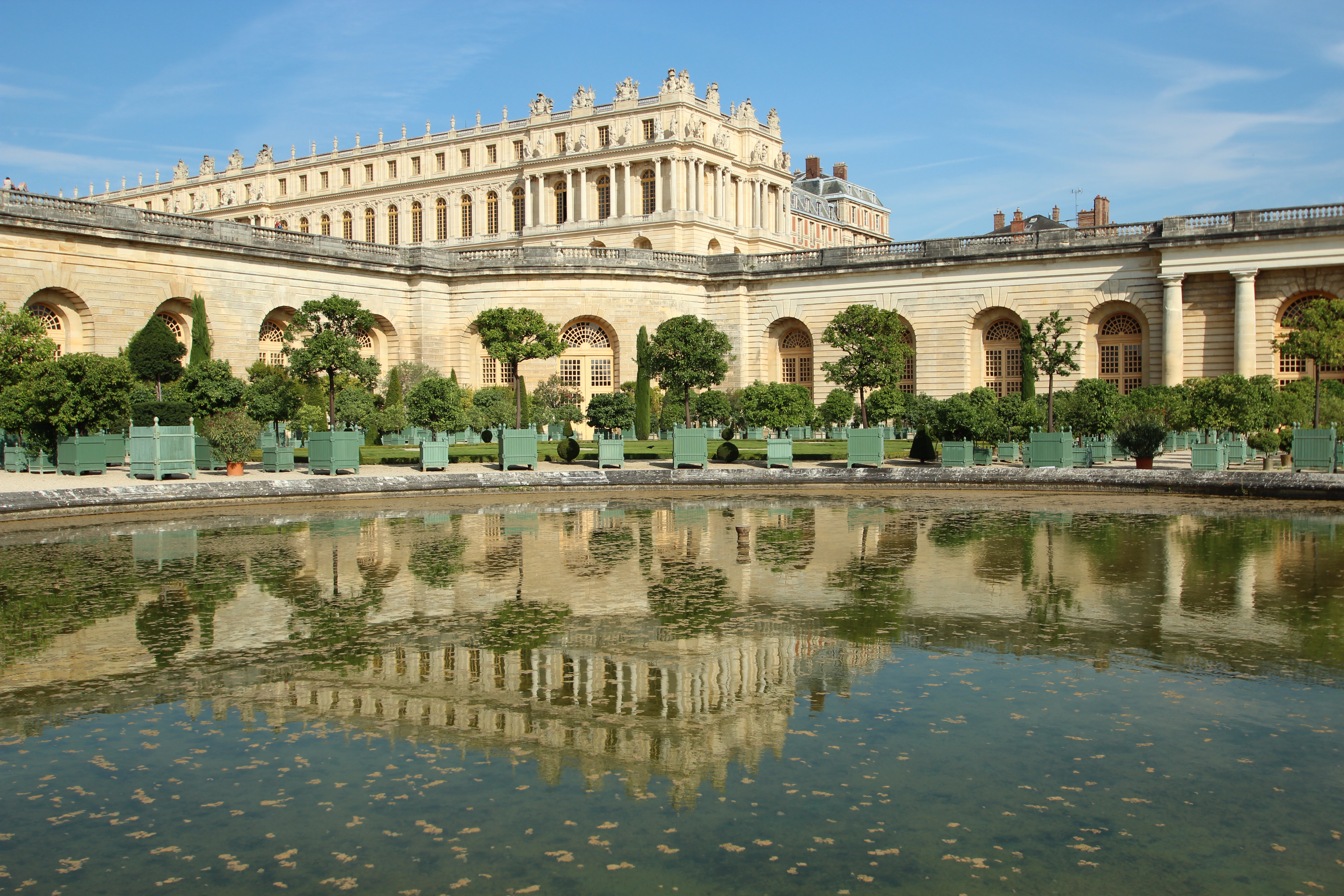
Versailles Orangerie by Jules Hardouin-Mansart

== Religious architecture ==
The architecture of churches during the early French Classicism period evolved more slowly; the late Mannerist Gothic style, exemplified by the Church of Saint-Étienne-du-Mont by Claude Guérin (1606–21), was still the dominant style. However, between 1690 and 1755 twenty-four new church façades were built in Paris. Competitions for new church designs, particularly the Prix de Rome and the competition for the enlarging of Saint-Sulpice and Saint-Eustache in Paris, brought forward many original ideas.

The first French church façade in the new style was for the church of St-Gervais-et-St-Protais (1616) by Salomon de Brosse. Inspired by the Church of the Gesù in Rome, it featured a façade with the three orders of columns, Doric, Ionic and Corinthian, arranged in stages one above the other. Another variant of the new style appeared in the main Jesuit church in Paris, the Church of Saint-Paul-Saint-Louis, also inspired by the Church of the Gesù. Designed by the Jesuit architects Etienne Martellange and François Derand, had two levels, with the lower level at the height of the chapels, and an upper level, with a second order of columns, and a fronton over the portal of the church. The upper level was supported by consoles in a reversed S form. The surface of the facade was decorated with statues in niches, and with renouncements. The interior plan was rectangual, with a large vaulted nave, flanked with chapels.

The interiors of new parish churches, such as Saint-Sulpice, Saint-Louis-en-l'Île and Saint-Roch largely followed the traditional gothic floor-plan of Notre-Dame, though they did add façades and certain other decorative features from the Italian Baroque. Saint-Roch (1653–90), designed by Jacques Lemercier, had a Gothic plan but colorful Italian-style decoration. To follow the advice of the Council of Trent to integrate themselves into the city's architecture, new churches were aligned with the street. rather than always facing east–west.

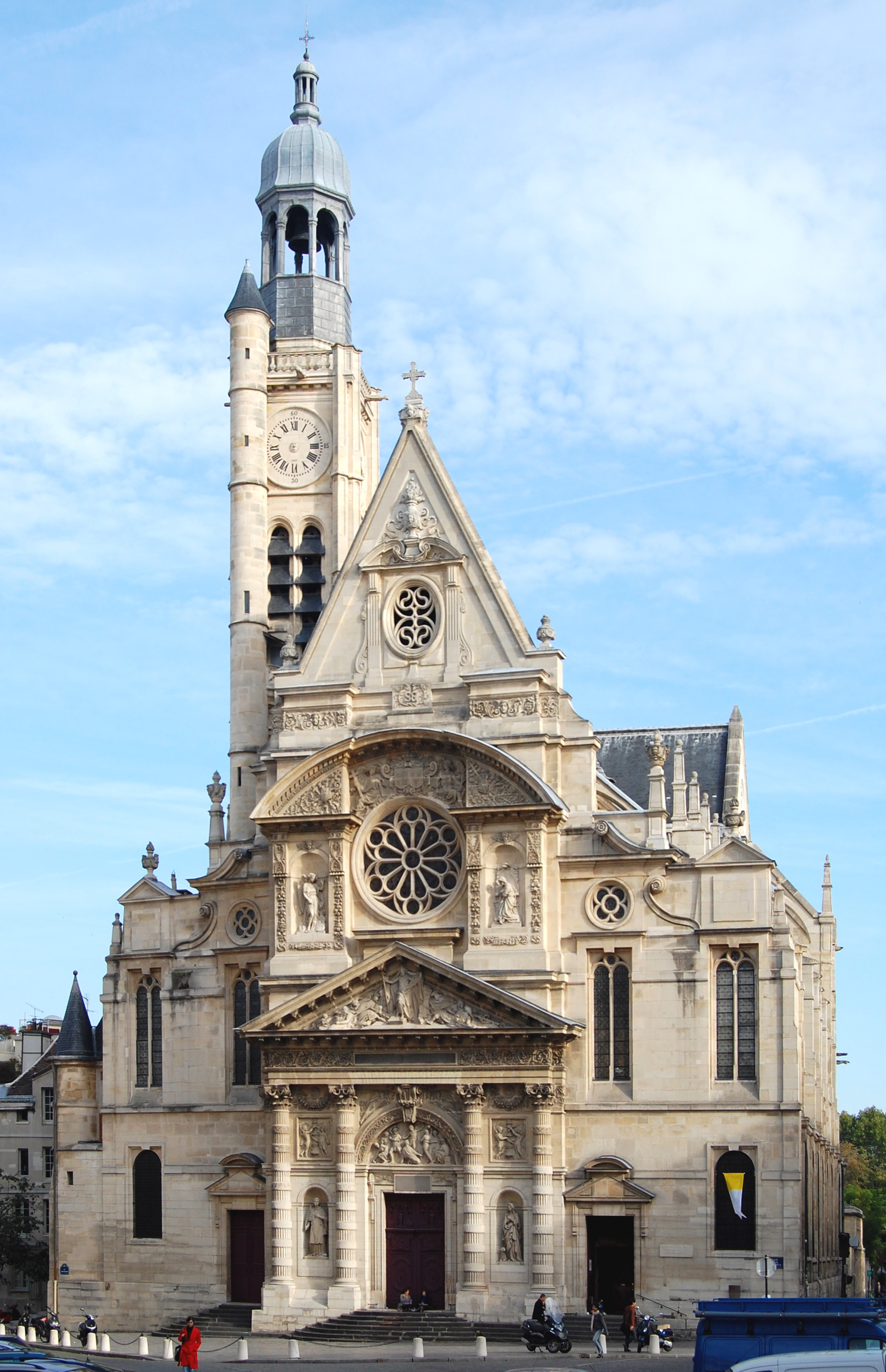
The church of Saint-Étienne-du-Mont by Claude Guérin, in the late Mannerist Gothic style (1606–21)

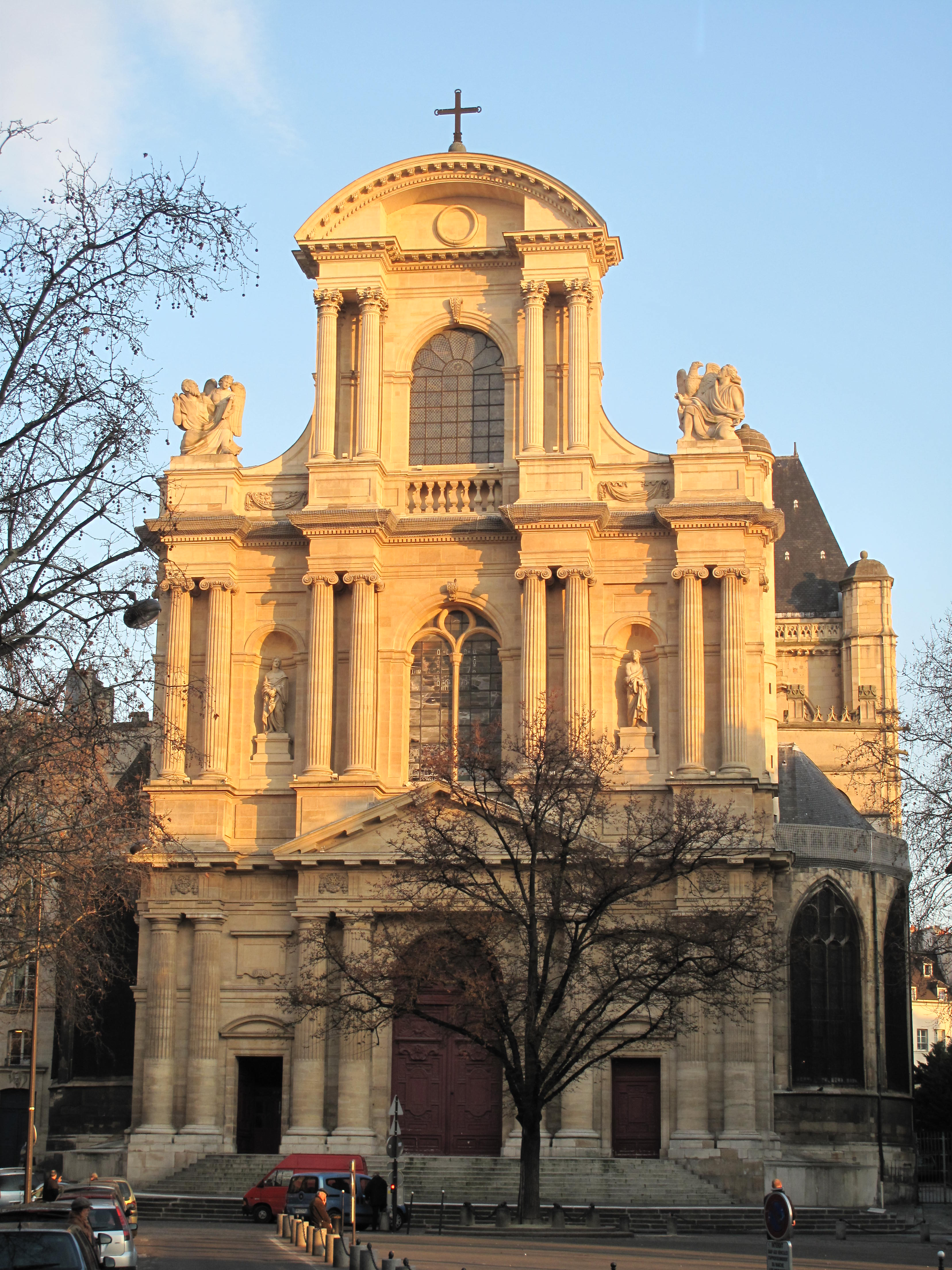
The Church of St-Gervais-et-St-Protais, the first Paris church with a façade in the new Baroque style (1616–20)

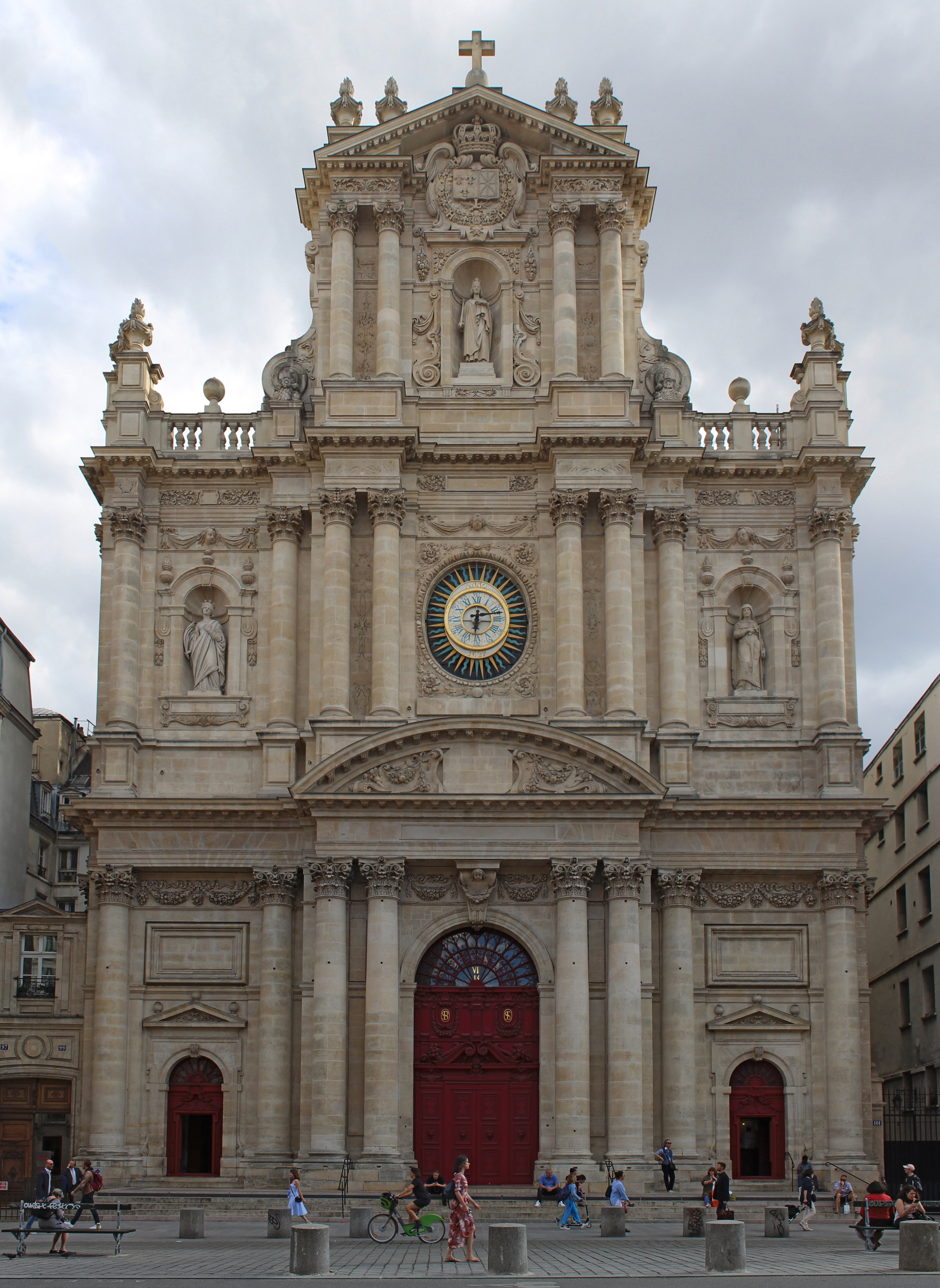
The Church of Saint-Paul-Saint-Louis (1627–41) by Etienne Martellange and François Derand

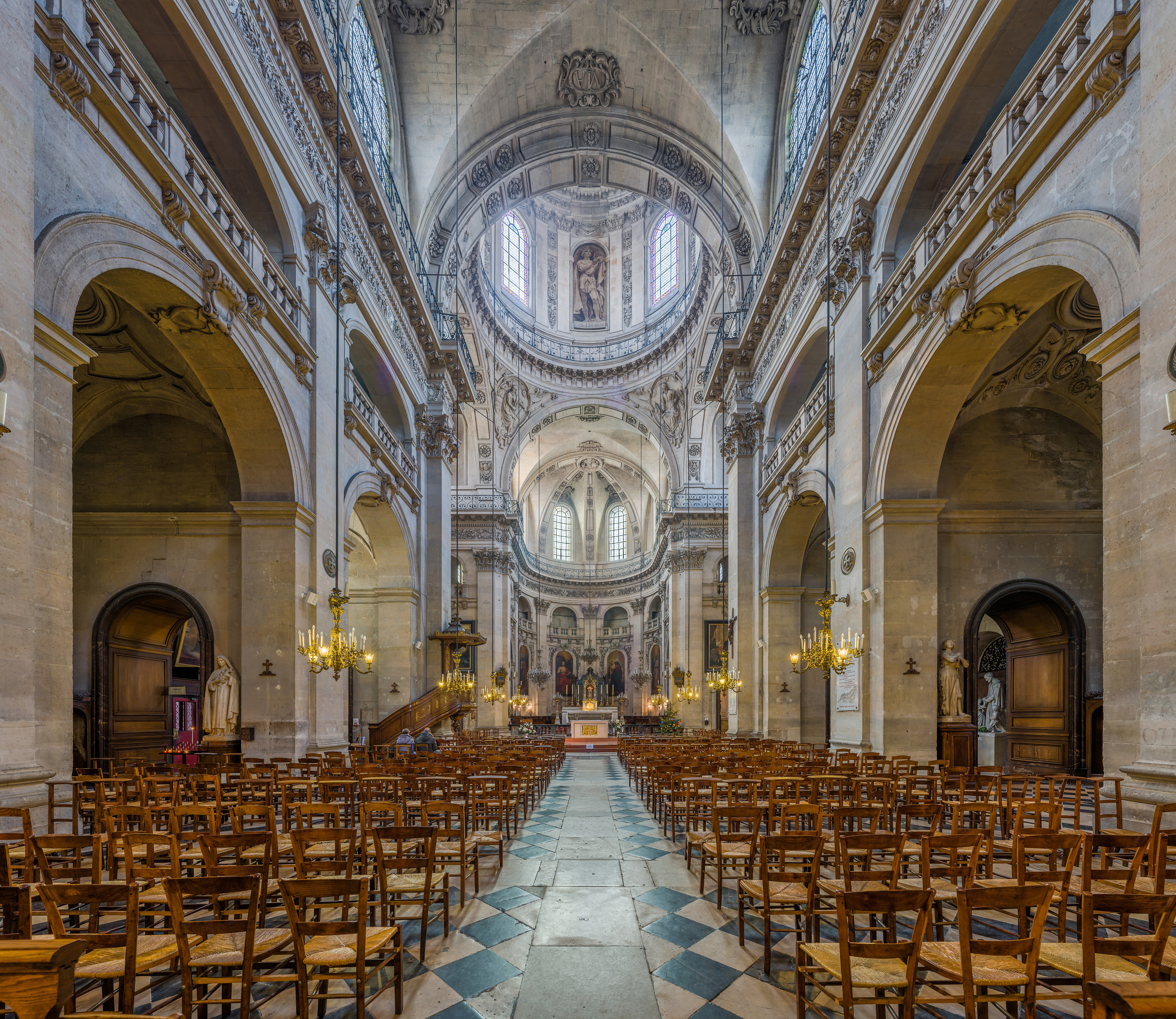
Interior of Saint-Paul-Saint-Louis (1627–41)

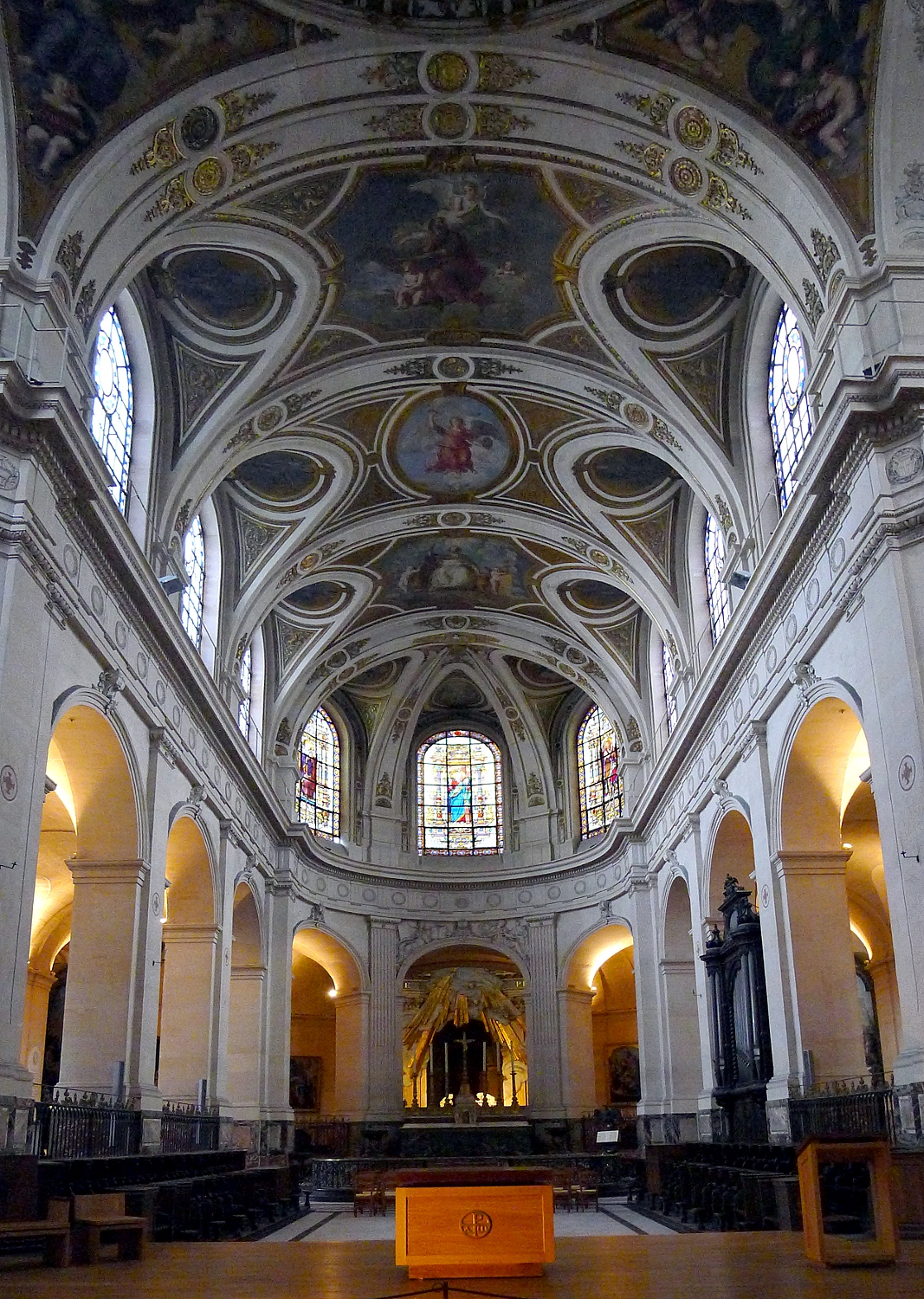
Church of Saint-Roch (1653–90) by Jacques Lemercier

== The debut of the dome ==
The major innovation of French Baroque religious architecture was the introduction of the cupola or dome over the central nave, a style imported from the Italian Baroque. The dome of the Church of the Gesù in Rome, by Giacomo della Porta (1568–1584) served as the prototype. The first Parisian church to have a dome was the chapel of the whose façade is now found in the courtyard of the École nationale supérieure des Beaux-Arts on rue Bonaparte in Paris. The next, larger dome was constructed at the Église Saint-Joseph-des-Carmes (1613–20) in the same neighborhood. A larger and still more impressive early dome was built by François Mansart for the Church the Visitation Saint-Marie (1632–34).

Another innovative dome was built by Jacques Lemercier for the College of Sorbonne, beginning in 1635. This design featured a hemispherical dome on a tall octagonal drum, the first of its type in France, with four small cupolas in the angles of the Greek cross above the Corinthian order columns on the façade.

A much larger and higher dome on the Italian Baroque model was begun by François Mansart, then Jacques Lemercier and completed by Pierre Le Muet for the chapel of the royal hospital and abbey of Val-de-Grace (1645–1665). The façade has two levels of columns and pediments and a peristyle of detached columns, and the dome is decorated with an abundance of vaults, ribs, statues, contreforts, and ornaments, making it the most Italianate of French domes.

The second part of the 17th century saw the beginning of two more important domes. The Chapel of the Collège des Quatre-Nations, (now the Institut de France by Louis Le Vau and François d'Orbay (1662–1668) was built with a bequest from Cardinal Mazarin across the Seine from Louvre, and contains his tomb. The grandest of the domes was that of Les Invalides, the chapel for the hospital of military veterans, built by Jules Hardouin-Mansart (1677–1706), both as a symbol of charity and of military glory. The dome is placed on a church in the form of a trek cross. The cube of the building is surmounted by a cylindrical column of two drums, giving the dome exceptional height. The dome itself is richly decorated with sculpture on the entablements as well as ornaments of gilded bronze between the vertical ribs of the dome.

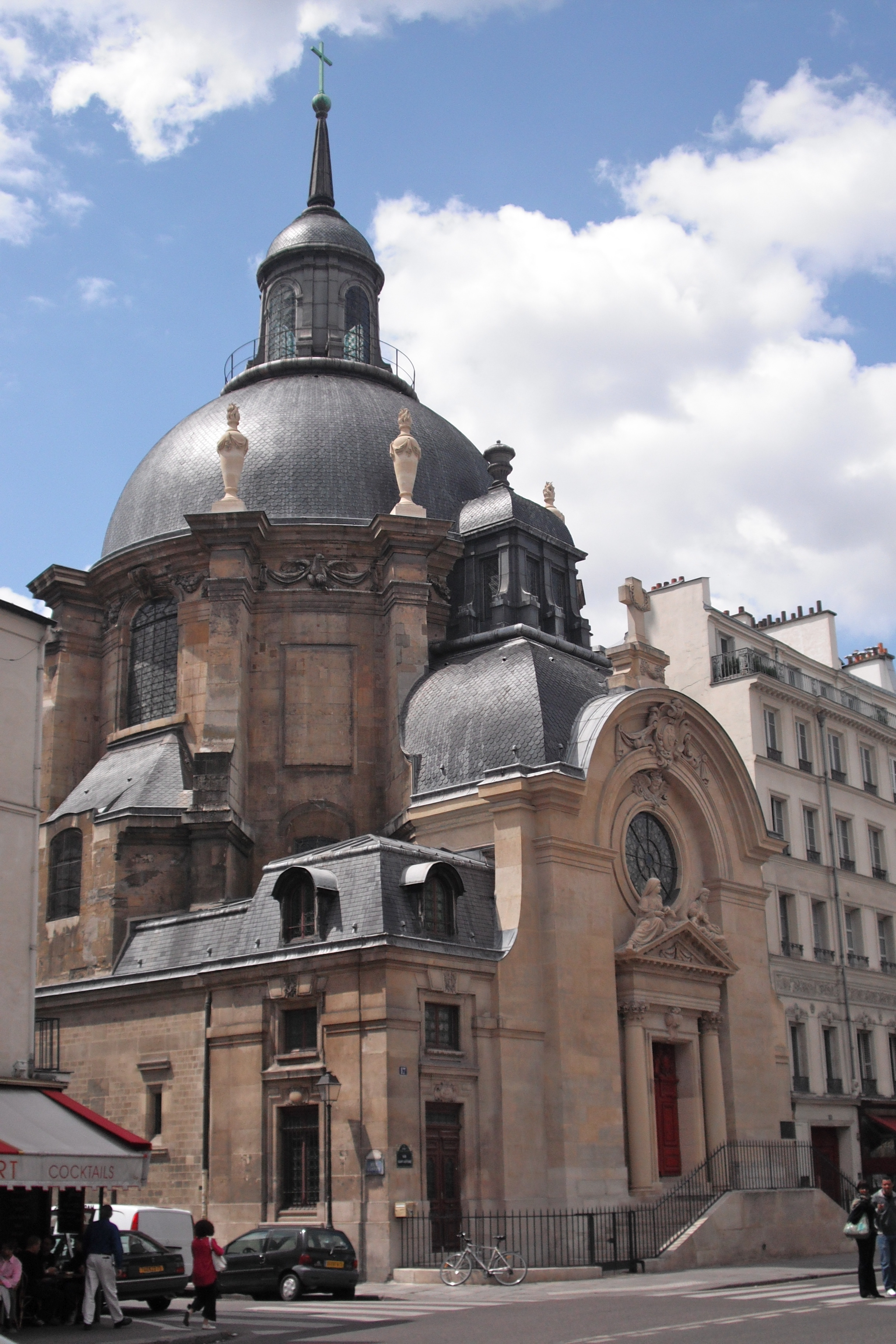
Church of the Convent of the Visitation by François Mansart (1632–34)

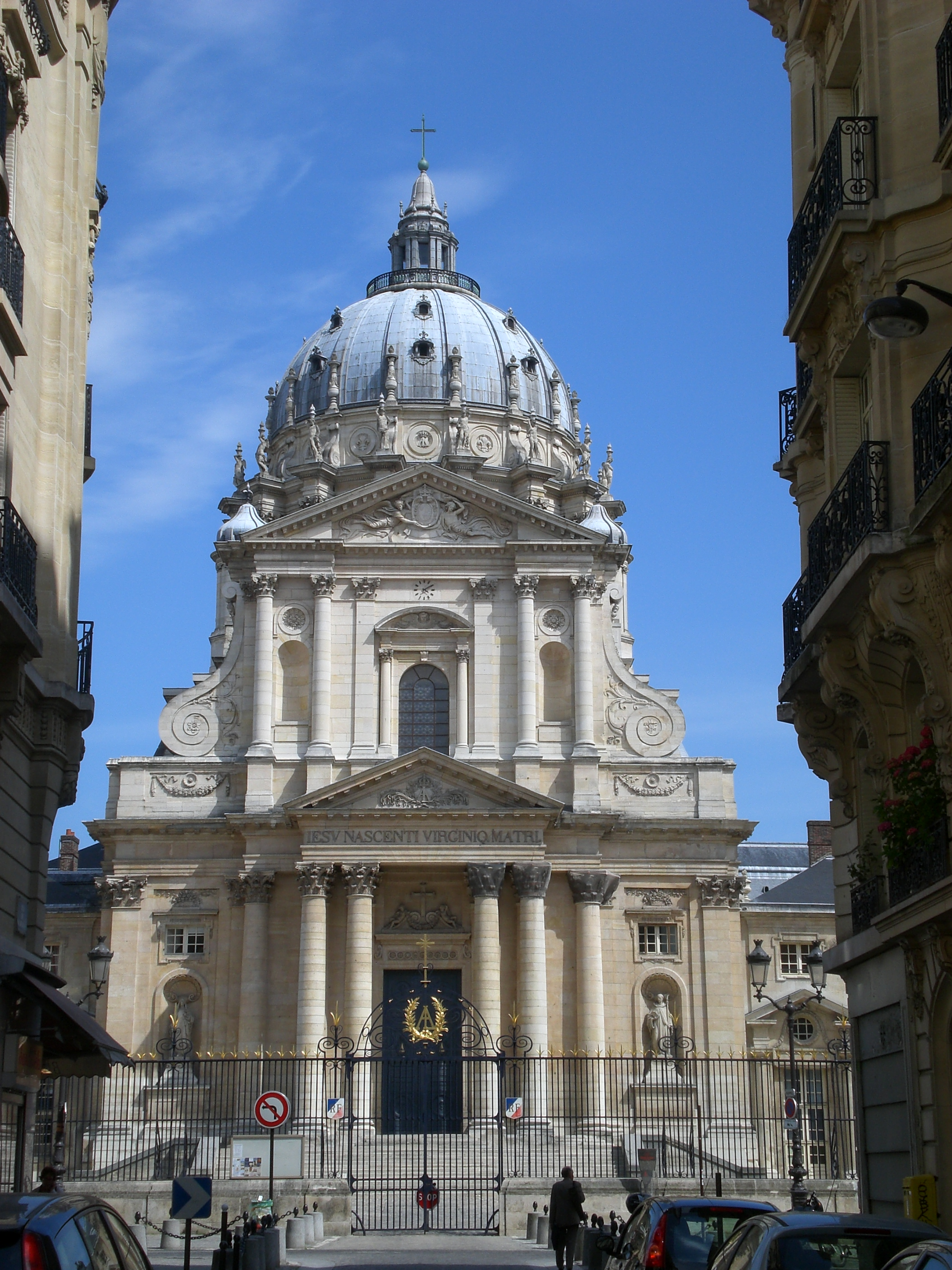
Church of Val de Grace by François Mansart, Jacques Lemercier, and Pierre Le Muet (1624–1669)

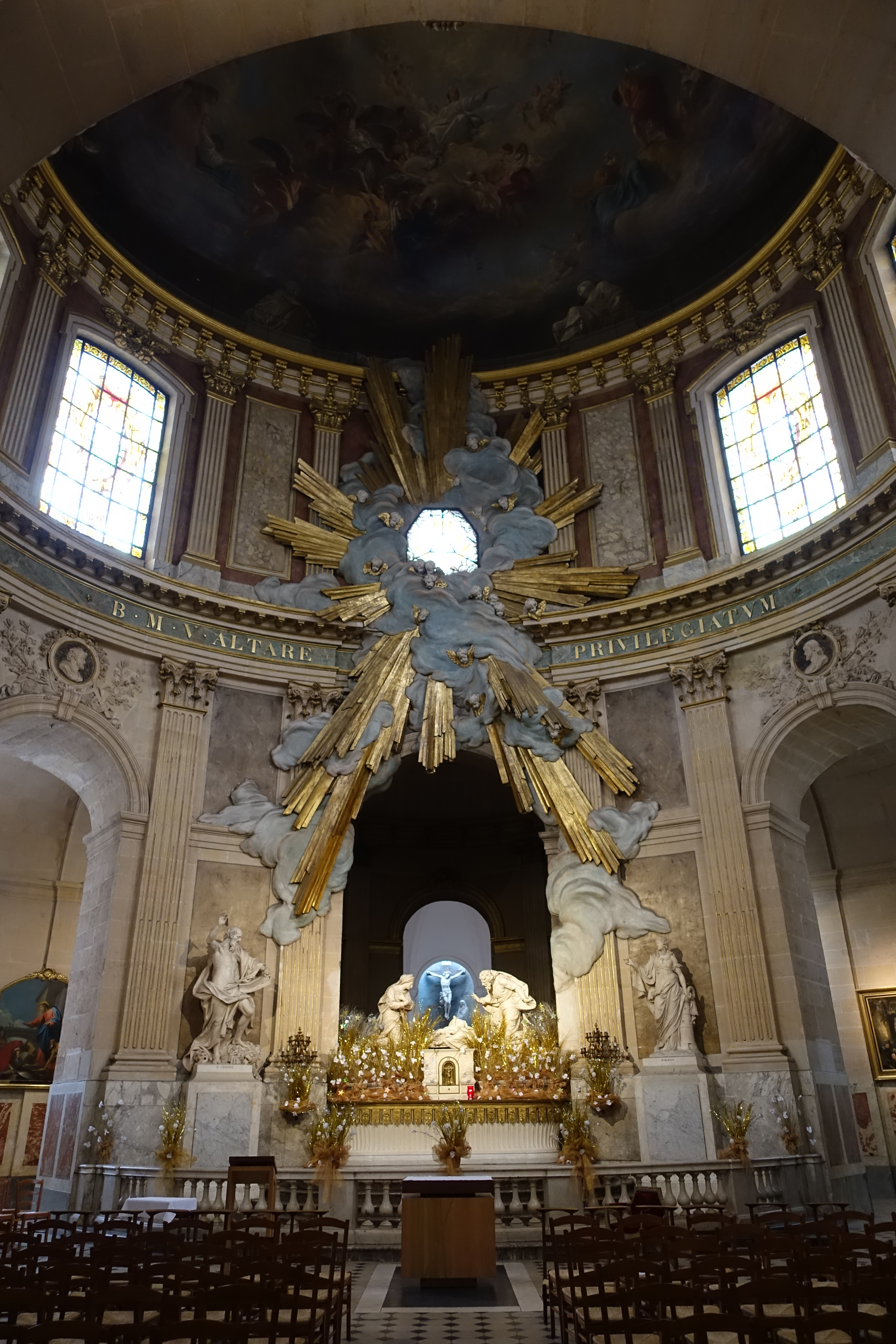
Eglise Saint-Roch, Paris by Jacques Lemercier (1653–90)

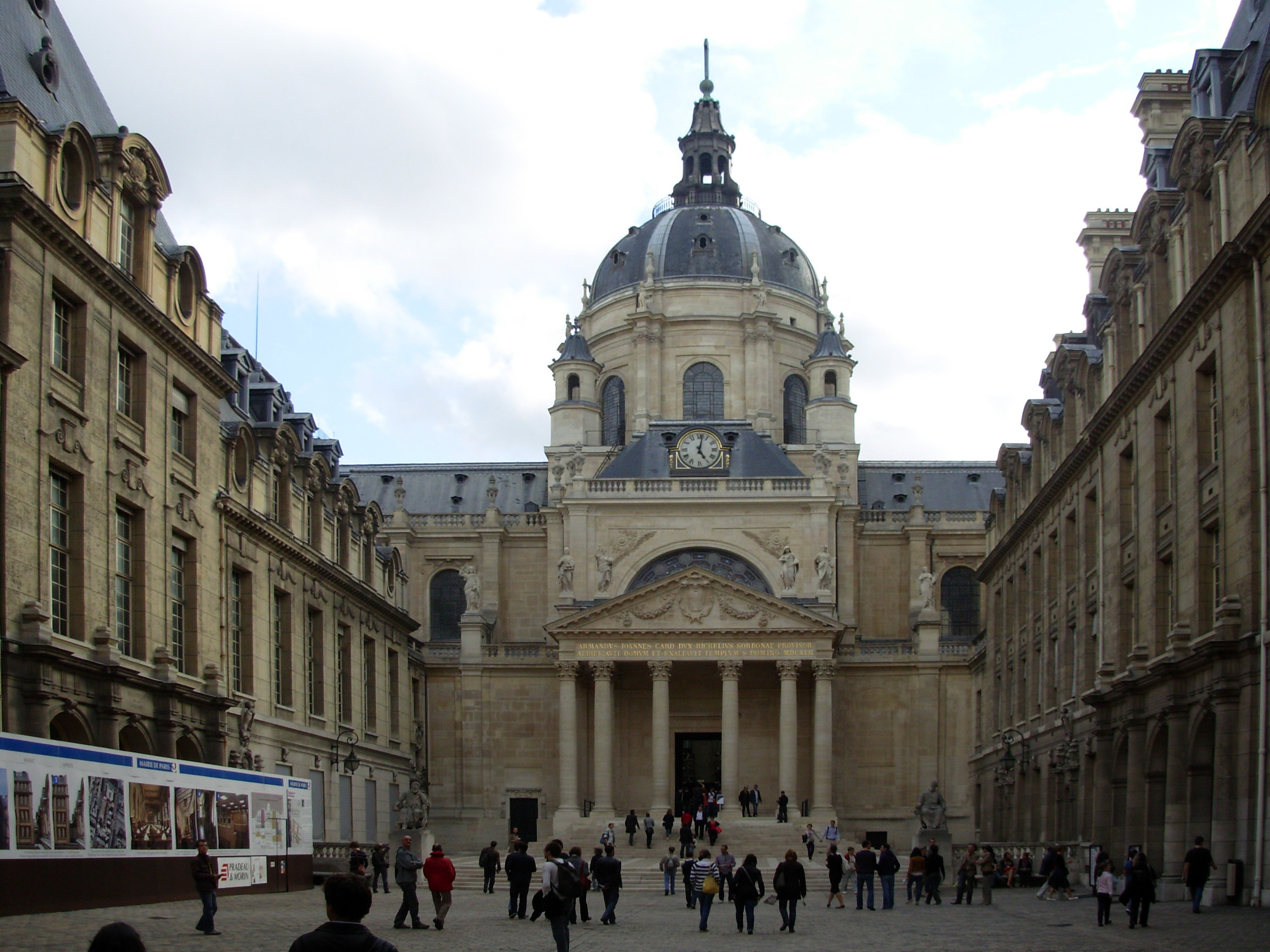
Chapel of the College of Sorbonne by Jacques Lemercier (1635– )

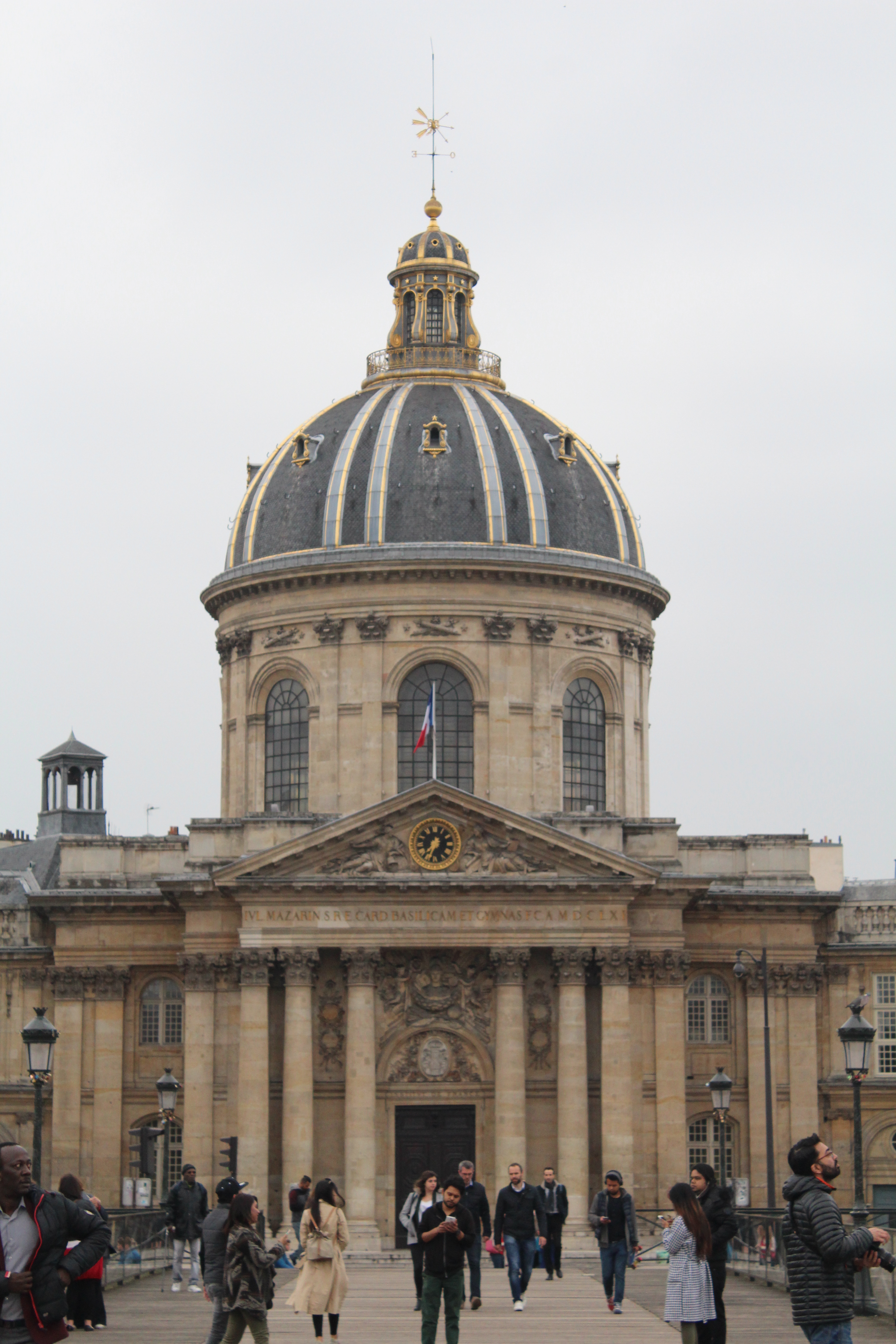
Collége des Quatres-Nations by Louis Le Vau and François d'Orbay (1662–1668)

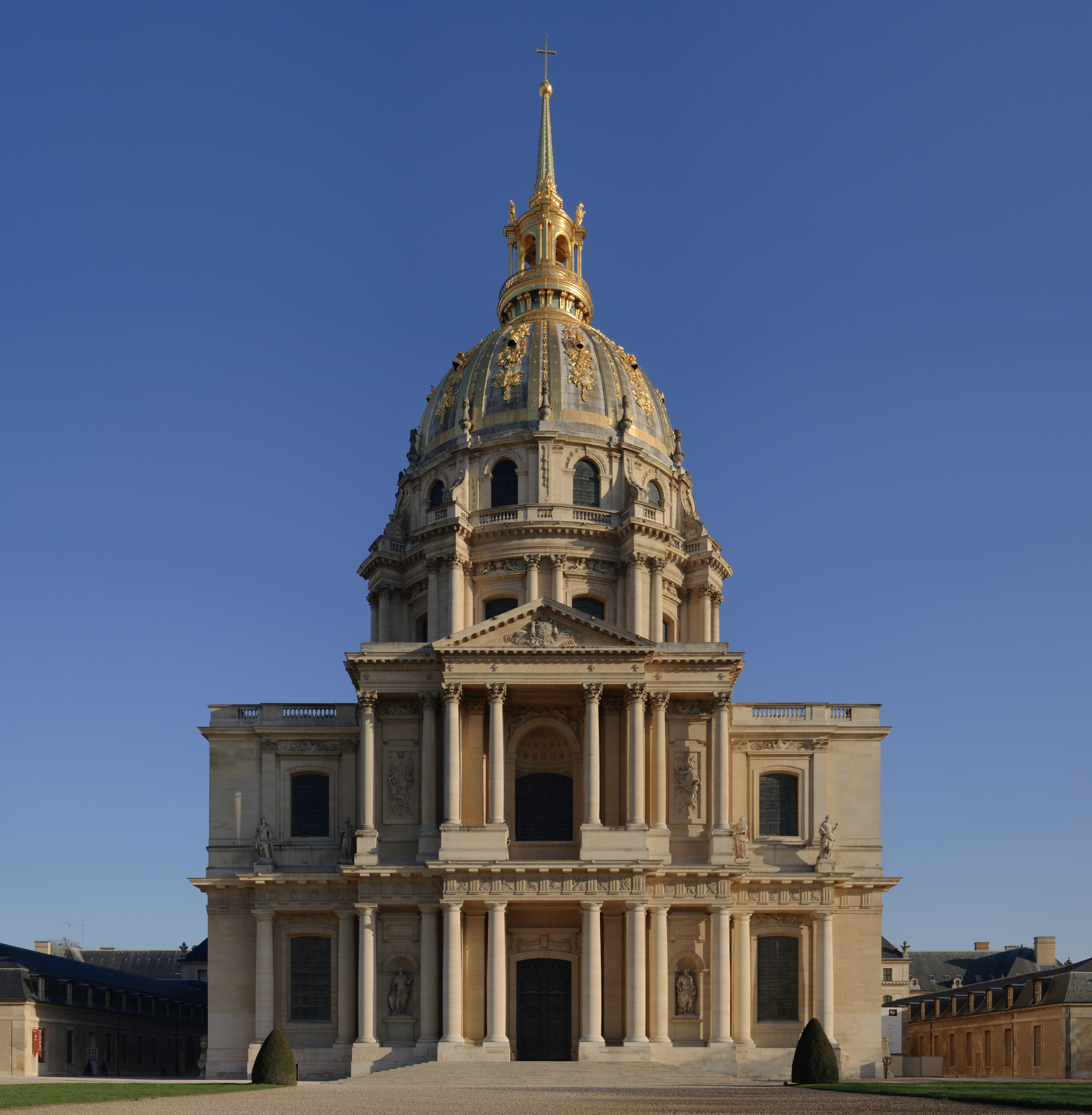
Les Invalides by Jules Hardouin-Mansart (1677–1706)

== Residential architecture – the hôtel particulier ==
The residential building style known as the hôtel particulier reached its maturity during the Baroque era, particularly in Paris, where members of the nobility built their town houses. They were defined by Nicolas Catherinot in the Traité de l'architecture (1688) as "less beautiful than palaces and more beautiful than simple residences." The early hôtels particuliers in Paris were influenced partly by Italian architecture and the model of the Luxembourg Palace, on a smaller scale. The early Baroque hôtel particulier was usually placed between a walled courtyard in the front and a garden in the back, with the entrance to the courtyard through a pavilion on the street. The Hôtel de Sully (1624–1630) in Paris, designed by Jean Androuet du Cerceau, is a good example of the early style, as is the Hôtel Carnavalet. While the Hôtel de Sully was originally planned to be built of brick and stone, it was finally built entirely of stone. The hôtels grew in size and complexity through the 17th century, with the appearance of the vestibule between 1635 and 1640. The newer houses also began to have two courtyards, one for ceremony (the cour d'honneur) and the other for more practical purposes, such as the stables. The façade of the residential building facing the garden came to occupy the entire width of the piece of land. New specialized kinds of rooms, such as dining rooms and salons, began to appear. Notable examples of the French Baroque hôtels particuliers include the Hôtel Carnavalet, the Hôtel de Sully, the Hôtel de Beauvais (1655–1660), and the Hôtel de Soubise (1624–1639) (now occupied by the French National Archives). A notable example outside of Paris is the Palais Rohan, Strasbourg.

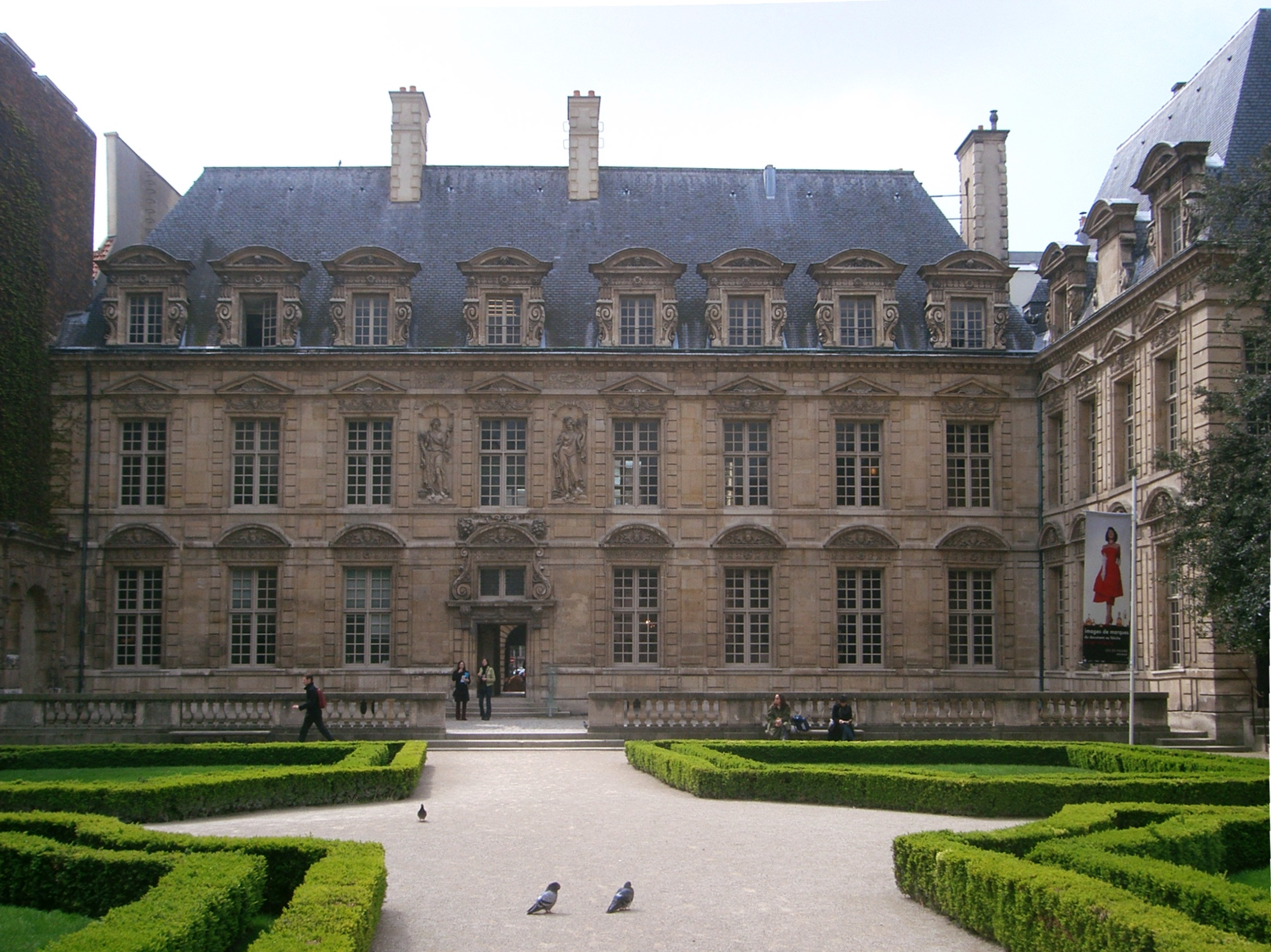
Hôtel de Sully (1624–1639)

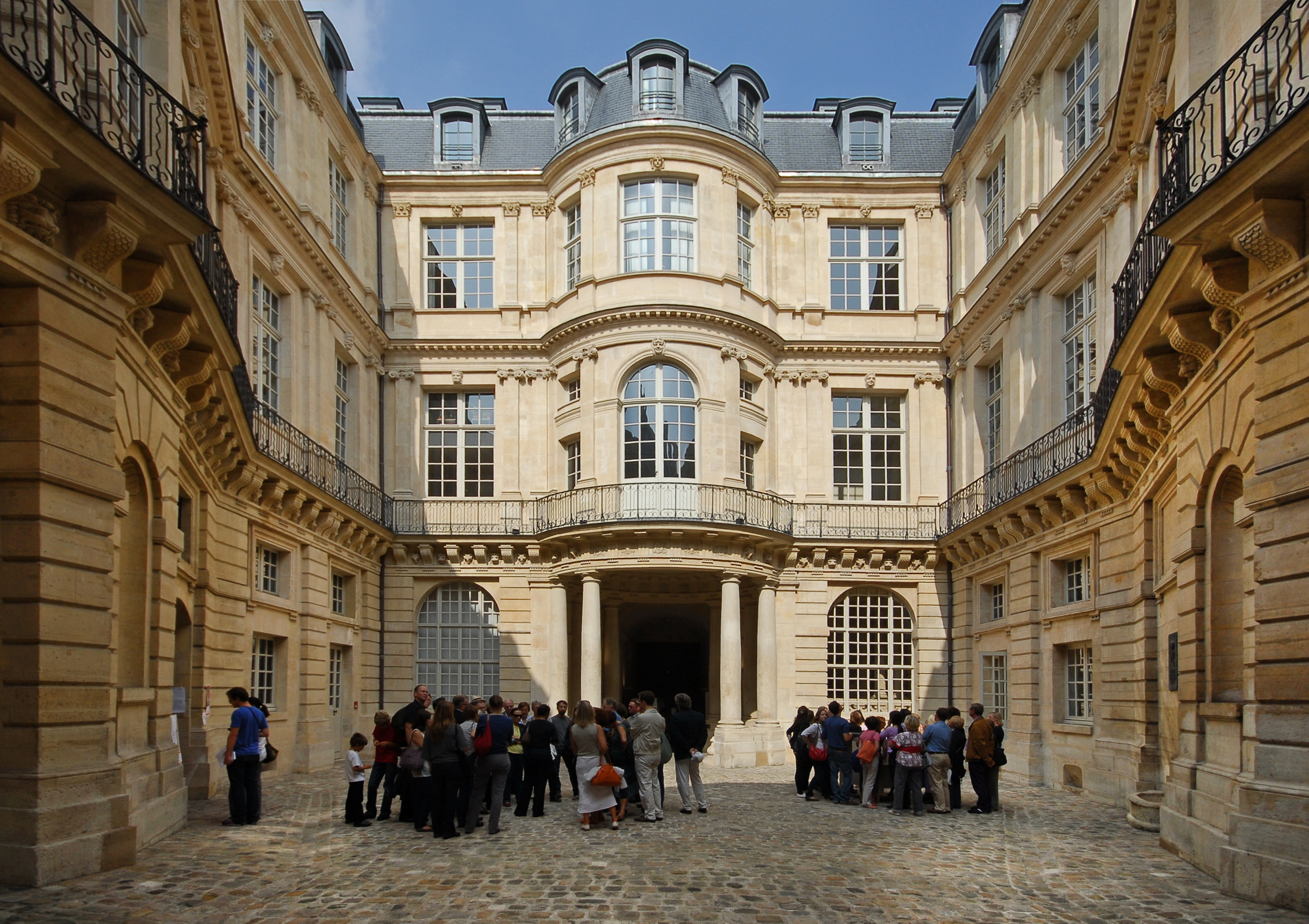
Hôtel de Beauvais (1655–1660)

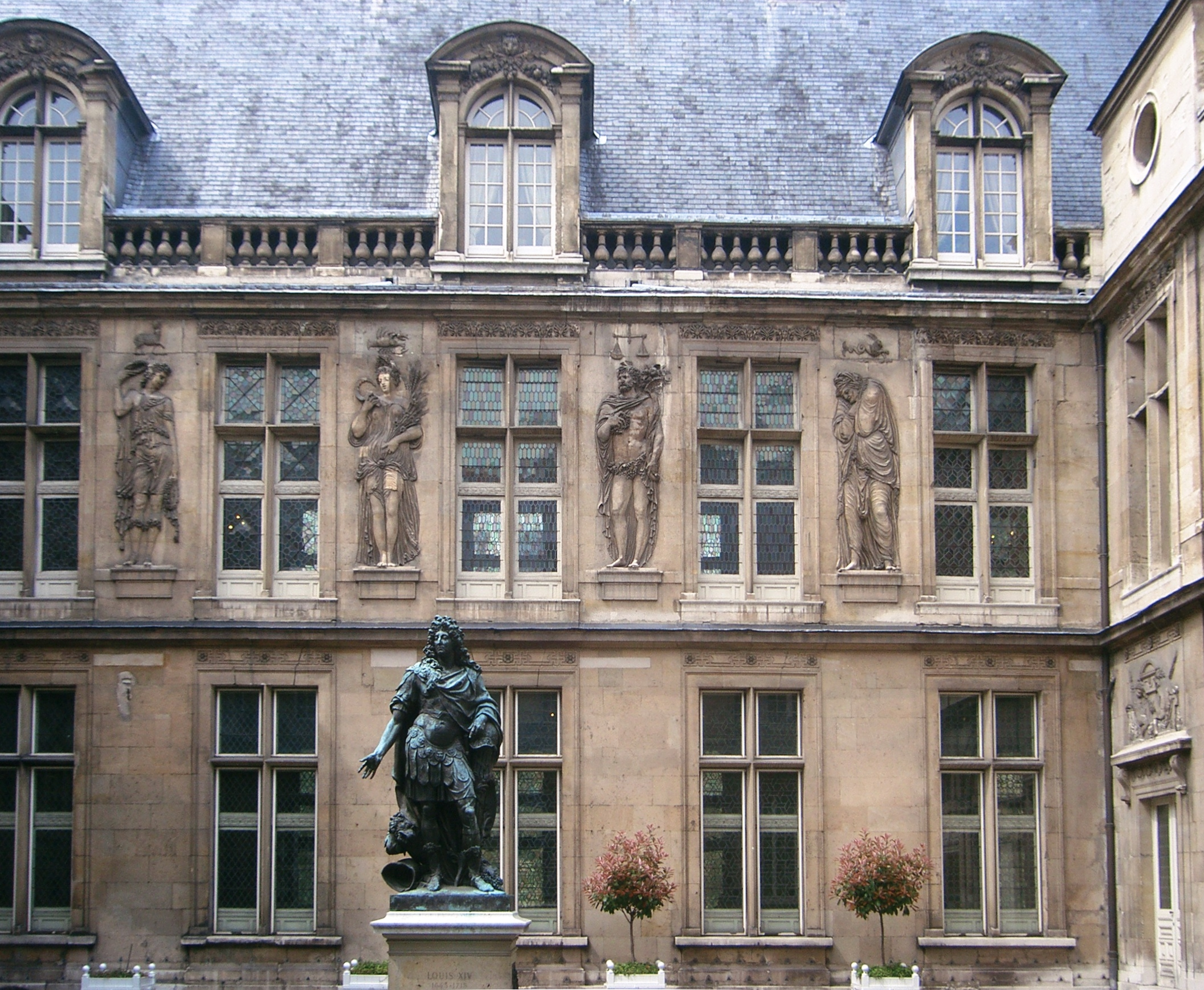
Hôtel Carnavalet

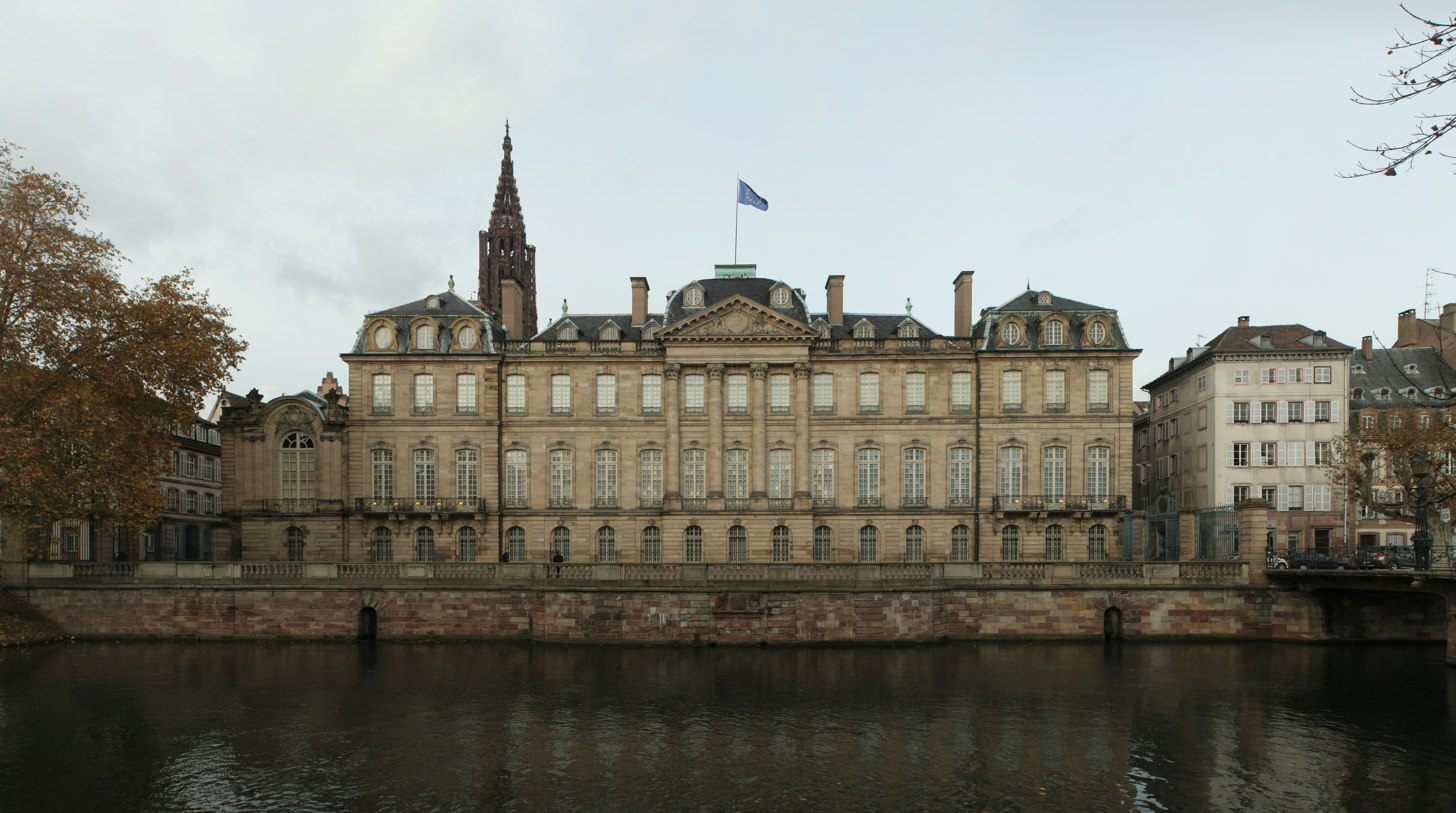
The Palais Rohan, Strasbourg

== The residential square ==
The residential square, a group of houses with of identical size and identical architecture around a square, usually with a fountain in the middle, first based on the Italian model, appeared in Paris in the Place Royal (now Place des Vosges) between 1605 and 1613. The buildings had high mansard roofs, and tricolor facades of broke, stone, and slate. In the beginning, a statue of Louis XIII on horseback was placed in the center. A smaller square, Place Dauphine, originally with thirty-two houses, was built on the Île de la Cité next to the Pont Neuf between 1607 and 1610. It faced an equestrian statue of Henry IV of France.

The next major urban square constructed in Paris was the Place des Victoires (1684–1697), a real estate development of seven large buildings in three segments around an oval square, with a monument to Louis XIV at its center. This was built by an enterprising entrepreneur and nobleman of the court, Jean-Baptiste Prédot, combined with the architect Jules Hardouin-Mansart. The new square was a showcases of the new monumental Louis XIV style. The old brick and stone of the Henry IV squares was replaced by the Grand Style of monumental columns, which usually were part of the façade itself, rather than standing separately. All the buildings around the square were connected and built to the same height, in the same style. The ground floor featured a covered arcade for pedestrians.

Between 1699 and 1702, another square was constructed also by Hardouin-Mansart. the Place Vendôme, In another innovation, this project was partially financed by the sale of lots around the square. All of these projects featured monumental façades in the Louis XIV style, giving a particular harmony to the squares.

Louis XV followed the example of Louis XIV. In the later years of his reign, Louis constructed a major new square in the center of the city, Place Louis XV (now Place de la Concorde, with a harmonious row of new buildings designed by Ange-Jacques Gabriel. Following the example of the earlier squares, it featured an equestrian statue of Louis XV, which was pulled down during the French Revolution. Louis XV built other monumental squares following the same architectural model in the centers of Rennes and Bordeaux. Another notable square, Place Stanislas, was built in the city of Nancy, in Lorraine, shortly before that duchy was formally attached to France.

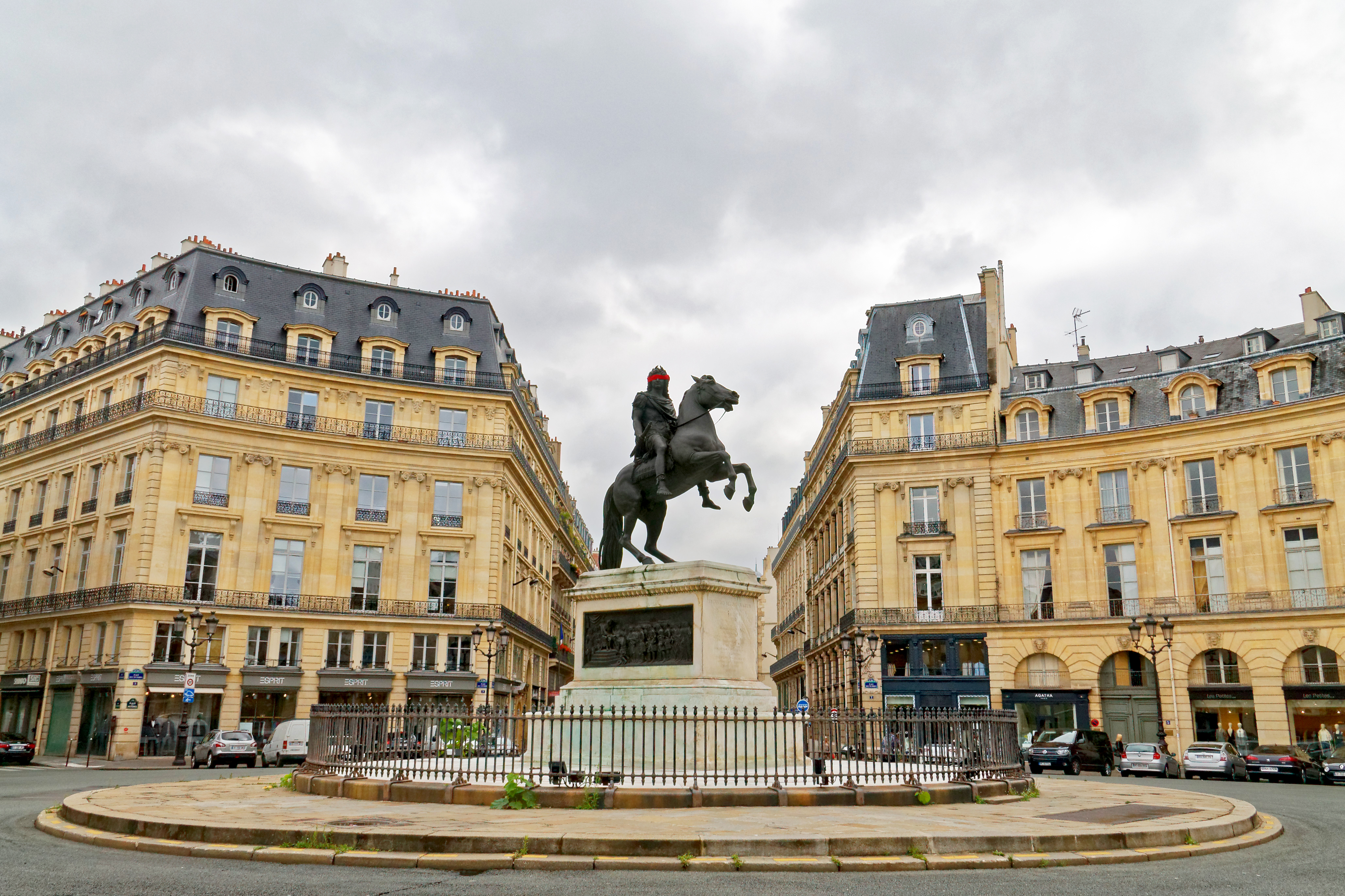
Place des Victoires (1684–1697) by Jules Hardouin-Mansart

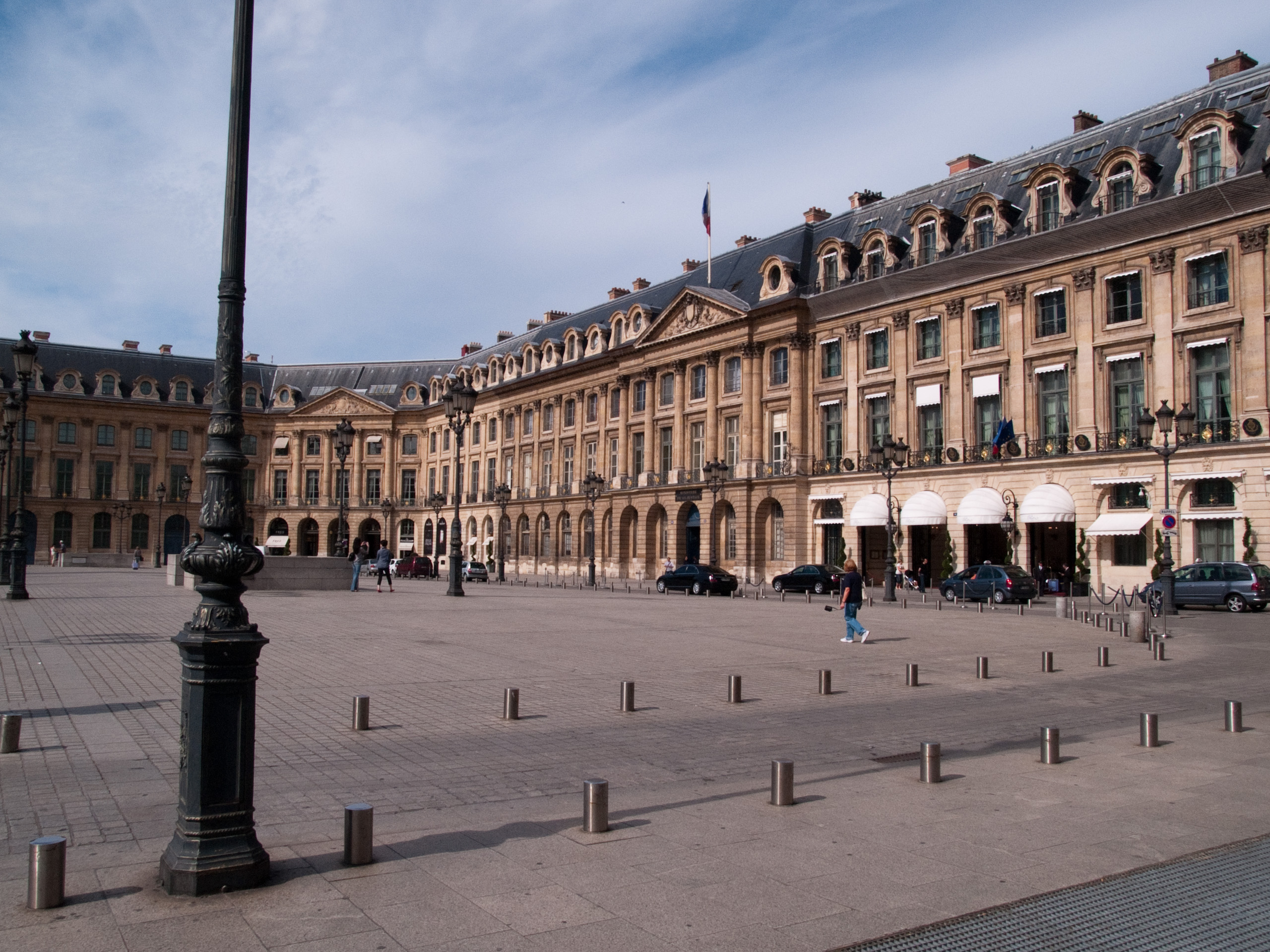
Place Vendôme (1699–1702) by Jules Hardouin-Mansart

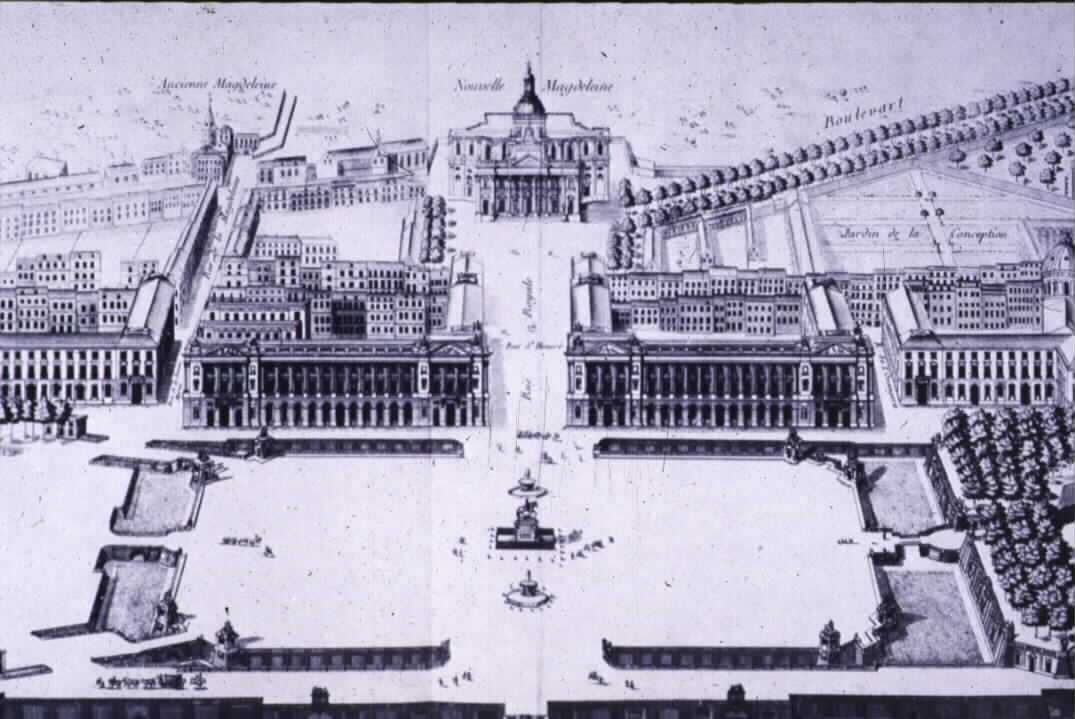
Design for the Place Louis XV by Ange-Jacques Gabriel (1758)

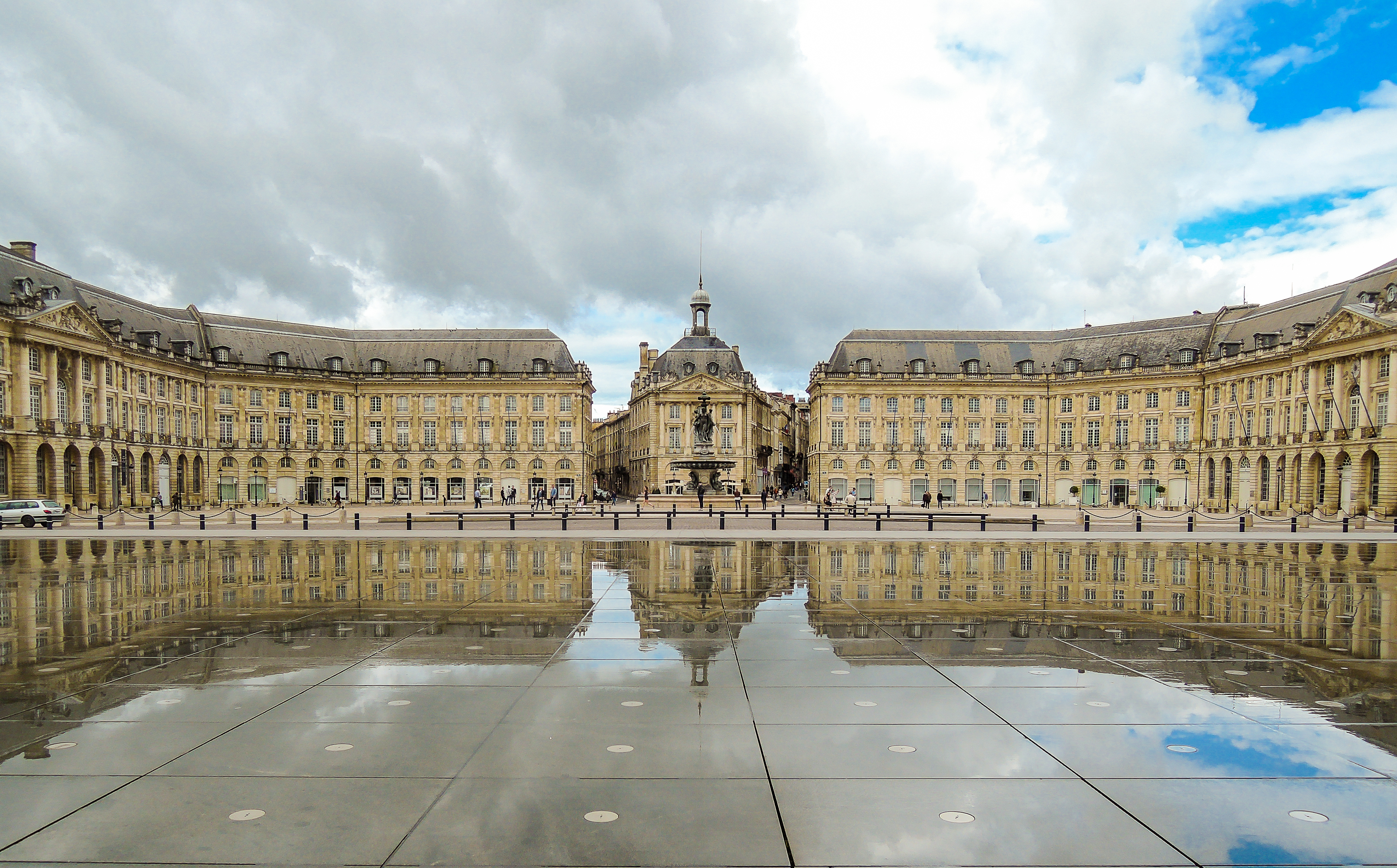
Place de la Bourse in Bordeaux by Ange-Jacques Gabriel (1730–1775)

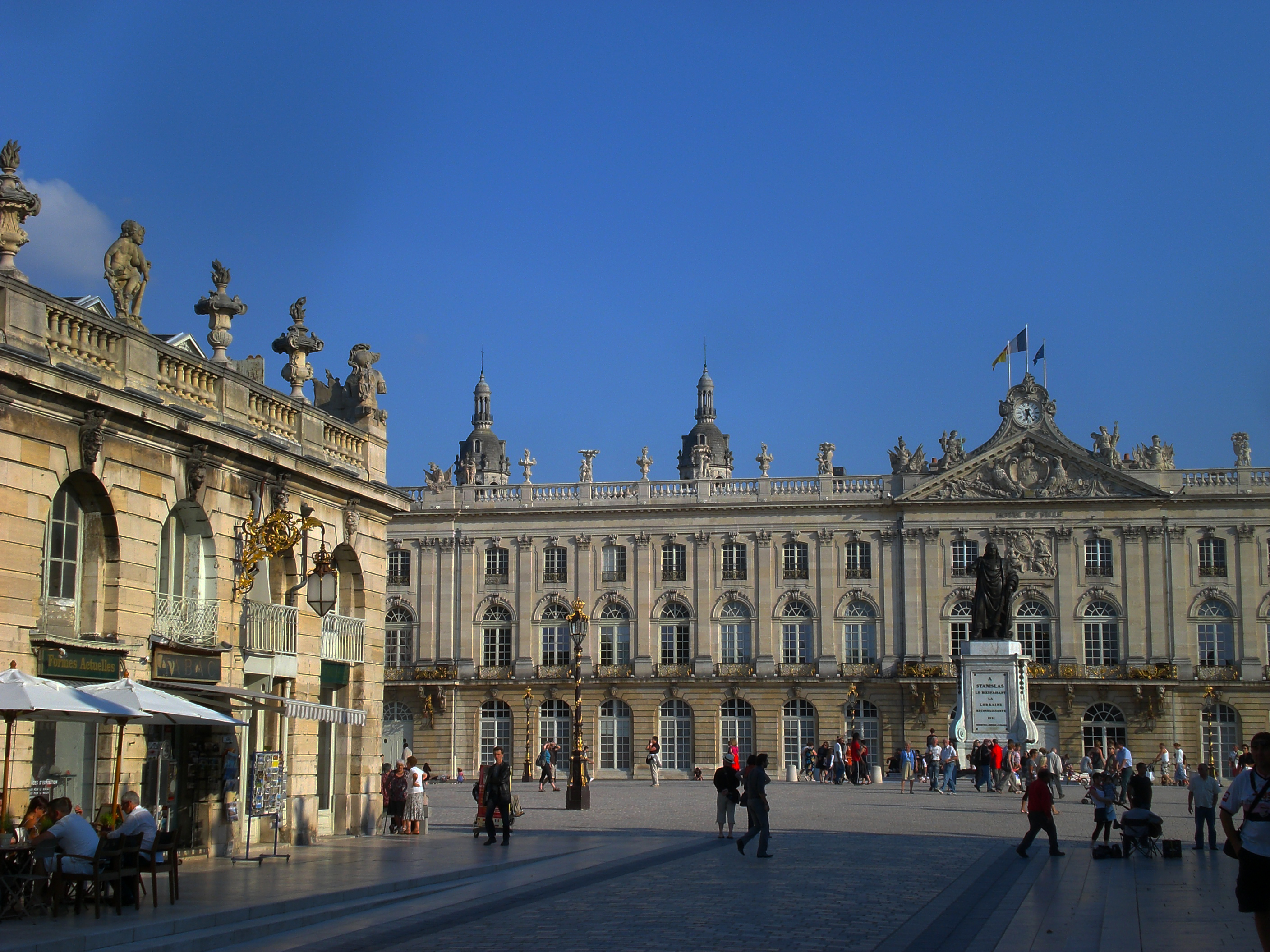
Nancy, Place Stanislas (1752–1760)

== See also ==
- Louis XIV style
- Louis XV style
- Architecture of Paris
- French Baroque and Classicism

== Bibliography ==
- Ayers, Andrew (2004). The Architecture of Paris. Stuttgart, London: Edition Axel Menges. ISBN 9783930698967.
- Berger, Robert W. (1985). Versailles: The Château of Louis XIV. University Park: The College Arts Association.
- Berger, Robert W. (1993). The Palace of the Sun: The Louvre of Louis XIV. University Park: The Pennsylvania State University Press. ISBN 9780271008479.
- Cabanne, Perre (1988), L'Art Classique et le Baroque, Paris: Larousse, ISBN 978-2-03-583324-2
- Ducher, Robert (1988). Caractéristique des styles. Paris: Flammarion. ISBN 2-08-011539-1.
- Curl, James (2017). The Oxford Dictionary of Architecture, third edition. Oxford, United Kingdom: Oxford University Press. ISBN 978-019-967498-5
- Hanser, David A. (2006). Architecture of France. Westport, Connecticut: Greenwood Press. ISBN 978-0-313-31902-0.
- Hopkins, Owen (2014). Les styles en architecture. Dunod. ISBN 978-2-10-070689-1.
- Lemerle, Frédérique & Yves Pauwels (2008). "Baroque Architecture", Flammarion, 2008.
- Millon, Henry A., ed. (1999). The Triumph of the Baroque: Architecture in Europe, 1600–1750. New York: Rizzoli.
- Neuman, Robert (2013). Baroque and Rococo Art and Architecture. Upper Saddle River: Pearson. ISBN 978-0-205-83226-2.
- Prina, Francesca; Demartini, Elena (2006). Petite encylopédie de l'architecture. Paris: Solar. ISBN 2-263-04096-X.
- Summerson, John (1963). The Classical Language of Architecture. Cambridge, Massachusetts: The MIT Press. ISBN 9780262690126.
- Texier, Simon (2012). Paris- Panorama de l'architecture. Parigramme. ISBN 978-2-84096-667-8.
