= Philibert Le Roy =

17th-century French architect and military engineer

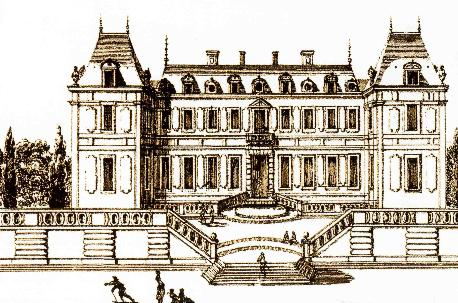
The garden facade of Le Roy's new chateau at Versailles, after an engraving by Israel Silvestre

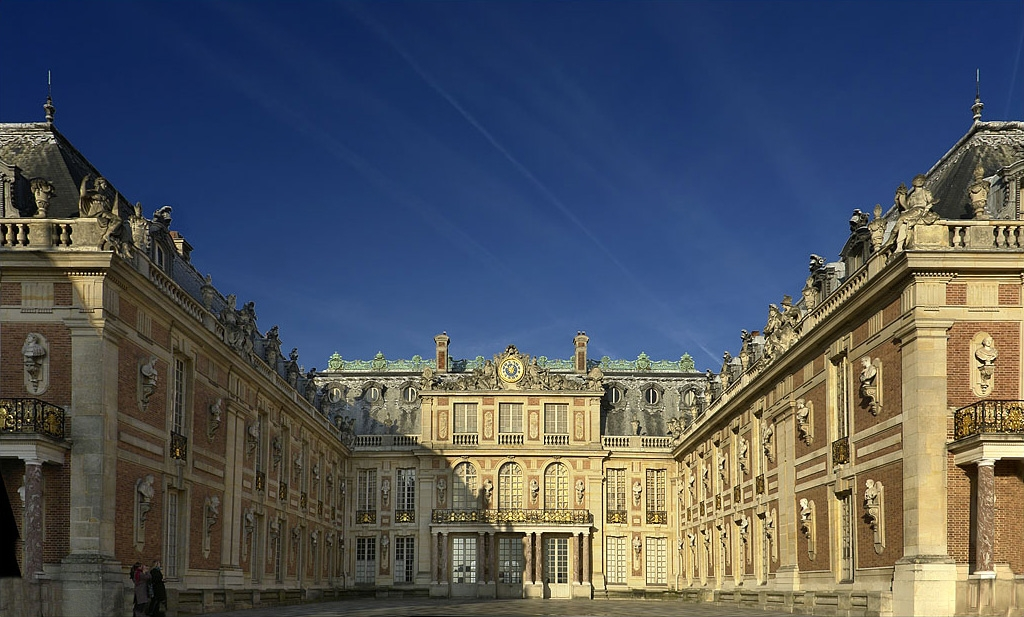
The Cour de Marbre at Versailles, beneath the rich ornamentation is the three-winged chateau of Philibert Le Roy

Philibert Le Roy (French pronunciation: [filibɛʁ lə ʁwa]; died 1646) was a 17th-century French architect and military engineer who worked in the Baroque and classical styles. Today, he is chiefly remembered for his appointment as "royal engineer and architect" to King Louis XIII.

== Works ==
Historical records show that in 1625 Le Roy was employed by the King's brother, Gaston, duc d'Orléans. By 1627 he had become a royal architect and was involved in some minor projects on behalf of the king. These included the construction of a tennis court at the King's hunting lodge at Versailles, then a village a few kilometres from Paris. It can be assumed that he replaced Nicolas Huau, the previous court architect who died in 1626. From 1631 he was employed in the creation of a small chateau replacing the existing hunting lodge. This phase of construction was completed in 1634.

It was this small chateau of three wings around an open court that would eventually become the core of the great chateau at Versailles built by Louis XIV. Le Roy's original chateau was of a simple construction. Its walls were of cream coloured stone which framed stuccoed panels painted to resemble bricks. The roof was of blue slate. The colours employed by the architect were no coincidence, but reflected the red, white and blue of the King's livery. In appearance, Le Roy's Chateau de Versailles is not dissimilar from Francois Mansard's designs for the Château de Maisons. A near contemporary of the Versailles chateau, the construction of Maisons is considered a defining moment in French architecture's movement towards the Baroque style.

Little more is known of Le Roy's personal life. He died in 1646.
