= Gaillot =

Gaillot (French: [ɡajo]) is a French surname. Notable people with the surname include:

- Albane Gaillot (born 1971), French politician
- Bernard Gaillot (1780–1847), French painter
- Jacques Gaillot (1935–2023), French Roman Catholic bishop and activist
- Jean Baptiste Aimable Gaillot (1834–1921), French astronomer
- Philippe Gaillot (footballer) (born 1965), French footballer
