= Bernard Gaillot =

French painter

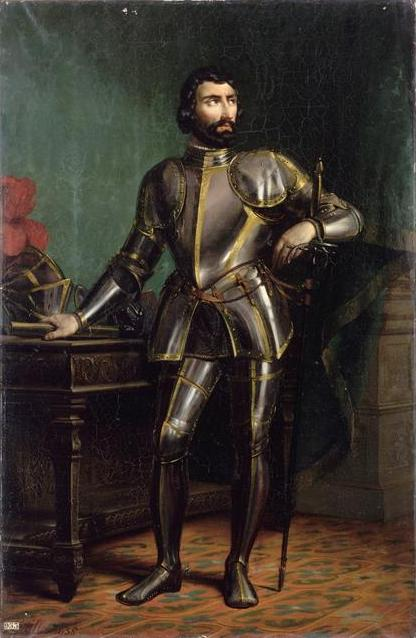
Charles III, Duke of Bourbon, portrait from 1835

Bernard Gaillot (French: [bɛʁnaʁ ɡajo]), a French historical painter, born at Versailles in 1780, was a pupil of Jacques-Louis David.

He died in Paris in 1847.

== Works ==
His principal works are:

- Cornelia, 1817.
- St. Martin (Val-de-Grâce, Paris).
- Conversion of St. Augustine, 1819 (Notre-Dame-des-Victoires, Paris).
- Dream of St. Monica, 1822 (Notre-Dame-des-Victoires, Paris).
- St. Louis visiting the Holy Sepulchre (Sacristy of St. Denis).
- St. Louis bearing the Crown of Thorns, 1824 (Palais synodal, Sens).
- Holy Angels, 1824 (Chapel in Lille).
- Dream of St. Joseph, 1824 (Saint-Vincent-de-Paul, Paris).
- The Assumption, 1827 (Eu).
- Christ blessing little Children, 1831.
