= Val-de-Grâce (church) =

Coordinates: 48°50′27″N 02°20′31″E

- Église Notre-Dame du Val-de-Grâce
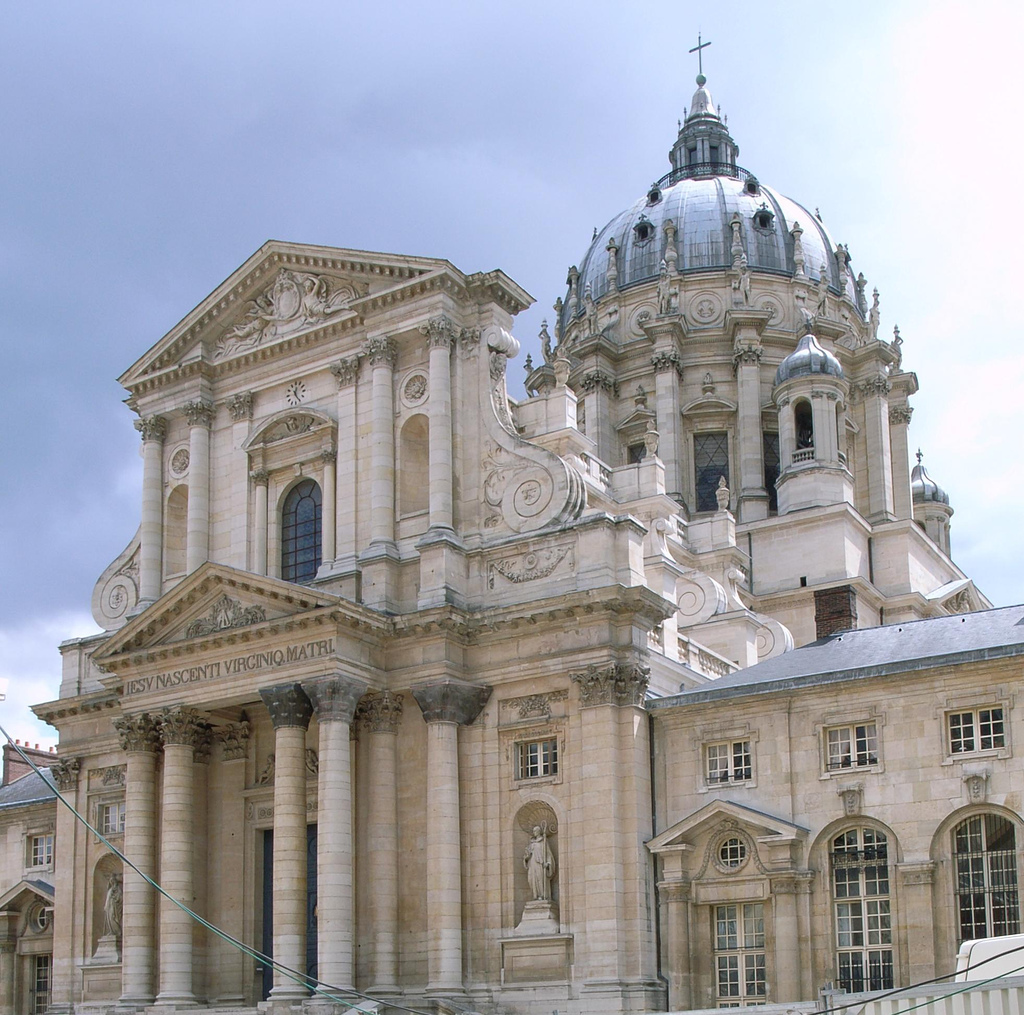
- The west front of the church
- Val-de-Grâce (church)
- Location: 1 Place Alphonse Laveran, 5th arrondissement, Paris
- Country: France
- Denomination: Roman Catholic
- Website: www.valdegrace.org

Architecture
- Heritage designation: Monument historique
- Style: Baroque
- Groundbreaking: 1634
- Completed: 1667

Administration
- Archdiocese: Paris

The Church of the Val-de-Grâce (French pronunciation: [val də ɡʁɑs]) is a Roman Catholic church in the 5th arrondissement of Paris. The church was built as part of a royal abbey by Anne of Austria, the Queen of France, to celebrate the birth of her son, Louis XIV in 1638. Construction began in 1645 under the direction of architect François Mansart and was completed in 1665 by Gabriel Le Duc. The abbey and church were turned into a hospital during the French Revolution and then became part of the Val-de-Grâce Hospital, which closed in 1979. The church is attached to the diocese of the French military and is open to visitors at specified hours. Its dome is a landmark in the skyline of Paris.

== History ==
The site of the church, to the south of the center of Paris, was a royal property since the 13th century. At the beginning of the 16th century, it was purchased by the Connetable of Bourbon, who built a small chateau there, which took the name Hotel de Petit-Bourbon. In 1621 Queen Anne of Austria, nineteen years old, who had been married to King Louis XIII at age 13, purchased the estate and the chateau, with the intention of finding a sanctuary away from the noise and intrigues of the royal residence in the Louvre Palace. She transformed the Petit-Bourbon into a convent for a community of Benedictine sisters from the Abbey of Val-Profonde, and in 1634 she began construction of a much larger new church and abbey on the site given by the crown.

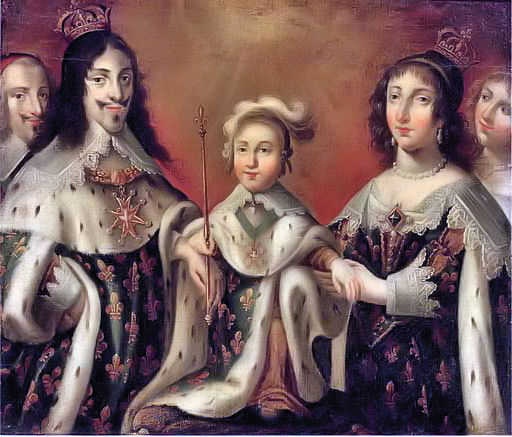
Louis XIII, Anne of Austria, and their son Louis XIV

The project advanced slowly, because Anne had fallen from the favour of King Louis XIII, largely because she had not given him an heir. She maintained a secret correspondence with her family in Spain, and with the royal court of England and the House of Lorraine. She and her intrigues were soon discovered by the prime minister, Cardinal Richelieu. Her correspondence was monitored, and the King for a time forbade Anne to visit the abbey, But in 1638, Anne, at the age of thirty-seven, after twenty-two years of marriage, became pregnant with Louis' heir, the future Louis XIV, and with his birth everything changed for the Queen.

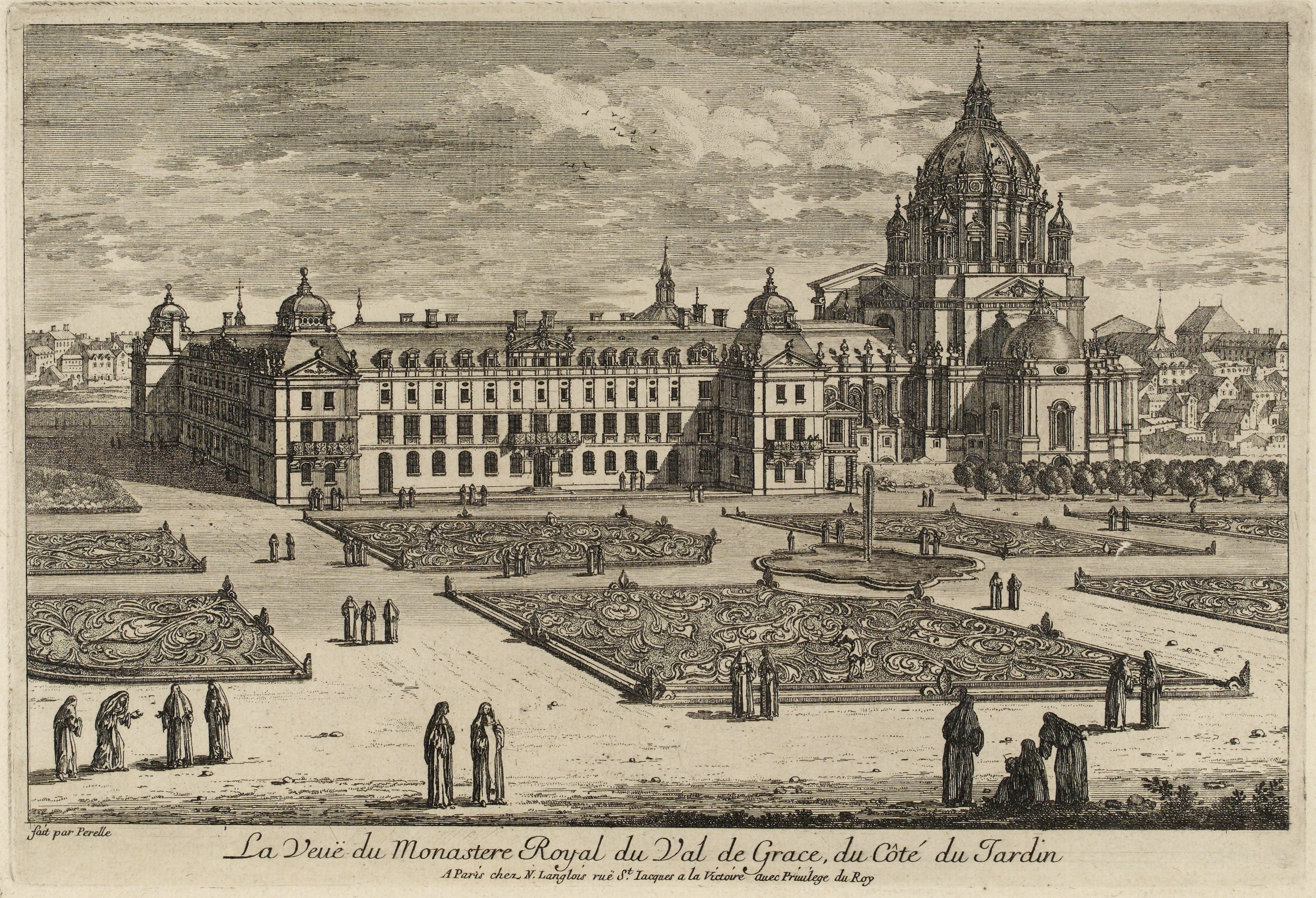
The monastery and church in the 1660s

Cardinal Richelieu died in 1642, and Louis XIII died a few months later. in 1643, Anne became Queen-Regent to her four-year-old son, now Louis XIV. In gratitude for his birth, Anne pressed forward with the construction of an entirely rebuilt church and monastery, "to spare no expense and to leave an eternal mark of her piety." The first stone was laid in 1645 by the child Louis XIV. Anne engaged François Mansart as the project's architect, but Mansart departed after only a year in disagreement over the scope and cost of the project. Mansard's place was taken first by Jacques Lemercier, then Pierre Le Muet. The church was finished in 1665 by Gabriel Le Duc. Le Duc was responsible for building the dome and cupola, the adjacent buildings, and the baldachin inside.

After the birth of her first grandchild, Anne retired to the convent of Val-de-Grâce, where she died five years later in 1666.

During the French Revolution in 1793 the Benedictines were expelled from the abbey, and the National Convention ordered the conversion of the abbey into a military hospital. The royal symbols were effaced, but the abbey was spared the fate of several nearby convents, such as those of the Ursulines and the Feuillantines, which were demolished. When the abbey was disestablished in 1790, its furniture was removed along with the organ. The baldachino was preserved, but the high altar was moved to the care of the Petis-Augustins, and the small figures of the baldachino's nativity crèche were installed at the Church of Saint-Roch.

The church was restored in 1818-19 and in 1827. Control of the church was returned to the Catholic Diocese. The high altar was rebuilt at the order of Napoleon III by Victor Ruprich-Robert. The priest at Saint-Roch declined to return the original Anguier crèche, so a duplicate was created, using three sculptors: Clement Denis sculpted the infant Jesus, Justin-Marie the Virgin, and Joseph was sculpted by Louis Desprez.

== Exterior ==
The design of the church was inspired by two Roman churches, Saint Peter's Basilica and the Church of the Gesù (1584).The plan of the church is a Latin cross crowned by a dome. The church is attached to the other buildings of the old abbey, but is distinguished from them by the height of the facade and its imposing dome. The two-story facade, with its double stages of twin columns supporting a pediment and flanking consoles, recalls church elevations from the first part of the 17th century, such as the Church of the Feuillants, also designed by Mansart in 1623-24. More clear and sober than the Mannerists, Mansart's facade squares his façade with linked vertical lines using the columns and entablatures.

The facade of the new church also took inspiration from the "Jesuit style" or Baroque architecture, from the Church of the Gesù in Rome (1584). That church inspired Saint-Paul-Saint-Louis (1627-1641), the first church in Paris to break away from the Gothic style.

The portico of the church is supported by Corinthian columns, and the pediment of the church is decorated with the monograms AL (Anne of Austria and Louis XIII) and the Royal coat of arms. The architrave carries the inscription "Jesu. Nascenti, Virginique Matri" ("To Jesus new-born, and the Virgin Mother"), a reminder that the birth of Christ was long awaited, like the birth of Louis XIV. The upper level is supported by curving buttresses of stone and classical Corinthian columns.

The semi-circular place in front of the church was inspired by the first plan of Mansard for the church, which featured an obelisk. Ornate iron grills separate the church and place from the street and end in stone pavilions, while two stone walls separate the courtyard from the other portions of the convent.

The convent was constructed with two wings. To the left of the church was a building containing the residence of the nuns, as well as apartments for women connected with the royal family; the three nieces of Cardinal Mazarin; Queen Christine of Sweden; Henriette of France, Queen of England; the Queen of Poland, and others. It also included the very modest apartment of the Queen herself. The exterior is decorated with the initials AL, for Anne and Louis.

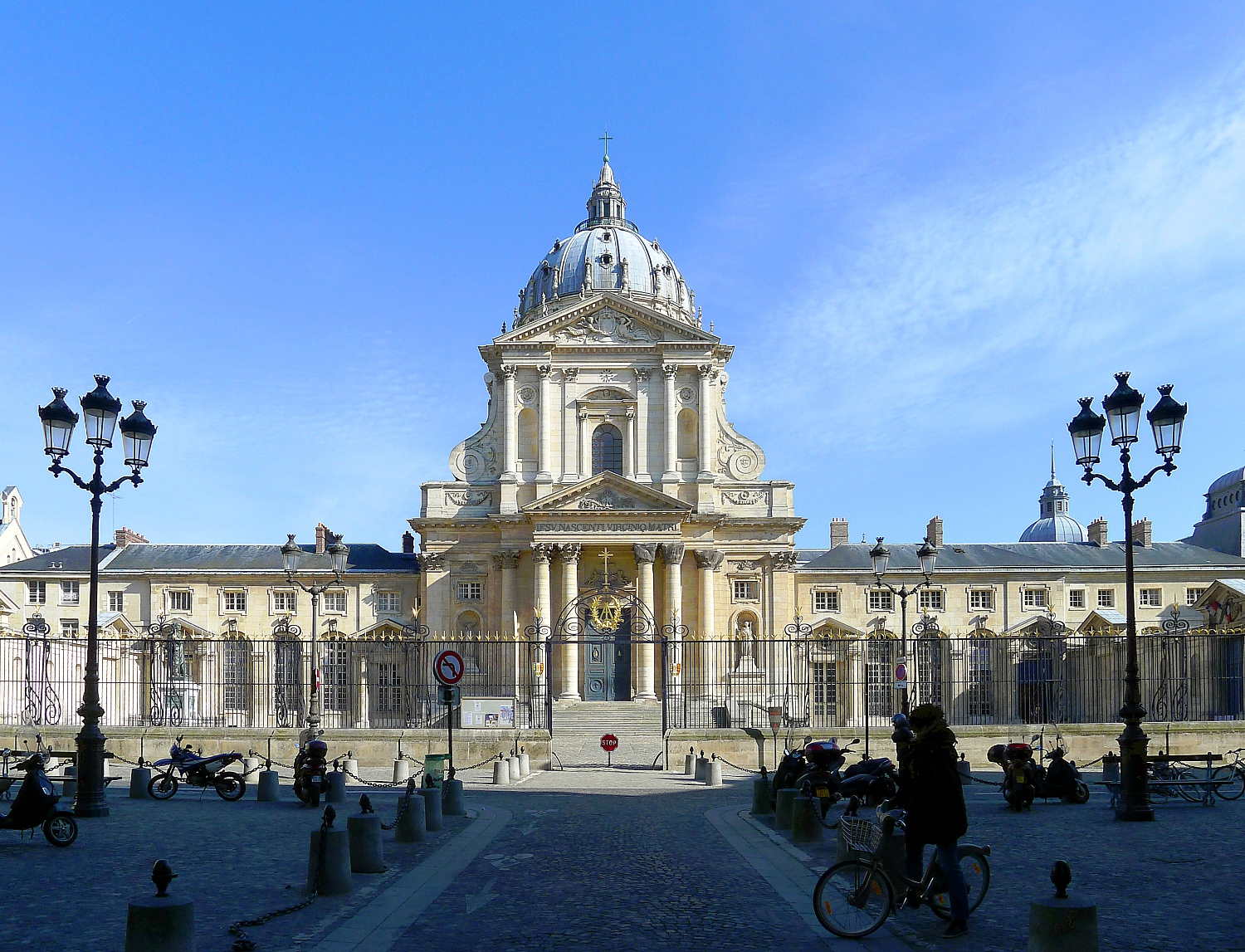
Facade and courtyard

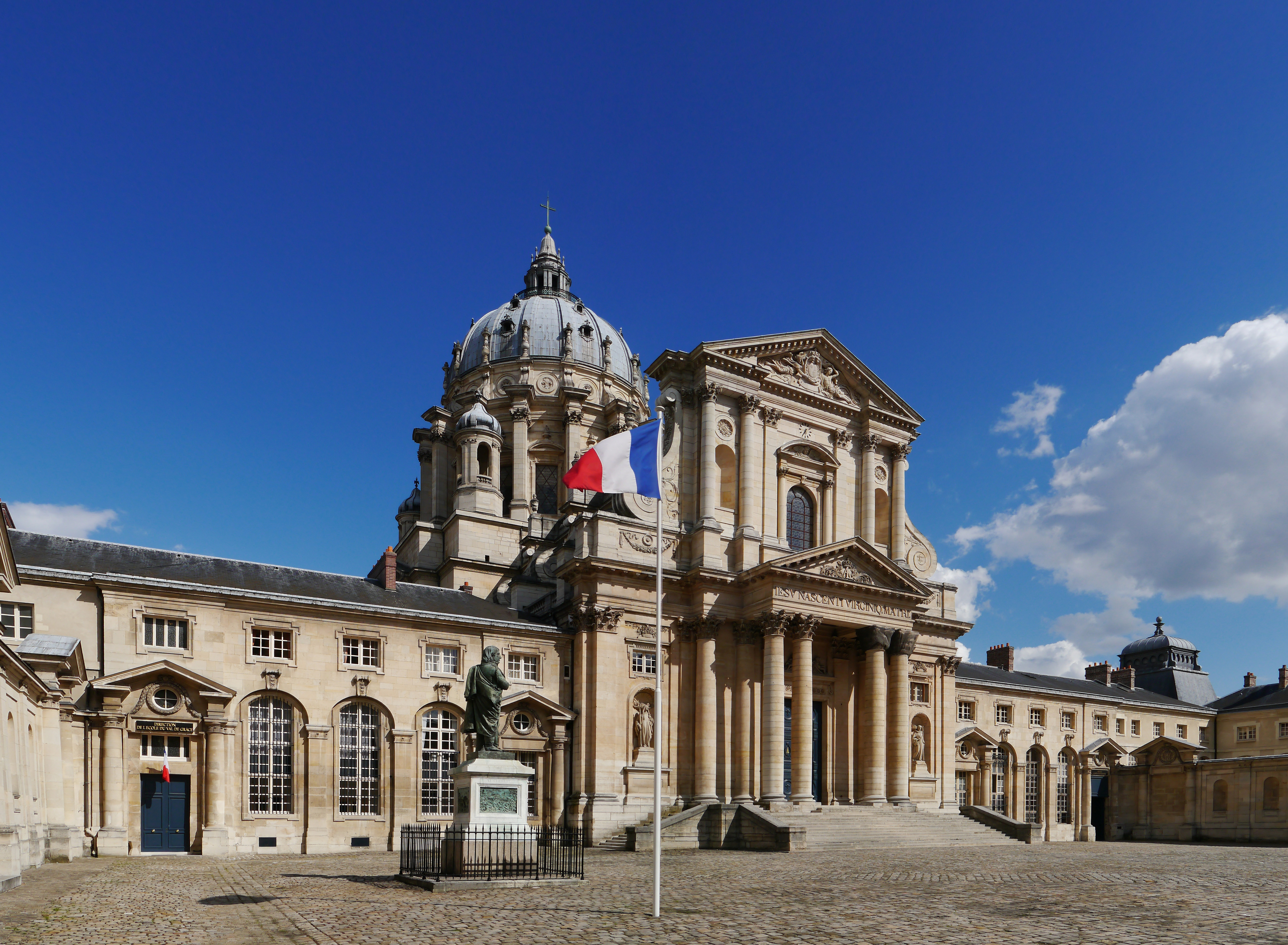
Facade and courtyard

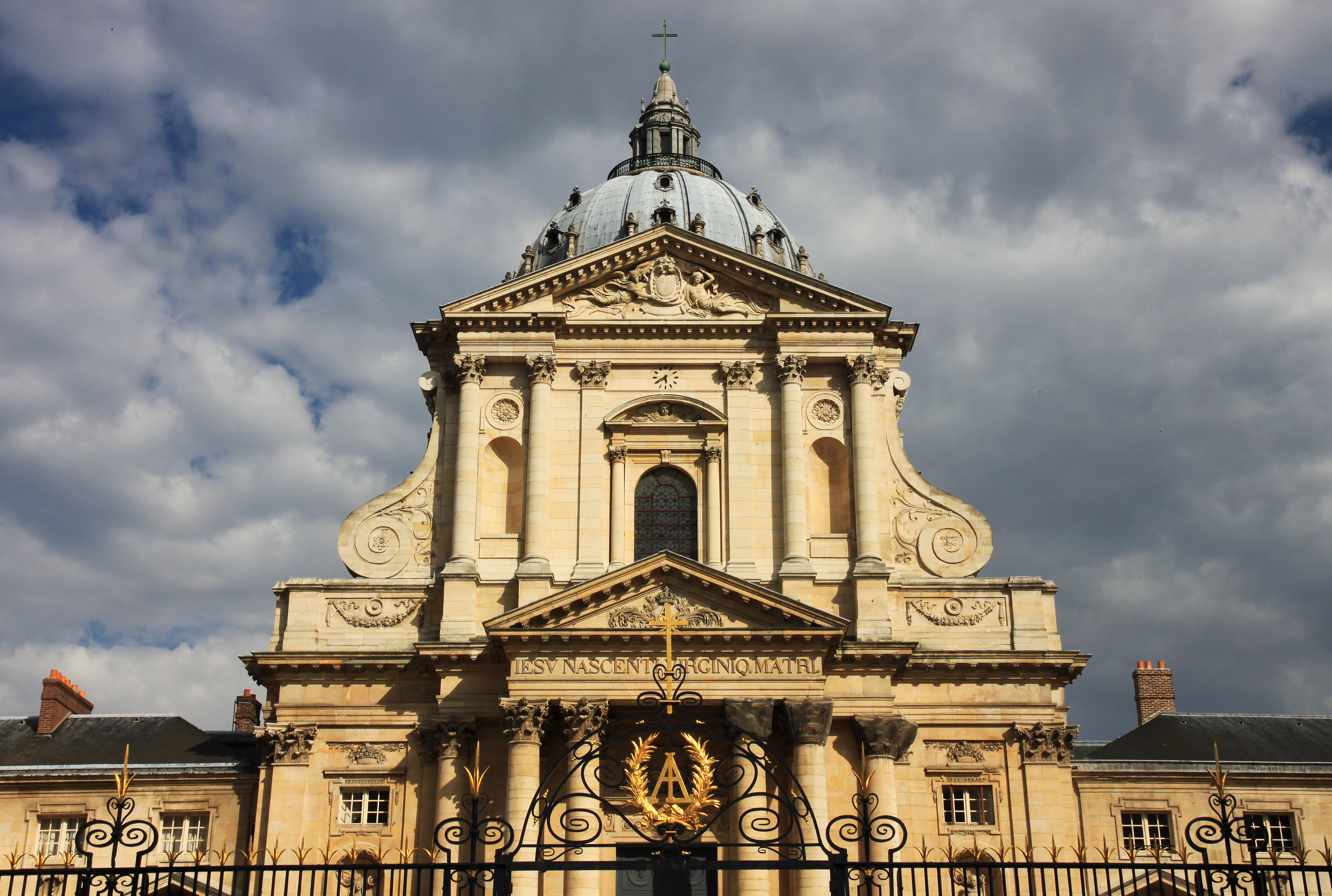
Upper Church facade

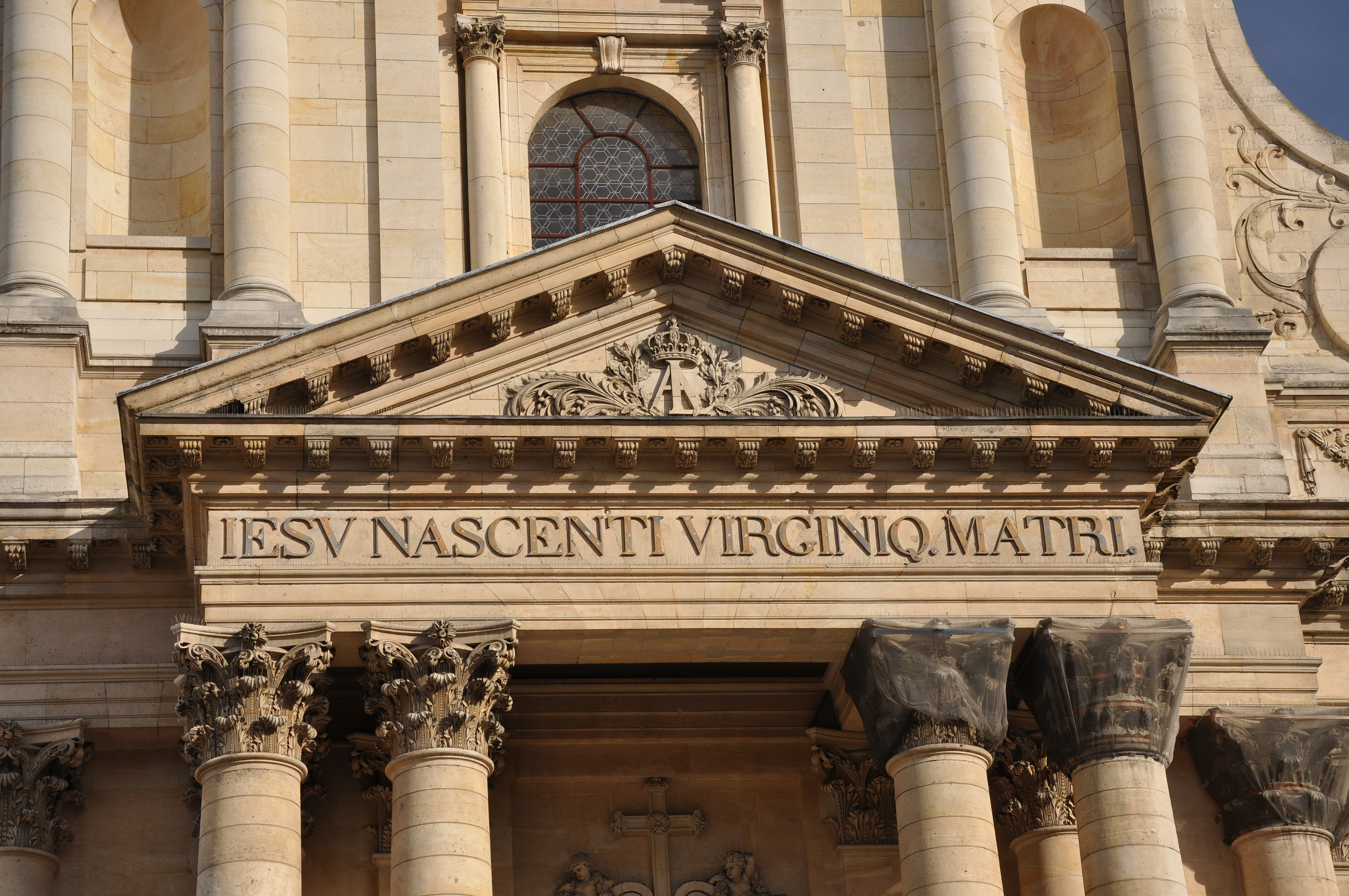
Portal, with the AL of Anne and Louis on the pediment

=== The Dome and Campanile ===
The dome was the work of the royal architect Jacques Lemercier, who took over the project after Mansart refused to carry out major modifications to his own design. Lemercier had designed the Pavillon de l'Horloge at the Louvre Palace, as well as the residence of Cardinal Richelieu at the Palais Royal. He had also designed the Saint-Sacrament chapel's spiral-coffered dome after Philibert de L'Orme's chapel at the Château d'Anet.

The dome is forty meters high, and was the tallest dome in Paris when it was built, but was soon passed in height by the domes of the Pantheon (60 meters) and of Les Invalides (107 meters), which it inspired. It was modelled after the dome of Saint-Peter's Basilica in Rome and was covered with lead with decos, which contain decorative gilded bands. Above the dome is the campanile with a globe topped by a cross. At the corners of the dome's base sit four small lanterns which contain the church's bells. The sides of the dome are divided by contreforts, or buttresses, between which are the windows, which have alternating rounded and triangular frontons. The frontons are also abundantly decorated with sculptures, medallions, the royal fleur-de-lis, and the initials 'L' and 'A' for Louis and Anne.

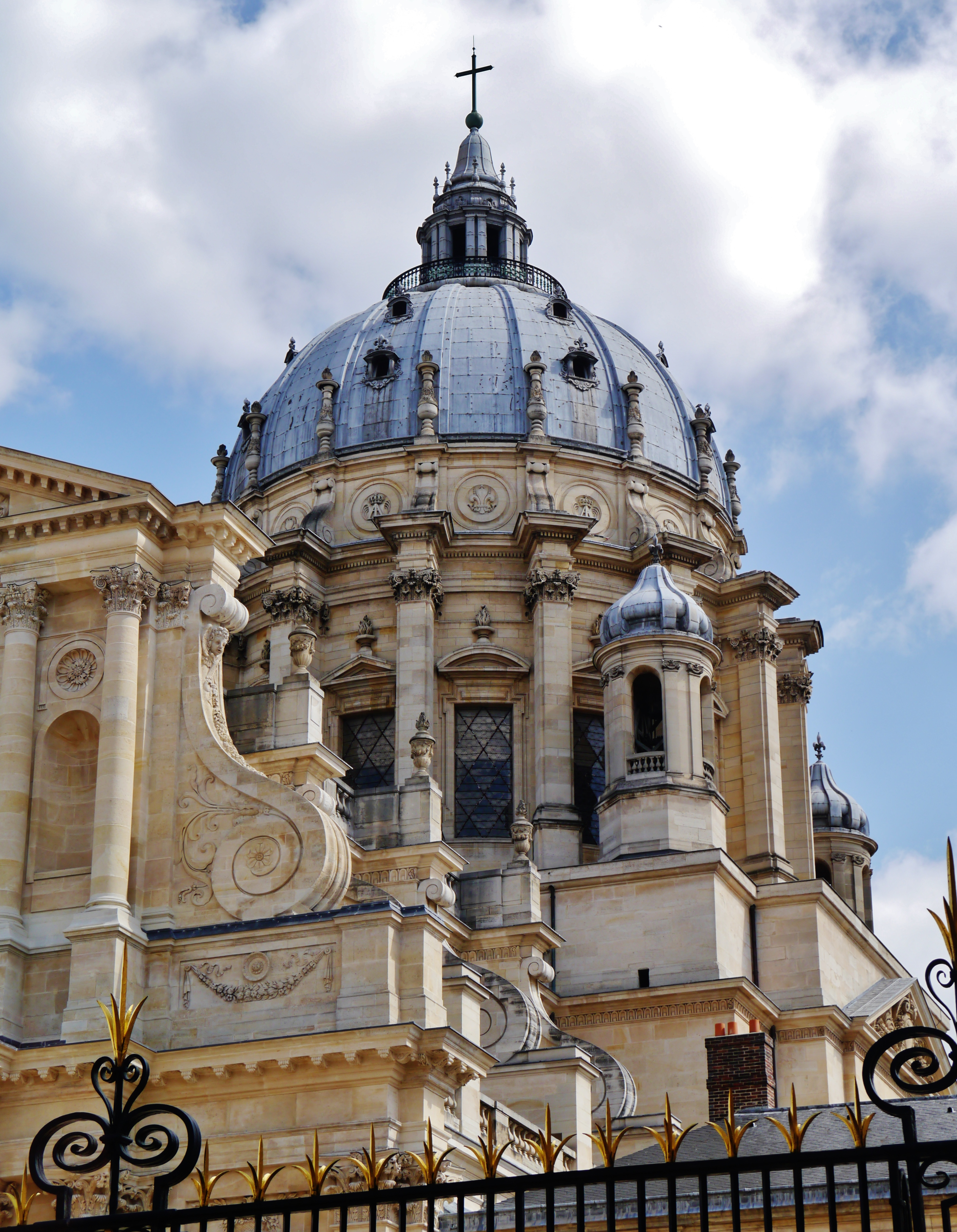
The dome

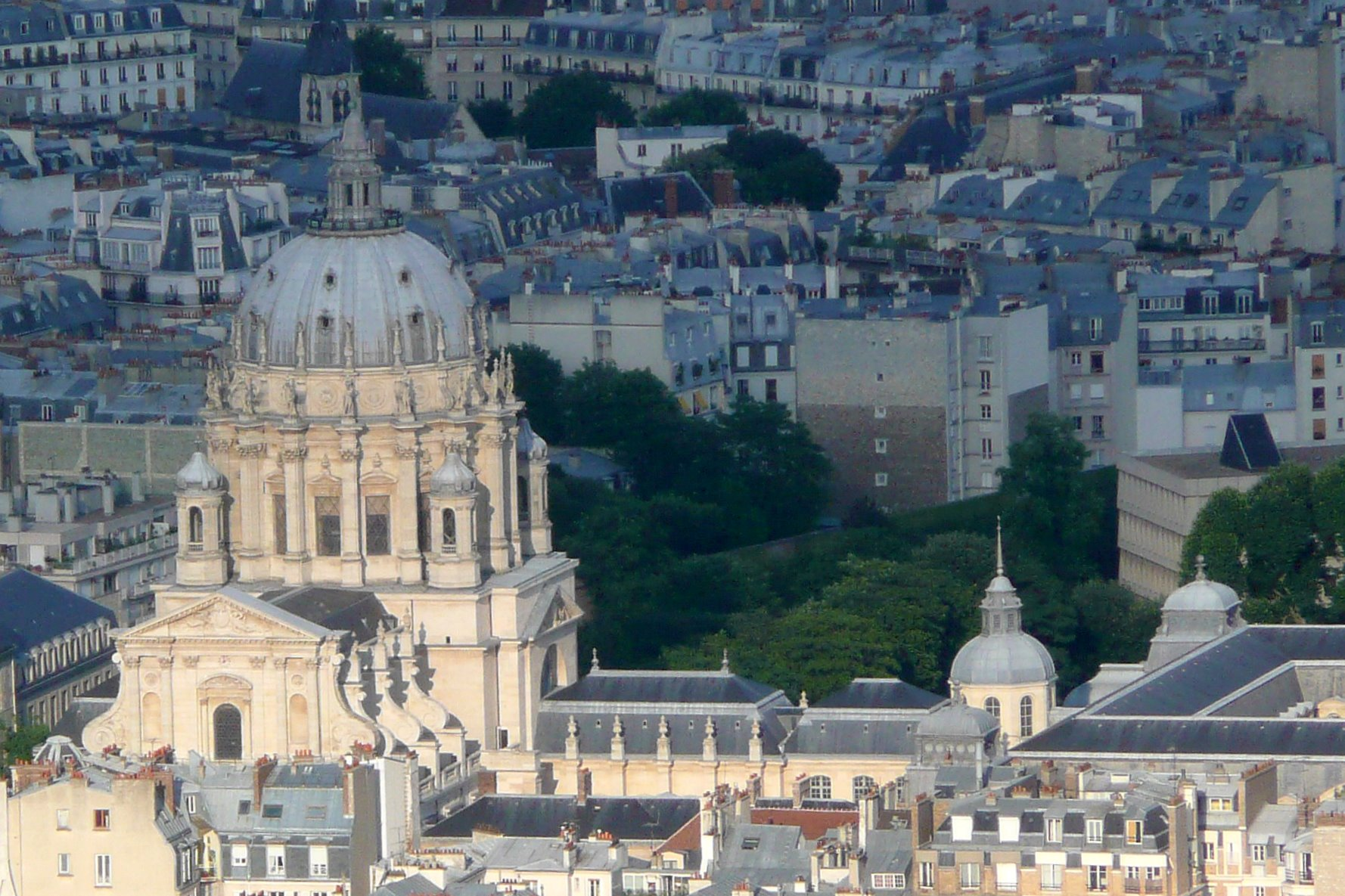
The dome seen from Montparnasse

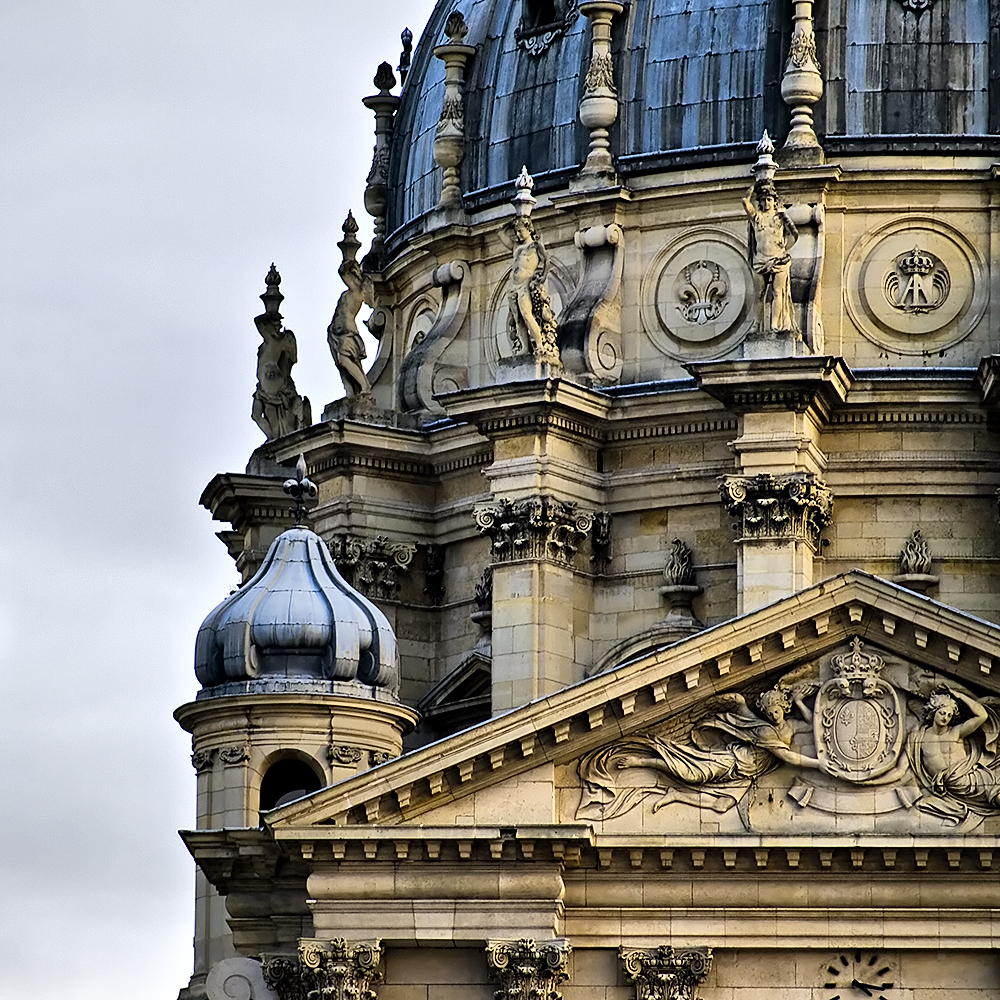
Detail of the dome

== Interior ==
The interior of the church is full of light, and decorated with a harmonious combination of French classicism and Italian Baroque elements. Its decoration was influenced by St. Peter's Basilica in Rome, particularly its baldaquin designed by Italian Baroque architect and sculptor Gian Lorenzo Bernini. Bernini visited Val-de-Grace and called it "The marvel of the Ile-de-France".

Rows of classical columns with Corinthian capitals form arcades with rounded arches on either side of the nave. The spandrels of the nave are highly decorated with allegorical sculptures by the brothers Francois Anguier (1604-1669) and Michel Anguier (1612-1686), and Philippe de Buyster (1595-1688). Those on the spandrels depicts the theological virtues, while the vaults display busts of Joseph and Mary and other saints.

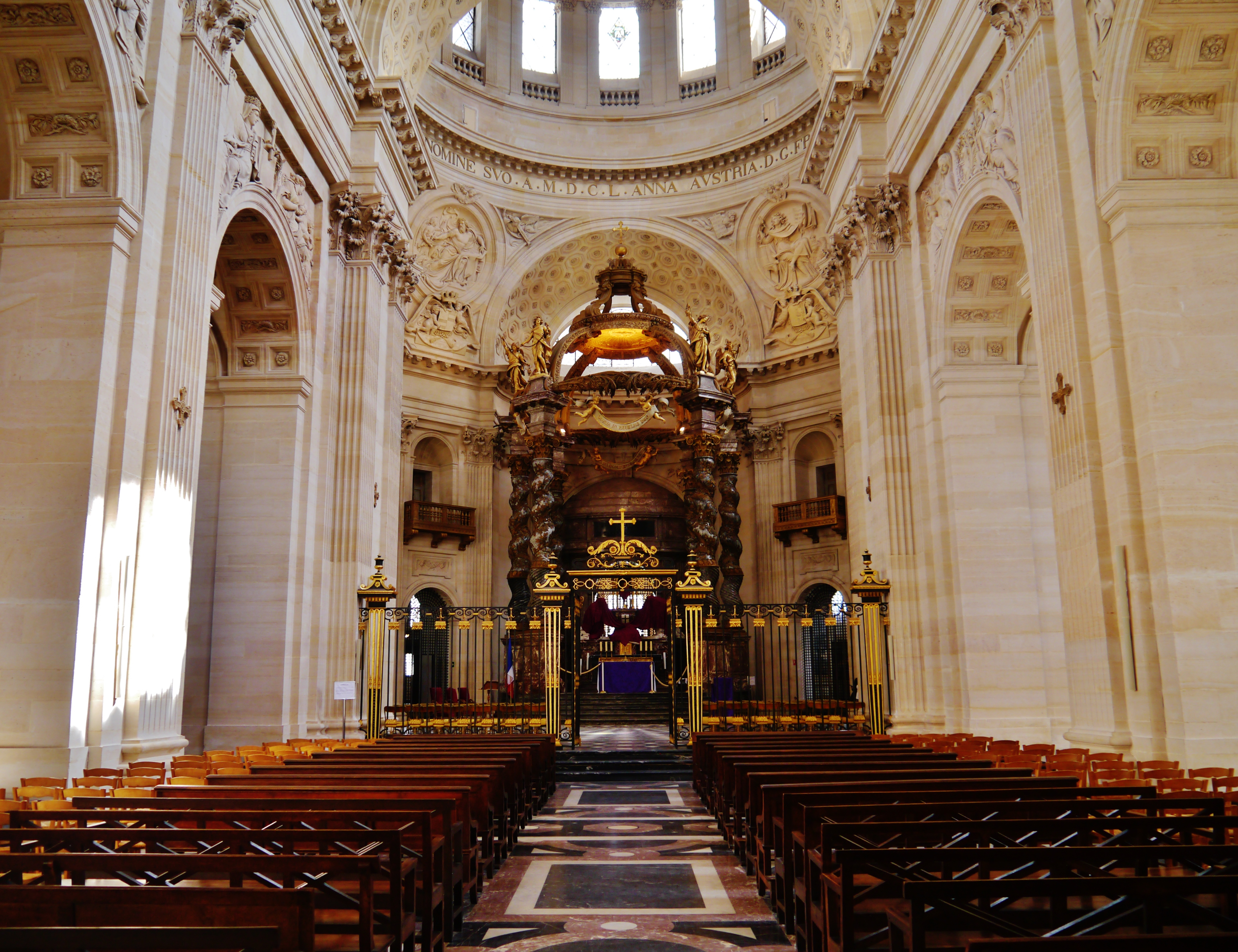
The nave looking east toward the choir

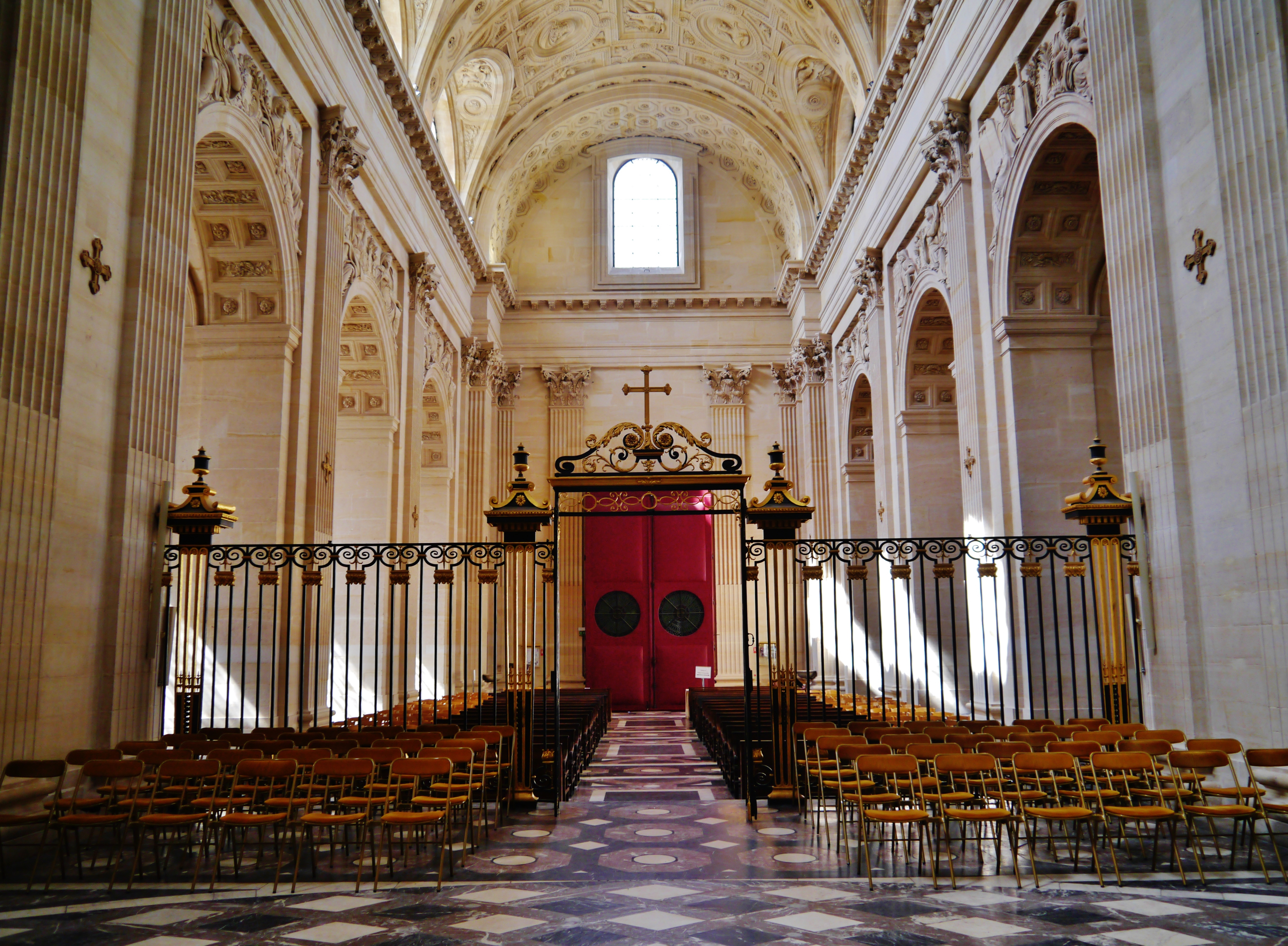
The nave looking west

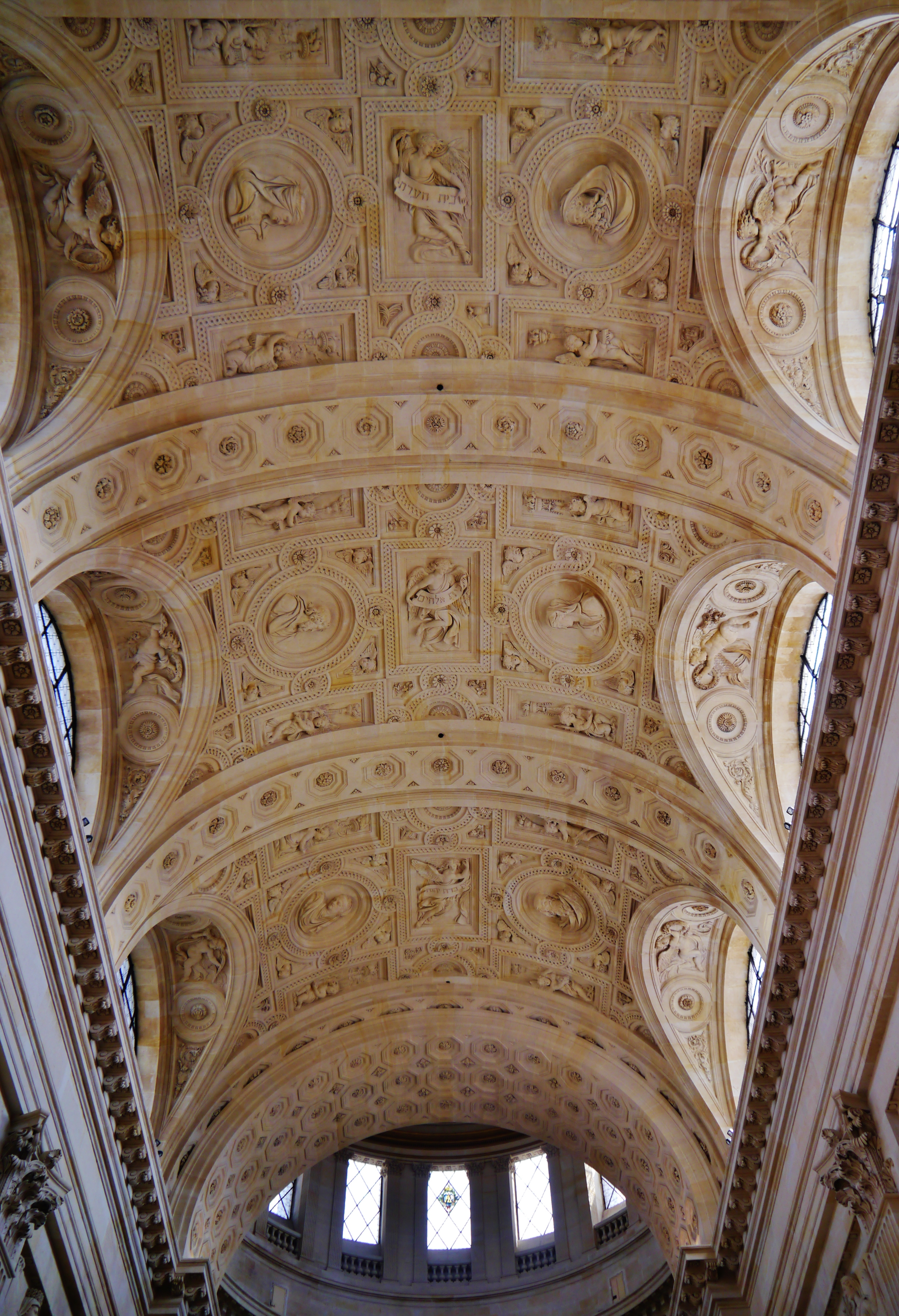
Decoration of the vaults of the choir

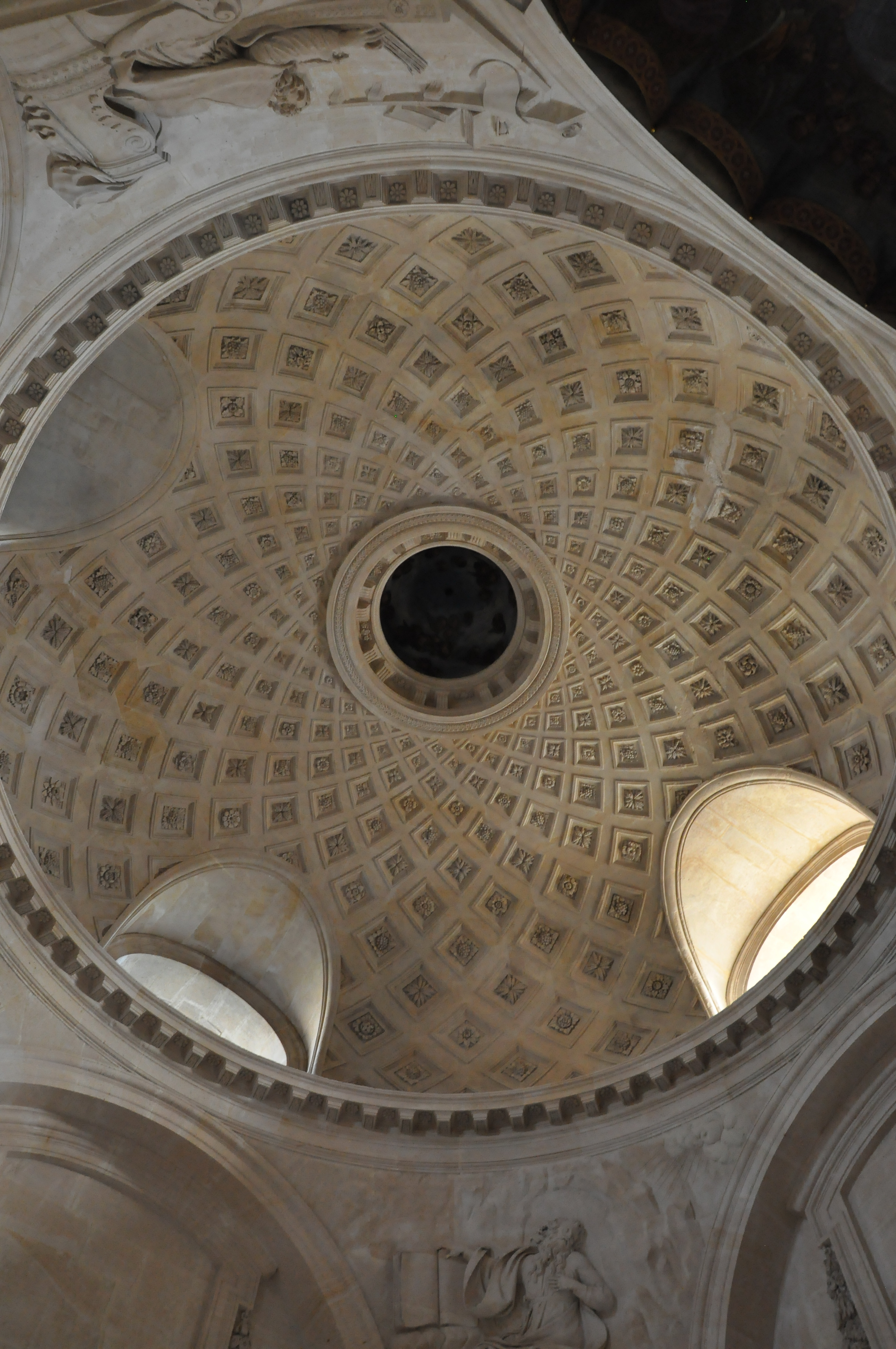
Interior of cupola of the Saint-Sacrament Chapel
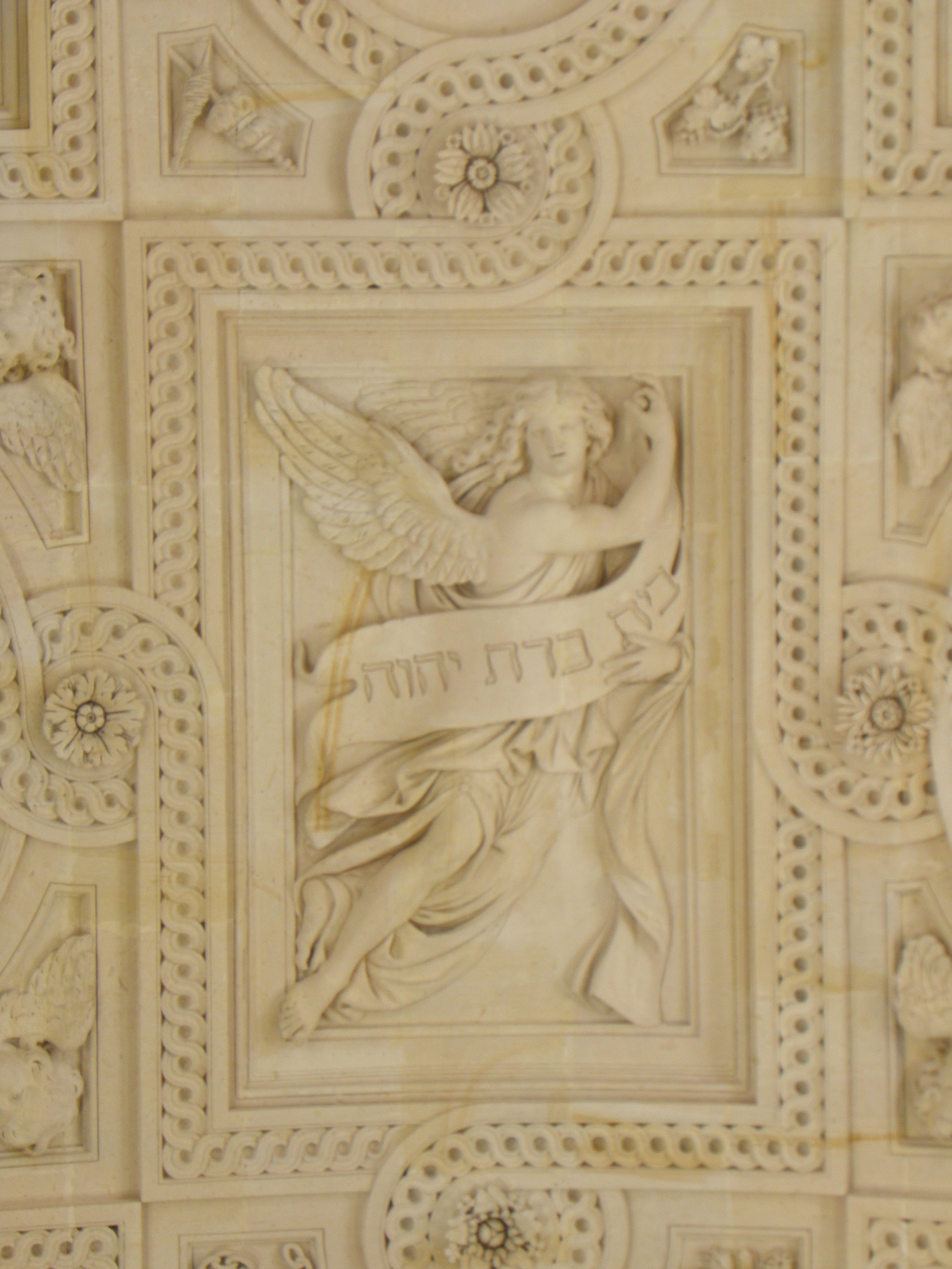
Detail of the nave vaults—Angel (north nave)

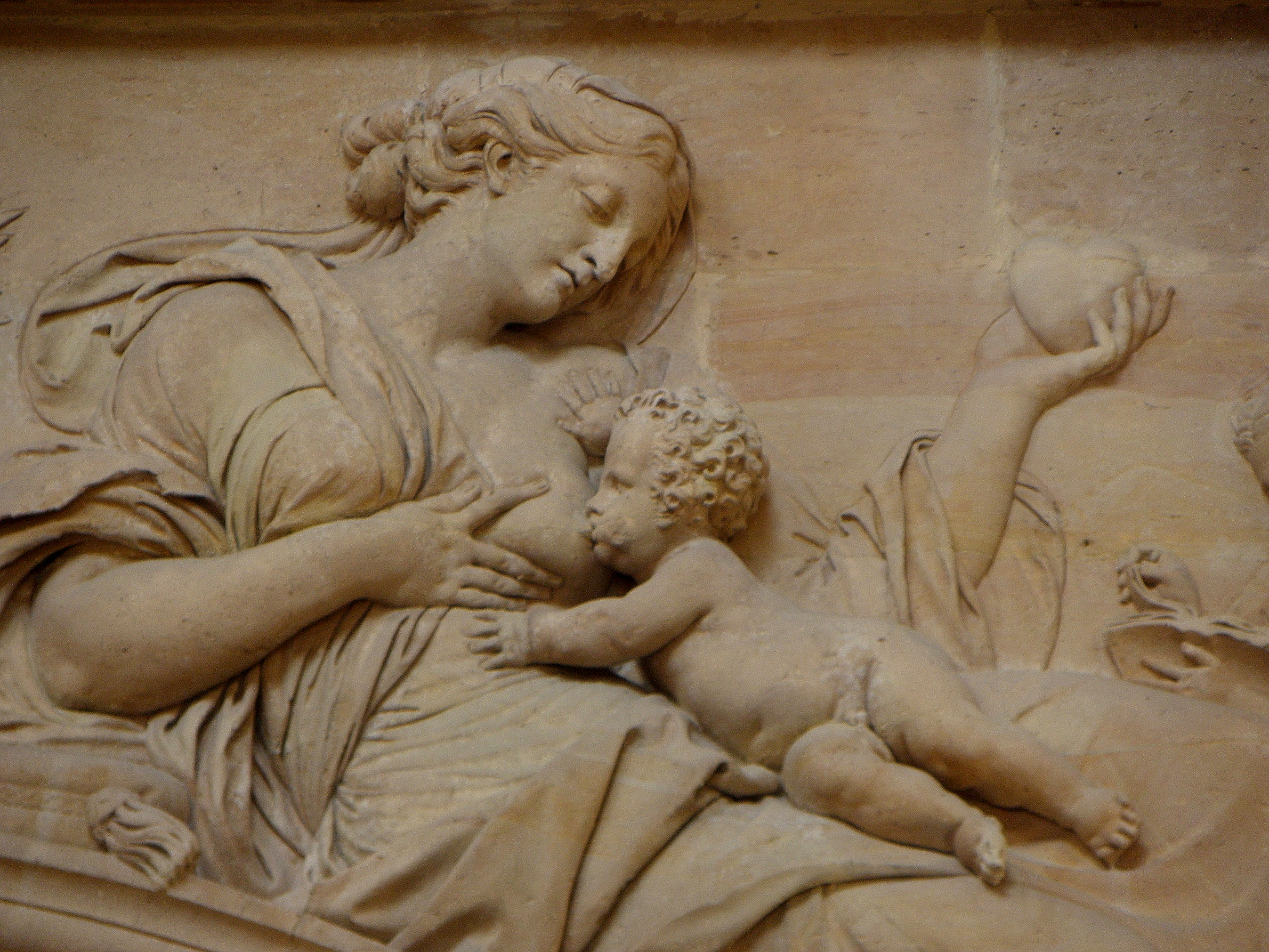
Theological virtues - charity- nave spandrel- north

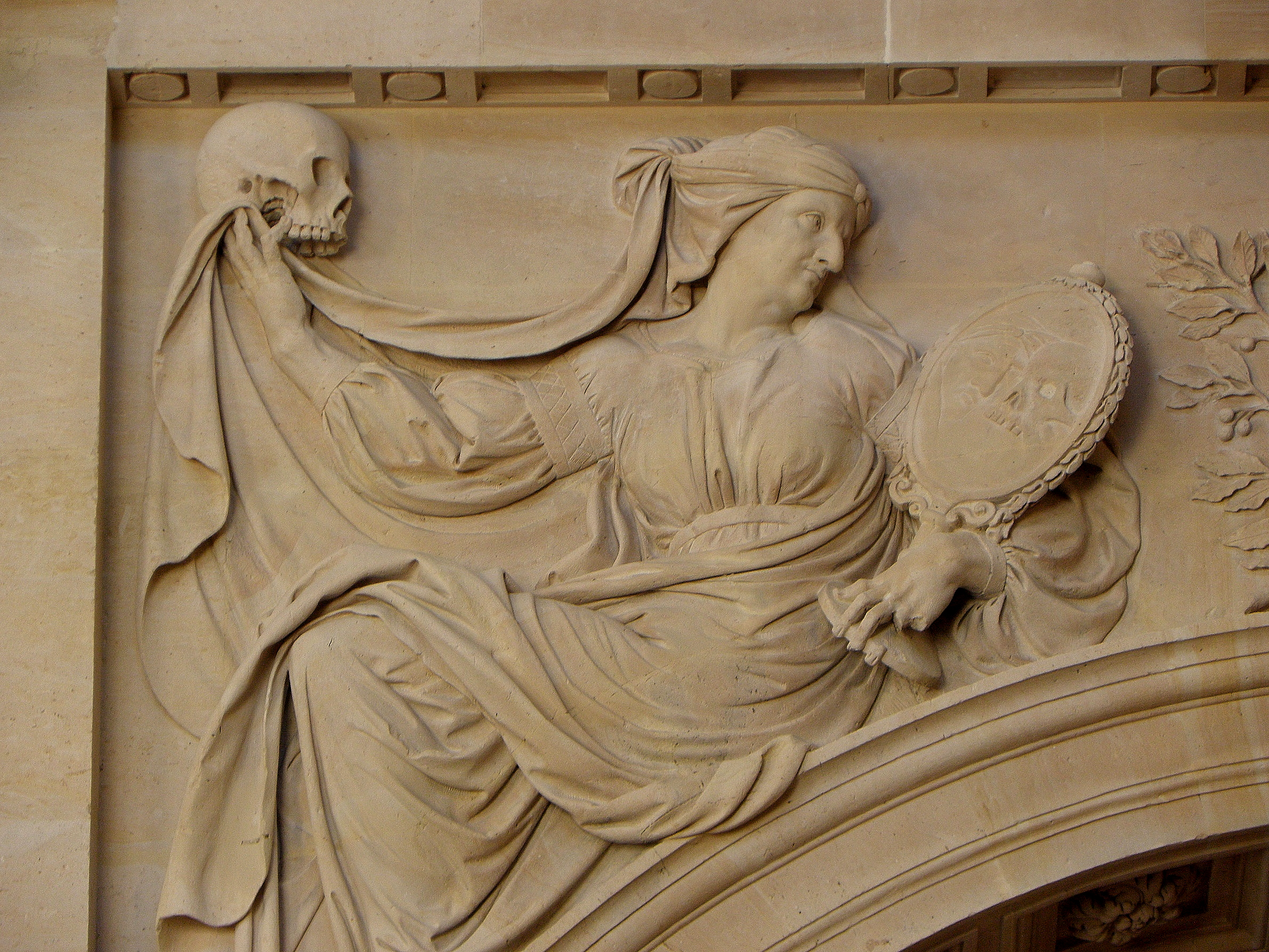
Nave spandrel - "Prudence"

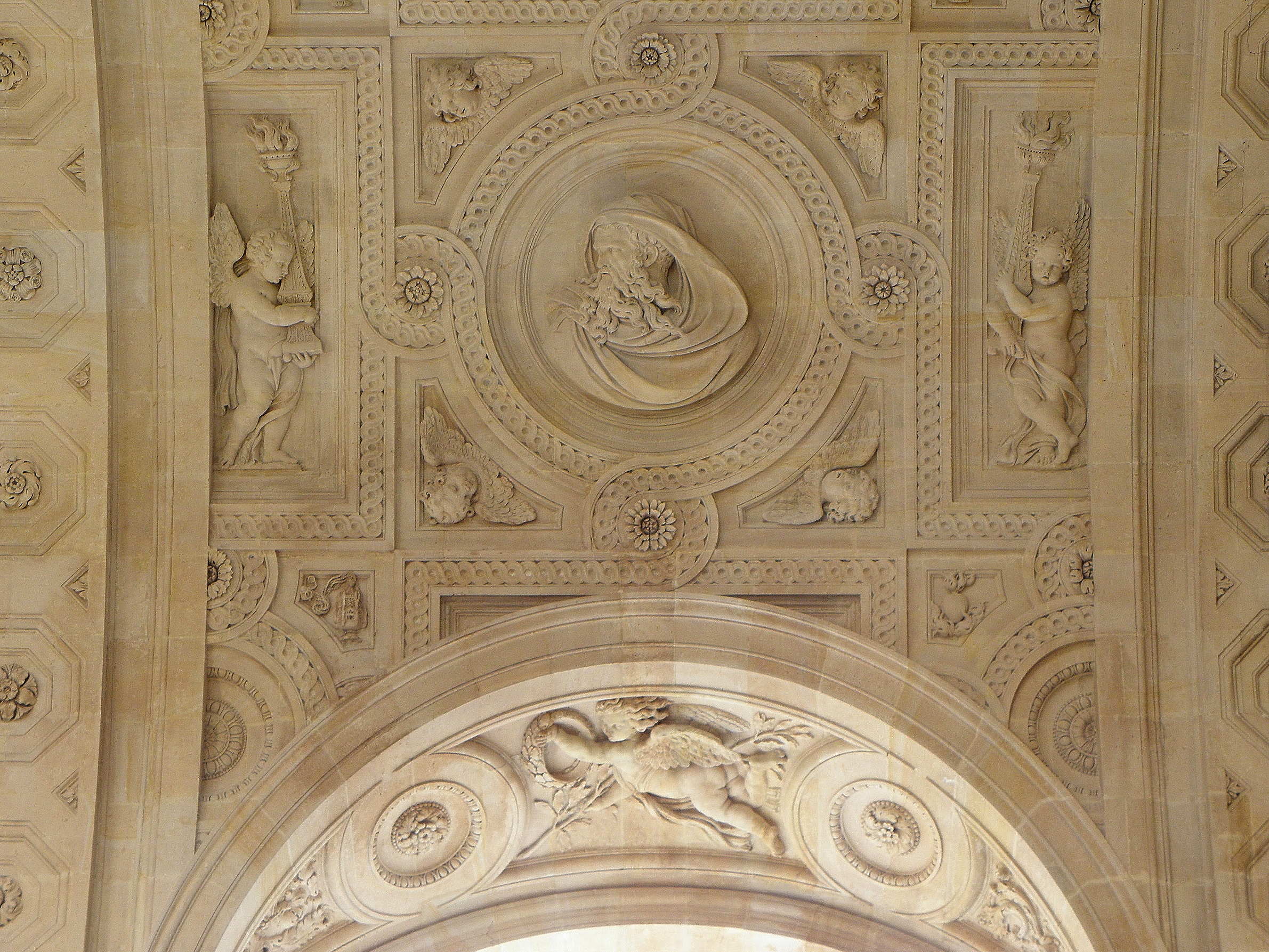
"Saint Zacharia" - nave spandrel

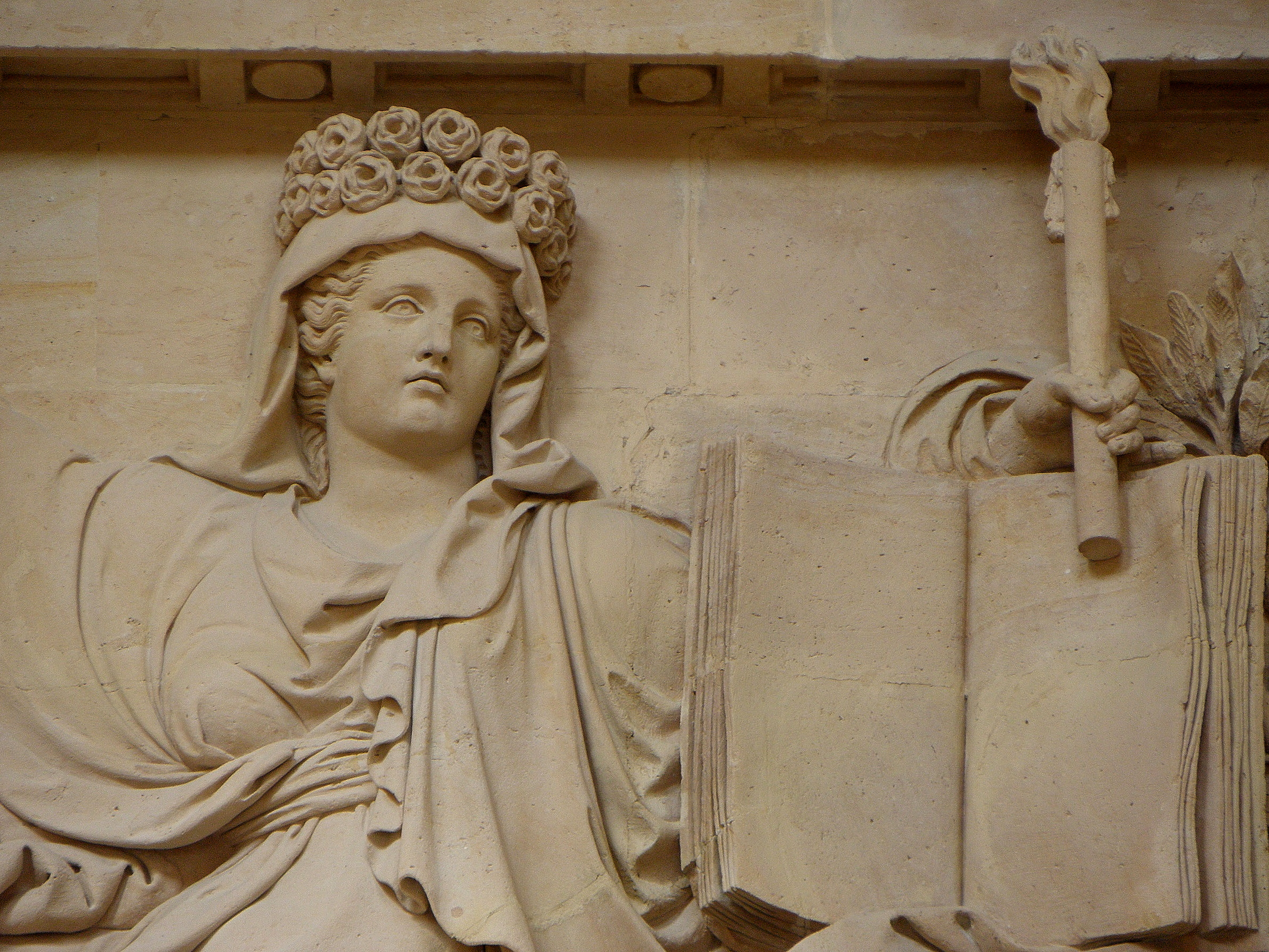
Theological virtues - "Faith" (Nave spandrel - North)

=== The Choir and baldaquin ===
The baldachin (canopy) over the main altar in the choir is one of the most distinctive features of the church. It was designed by the architect Gabriel Le Duc and modeled on that in Saint Peter's Basilica by Bernini. It consists of six twisting columns of black marble with white veins, decorated with gilding, and holding a group of carved and gilded angels made by the sculptor Michel Anguier (1612-1686). A copy of the Val-de-Grâce baldaquin is found in the Church of Saint-François de Sales in Neuville, Quebec.

Below the baldaquin is another sculptural ensemble, "The Nativity", three sculptures depicting the birth of Christ, with figures of Joseph and the Virgin Mary with the Christ child. The original of this work wa made by Michel Anguier in the 17th century to celebrate the birth of Louis XIV and is now in the church of Saint-Roch, Paris. The work in Val-de-Grace is a copy made in 1869.

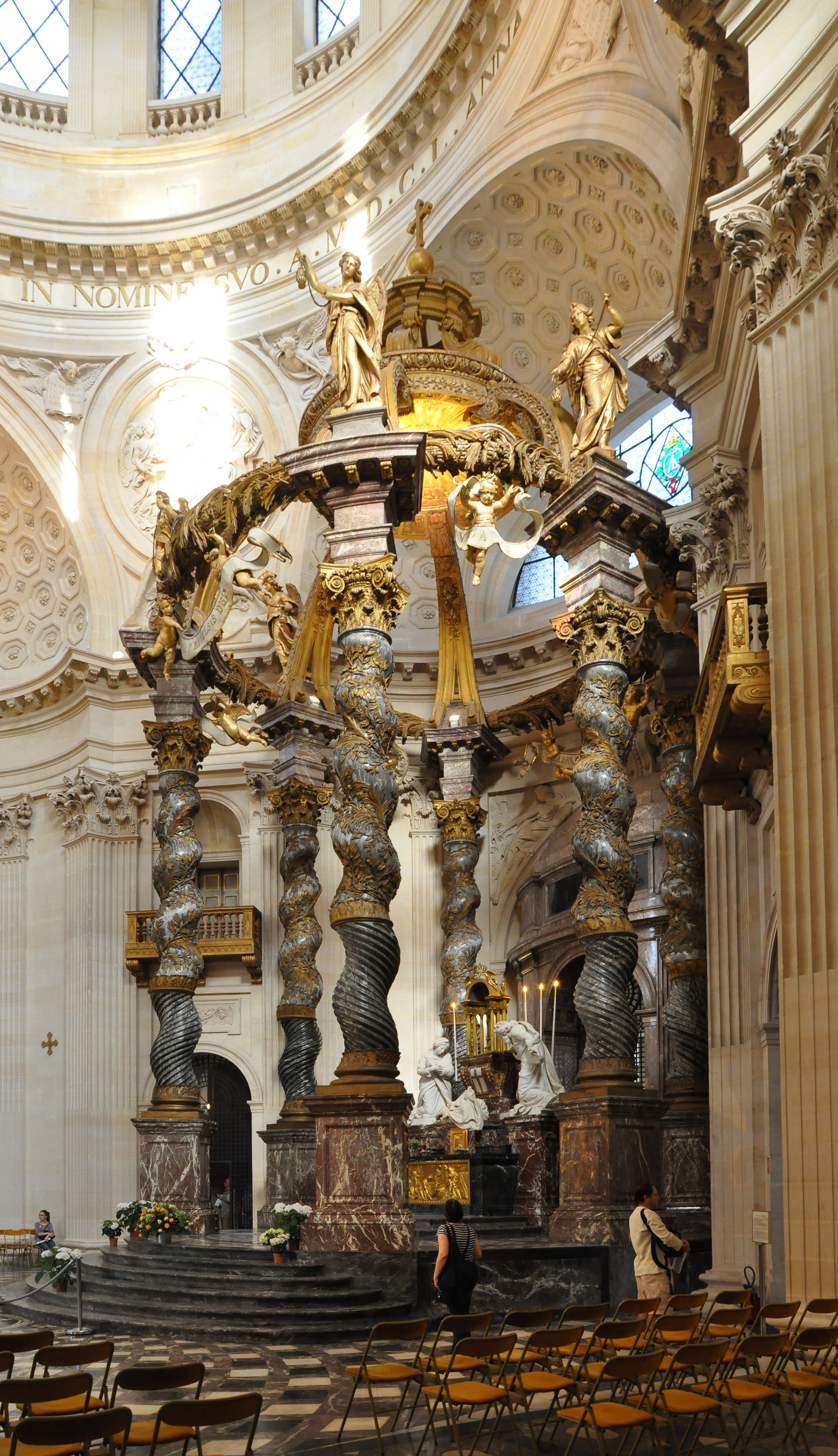
The baldachin and main altar

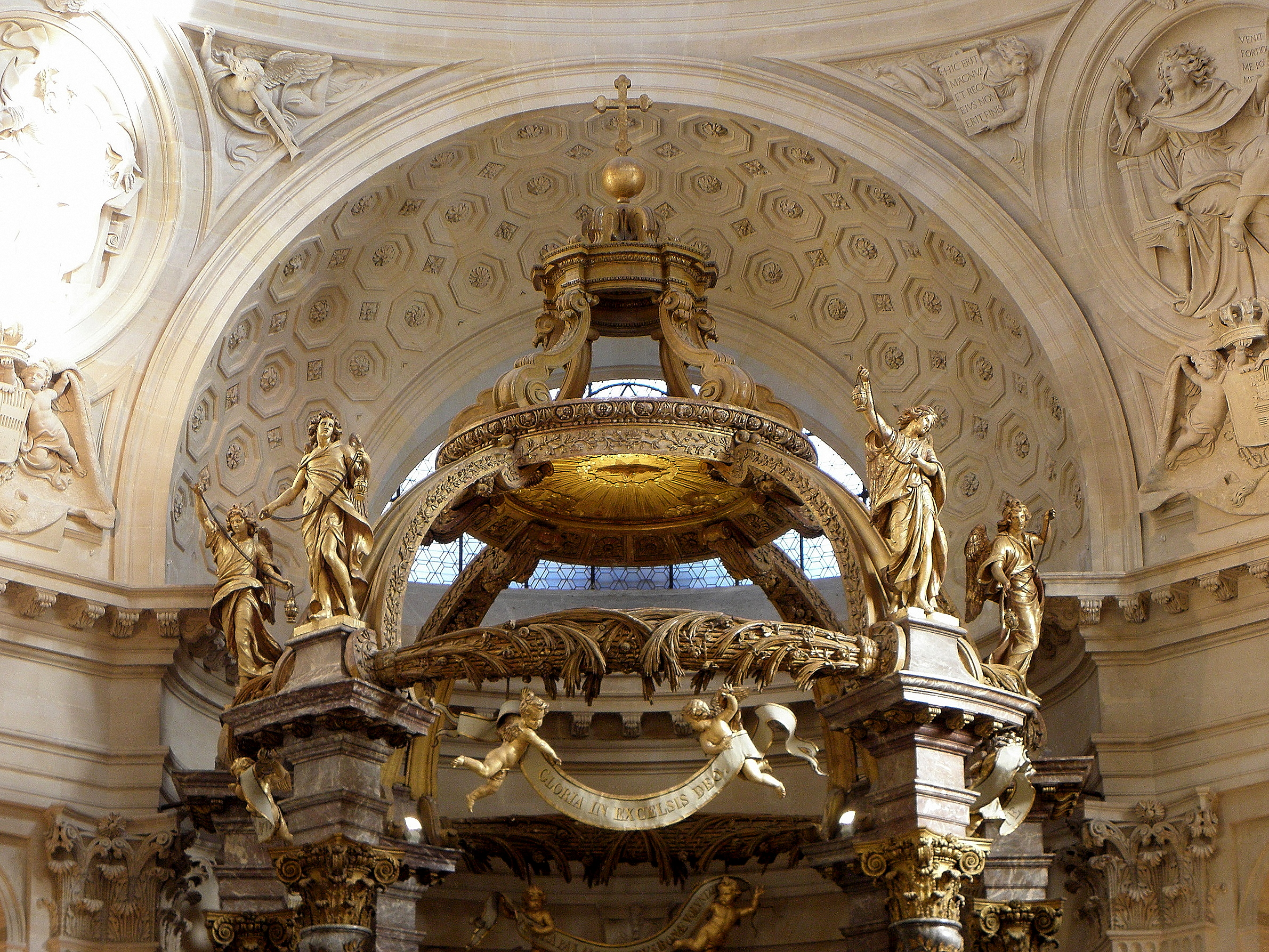
Top of the baldachin

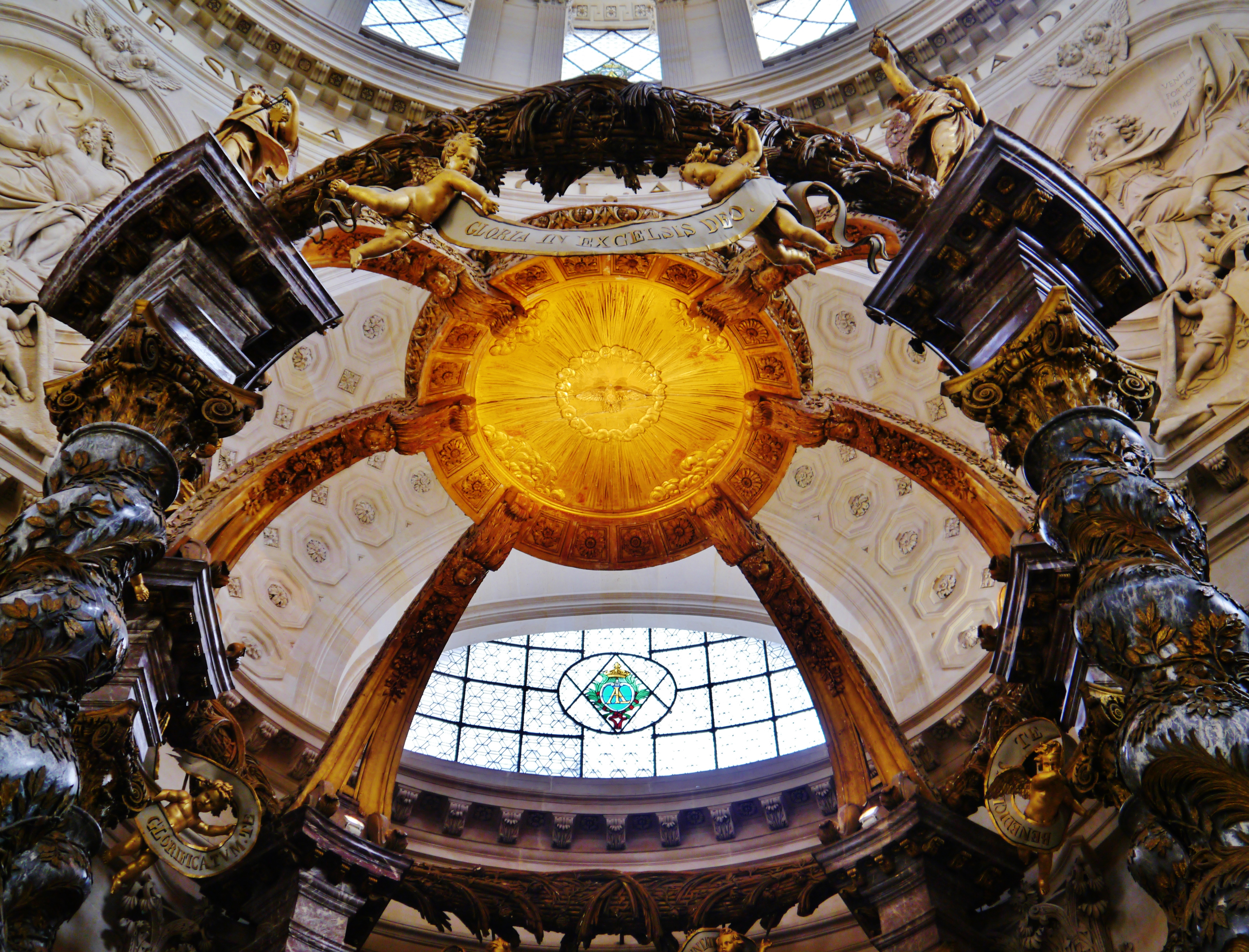
The upper portion of the baldachin

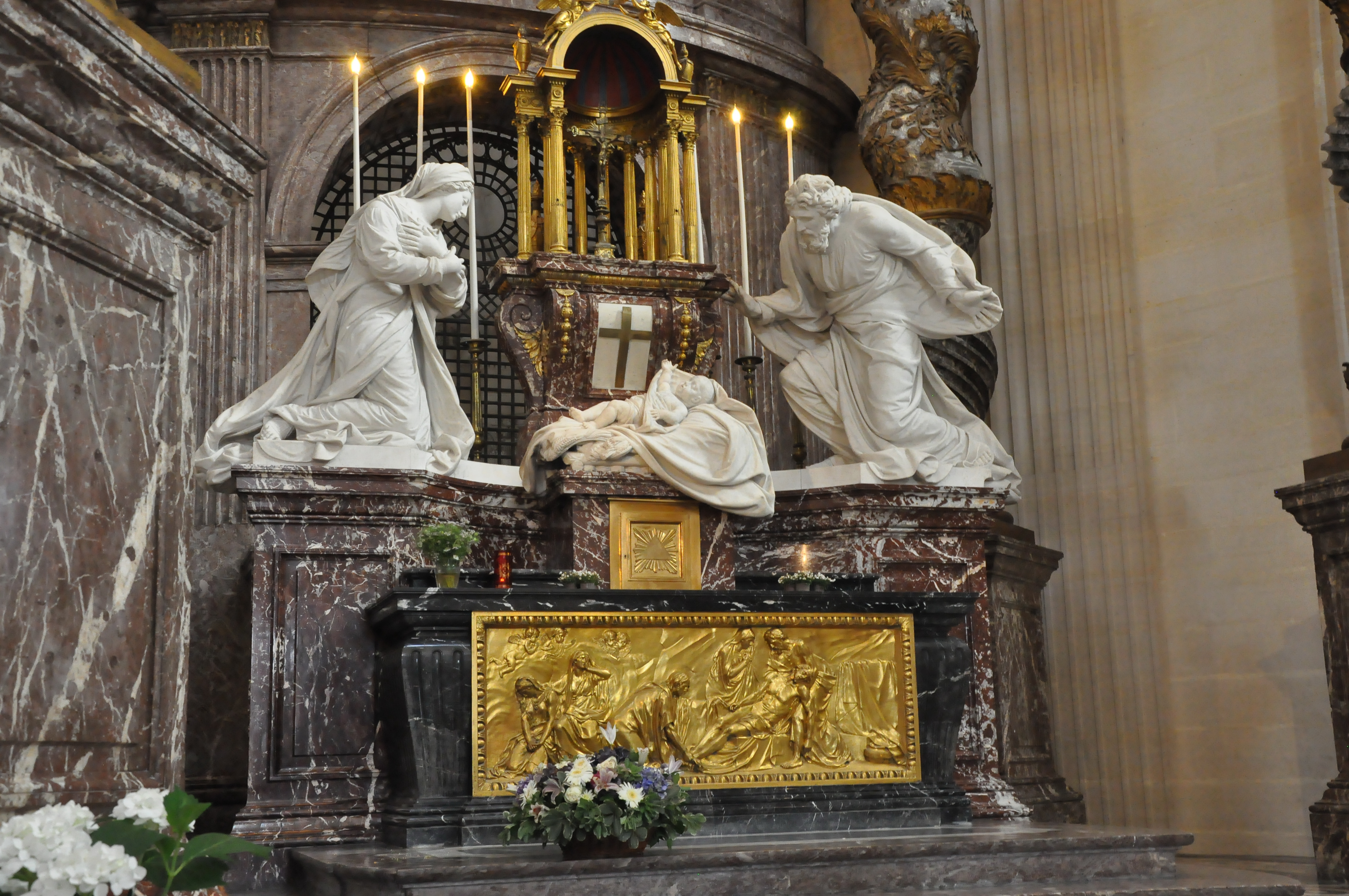
"The Nativity" sculpture and the altar

=== The Fresco in the Dome ===
The interior of the dome displays the best-known work of art in the church; a fresco painted in fourteen months by Pierre Mignard (1612-1695). It depicts "Heavenly Glory" and contains more than two hundred characters, including prophets, saints, martyrs, Fathers of the Church, and a few recognisable personalities, including its patroness, Queen Anne of Austria.

The dome of Val-de-Grâce was painted by Pierre Mignard and completed in 1666. Mignard was a rival of another famous painter of the era, Charles Le Brun. The painting was commissioned by Anne of Austria in 1663 and was done in fresco, painted on wet plaster. Fresco was more difficult than painting with oils, as it did not allow for second thoughts. Val-de-Grâce’s fresco was the first of its size in Paris. Only smaller painted cupolas existed, one in Eglise des Carmes and the other in the chapel of the Sorbonne. Some painting in oil pastel was later added to the fresco, but it faded soon after. Mignard’s painting was praised in "La Gloire du Val-de-Grâce", the only poem published by the playwright Molière, a friend of Mignard. The poem challenged the claims made in a poem by Charles Perrault about the genius of Mignard's rival, Le Brun.

The fresco depicts Anne of Austria being presented by St Anne and St Louis as she in turn presents the Holy Trinity with a model of the abbey built at her request. The painting is a spiral composition with more than two hundred figures presented in concentric circles. Mignard uses foreshortening of figures, many different colors, and lighting effects.

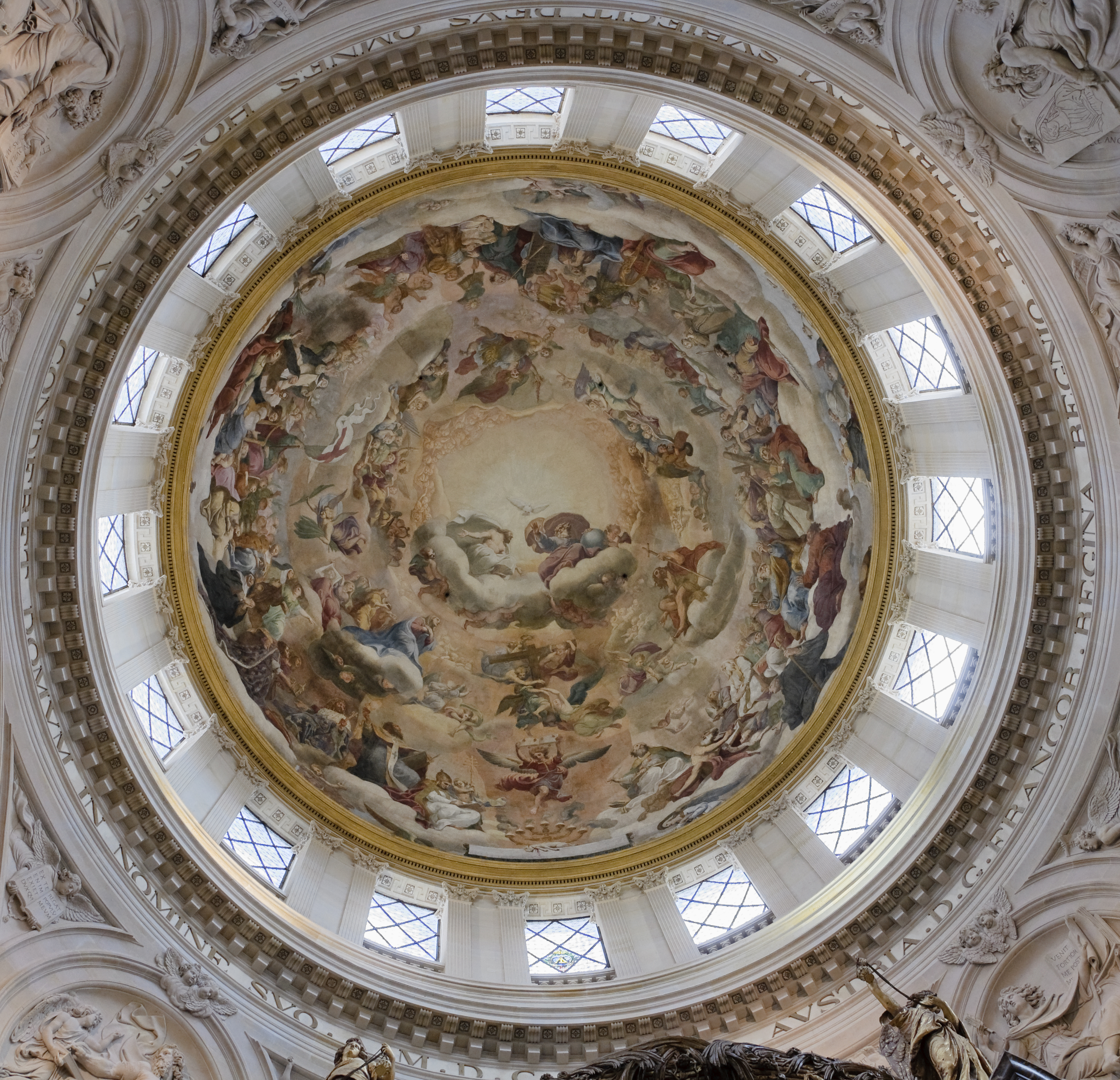
Heavenly Glory, fresco of the cupola by Pierre Mignard

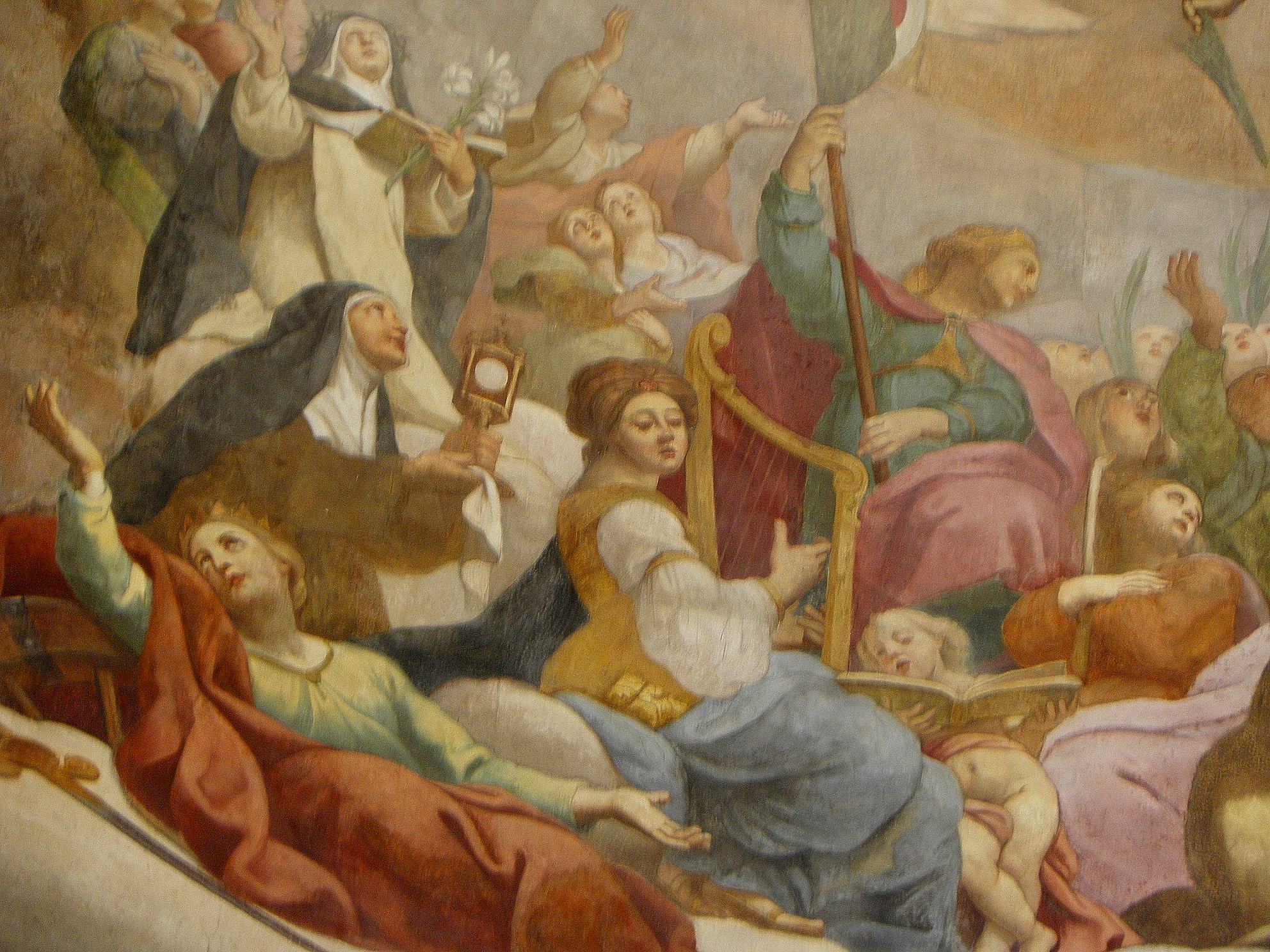
Detail of "Heavenly Glory" Fresco by Pierre Mignard

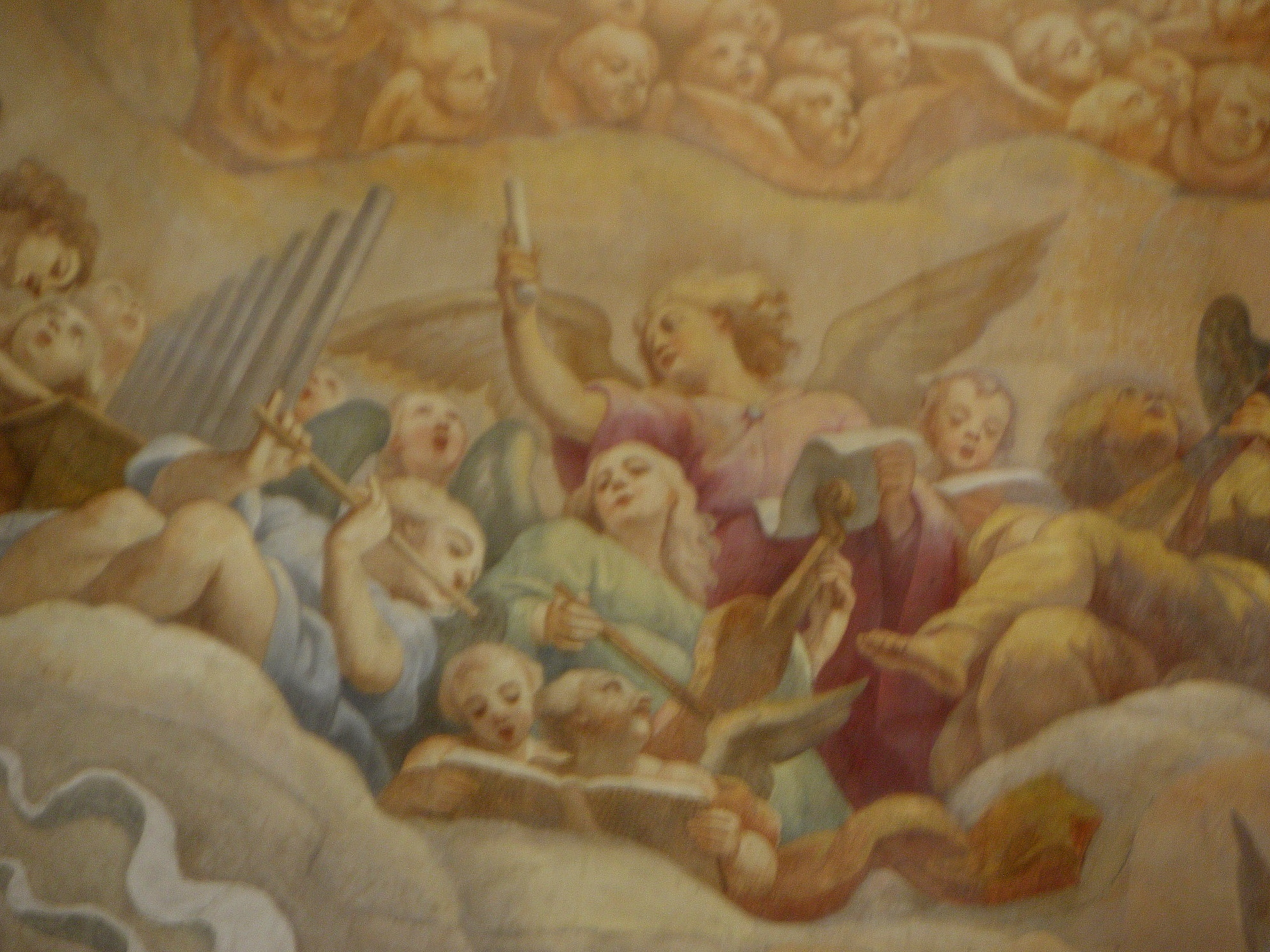
The Choir of Angels

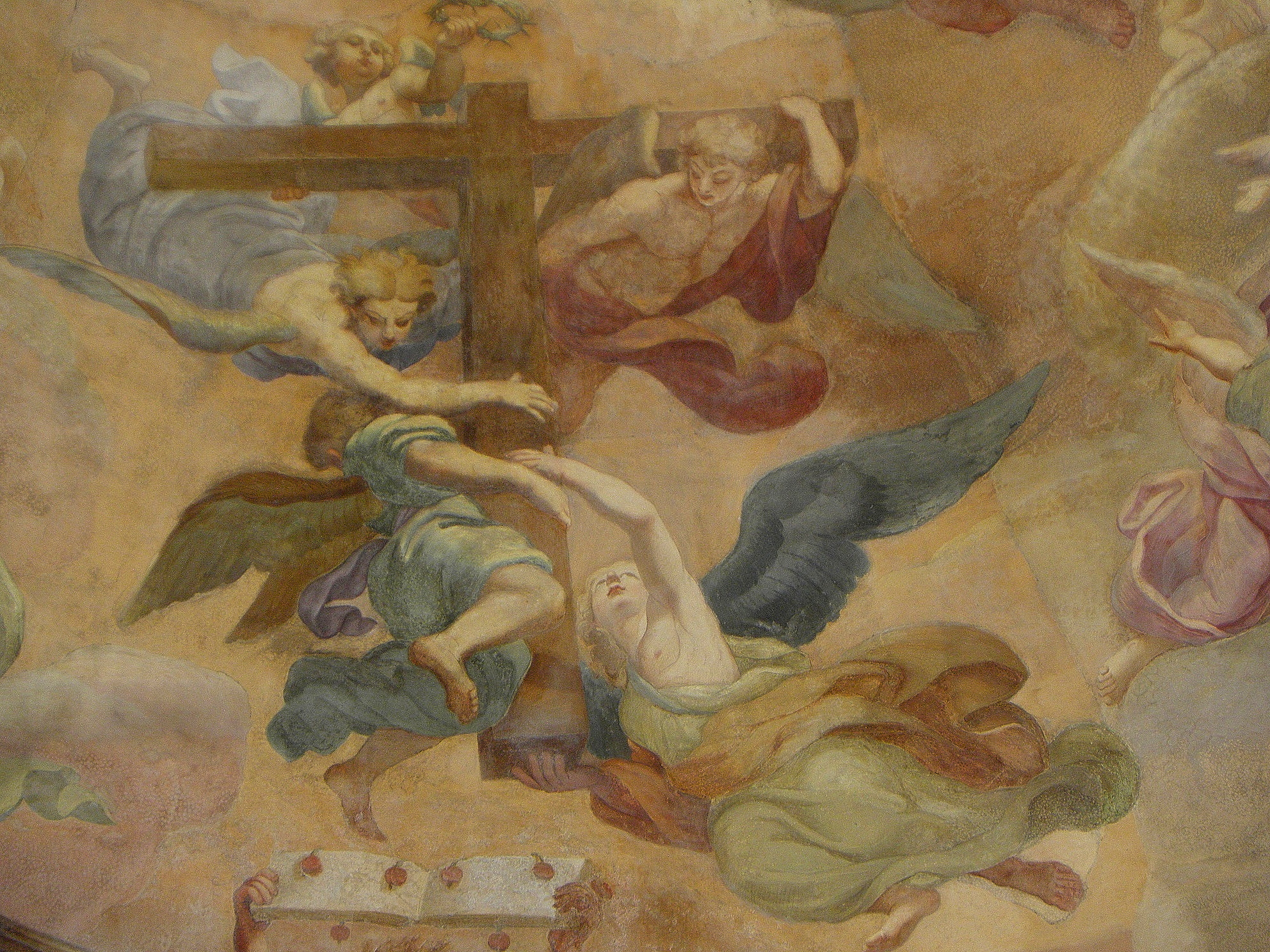
The cross carried to Heaven

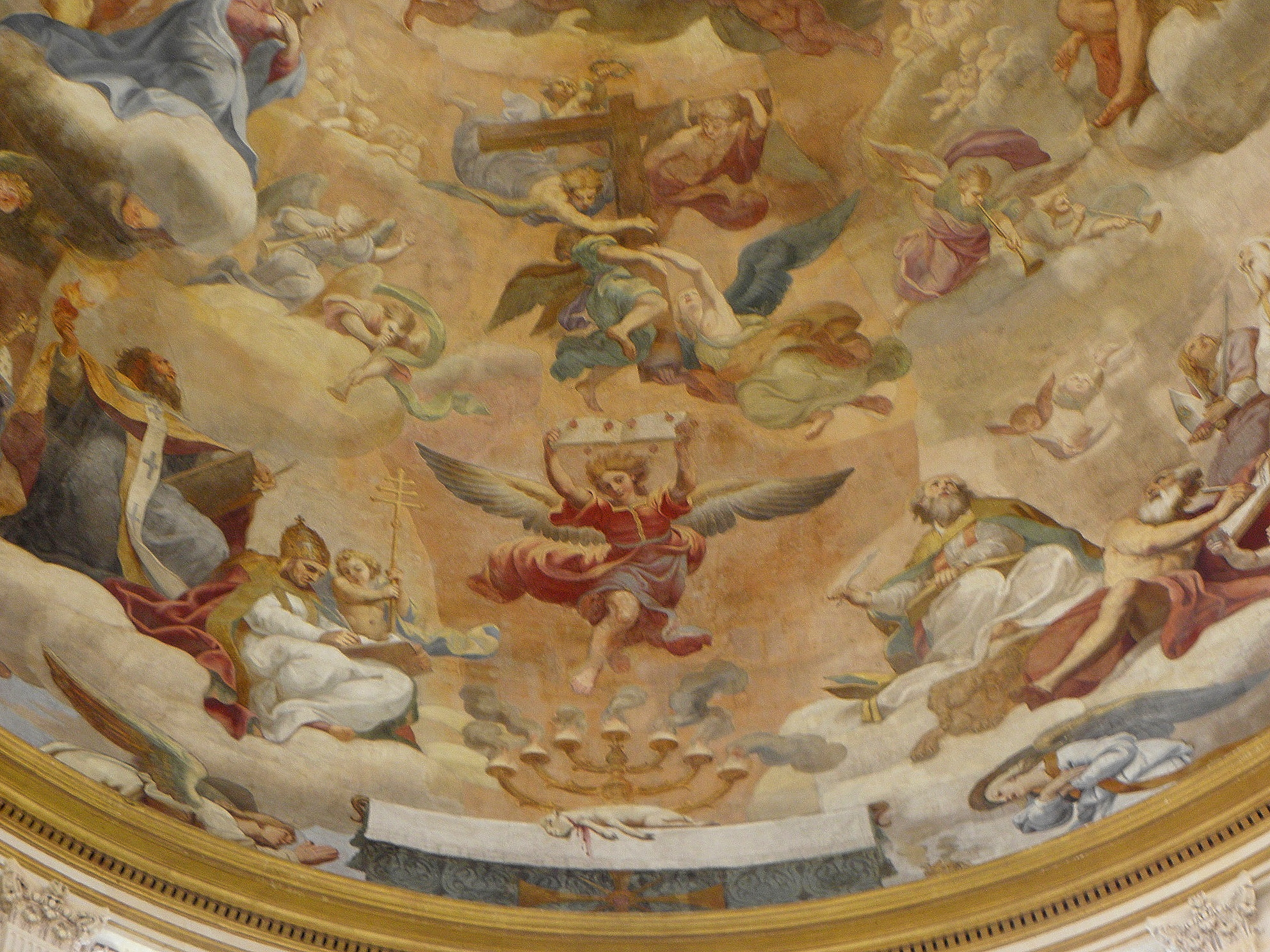

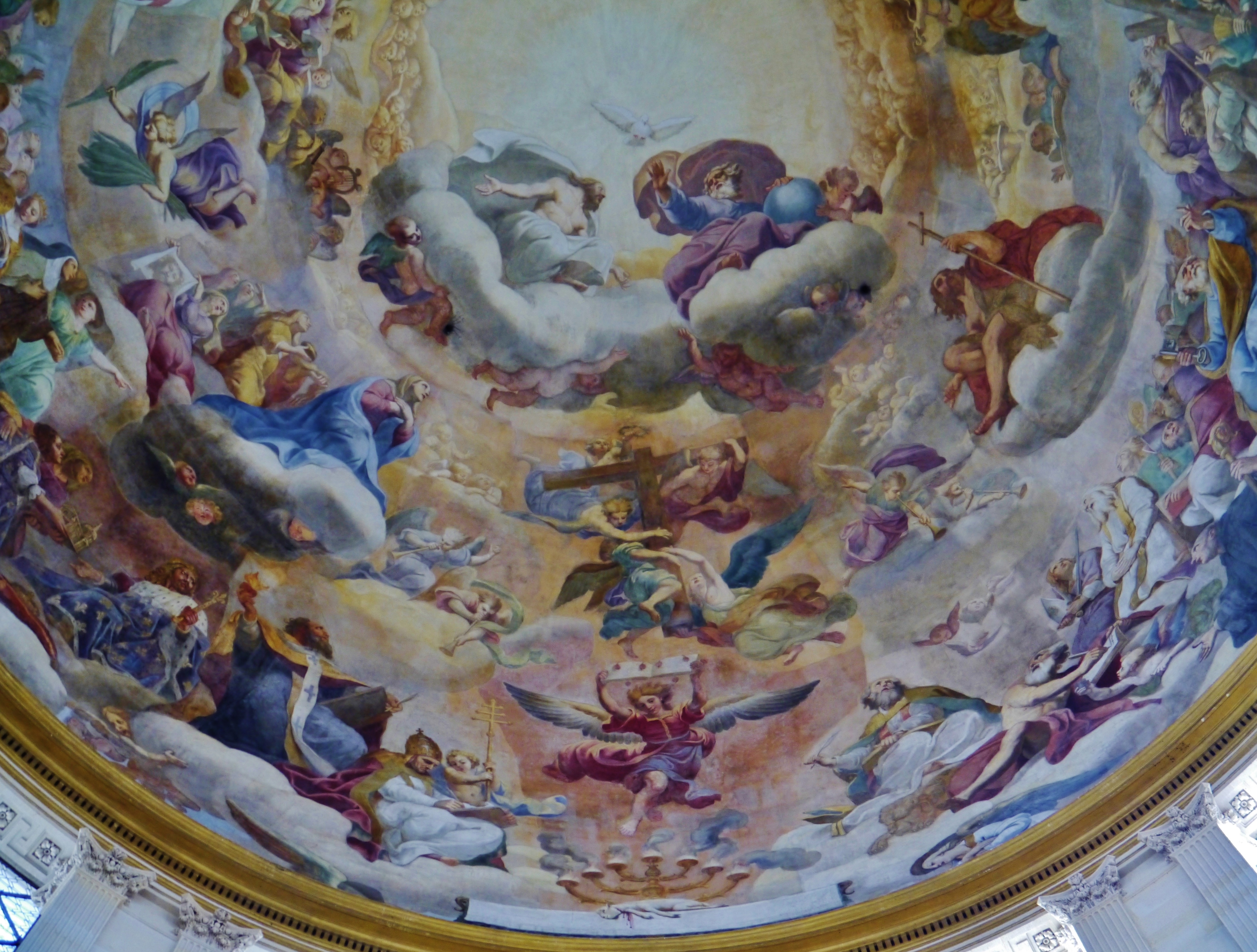
Detail of "Heavenly Glory"

== Chapels of Saint Anne and Saint Louis ==
The chapel on the right facing the altar, the Chapel of Saint-Louis, was originally used exclusively by the sisters of the convent. It was designed with a passage through which the sisters could pass to the Chapel of the Saint-Sacrament, where they could receive communion from the altar. without being seen by anyone else in the church. The chapel of the Holy Sacrament is decorated with four medallions by the sculptor Anguier, as well as a painting Christ Giving Communion to the Angels by Jean-Baptiste de Champaigne.

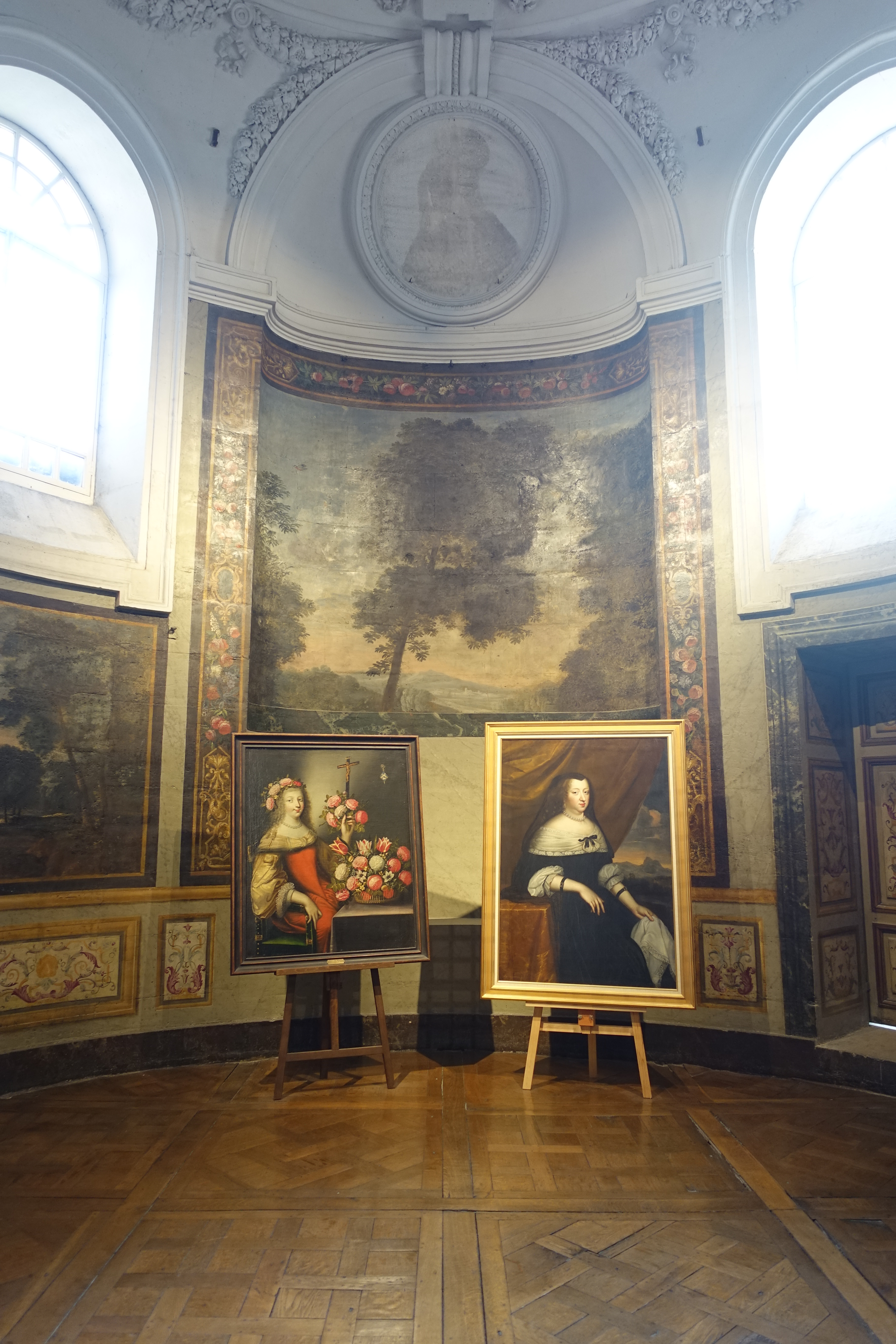
Chapel of Saint-Anne with portraits of Anne of Austria

On the left side of the altar is the Chapel of Saint-Anne. Until the French Revolution, the chapel held the preserved heart of Anne of Austria, kept in an urn within the altar. There is also a crypt beneath the altar which contained two marble cabinets, which, since 1662, contained urns holding the hearts of forty-five princes and princesses of the different branches of Royal Family of France. The hearts included those of Queen Marie-Therese, the wife of Louis XIV; and Philippe I of Orleans, the only brother of Louis XIV. The last person whose heart was placed there was the eldest son of Louis XVI, who died in 1789.

In 1792 during the French Revolution, the urn of hearts, along with other contents of the church, were put on sale. The hearts were purchased by the painter Martin Drolling to serve as an ingredient for making "mummy brown", a very expensive varnish made of heart tissue combined with alcohol, oil and other chemicals, which was believed to be the best protective coating for oil paintings. In exchange for the hearts, Drolling gave some of his own paintings, which are now found in the Louvre Museum and the Museum of the Palace of Versailles.

== The Organ ==
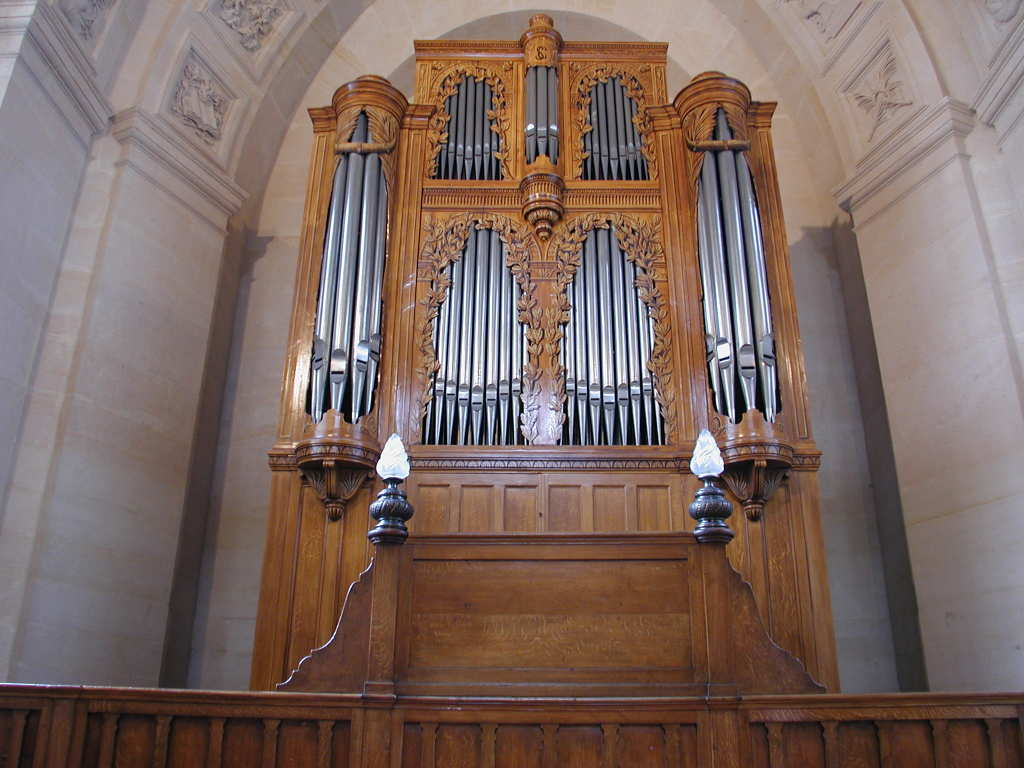
The organ built by Cavaillé-Coll (1852)

Little is known about any early organs in the church before the Revolution. The current organ, located in the chapel of Saint-Anne, was built by Aristide Cavaillé-Coll in 1852, who constructed the organs of Notre Dame de Paris, Saint-Sulpice, Sacre-Coeur basilica, the American Cathedral in Paris and other Paris churches. It was originally located in the Church of Saint-Genevieve, but was moved to Val-de-Grace in 1885 when the Church was converted to the Pantheon, a national shrine. It was restored to remove later additions and to bring back the rich sound associated with Cavaillé-Coll instruments. It was listed as an object of historical importance by the French Ministry of Culture in 1979. THE organ has twenty-one stops, two keyboards and a set of pedals. The church organist in February 2023 was Hervé Désarbre, organist of the French Ministry of Defense.

== Gallery ==
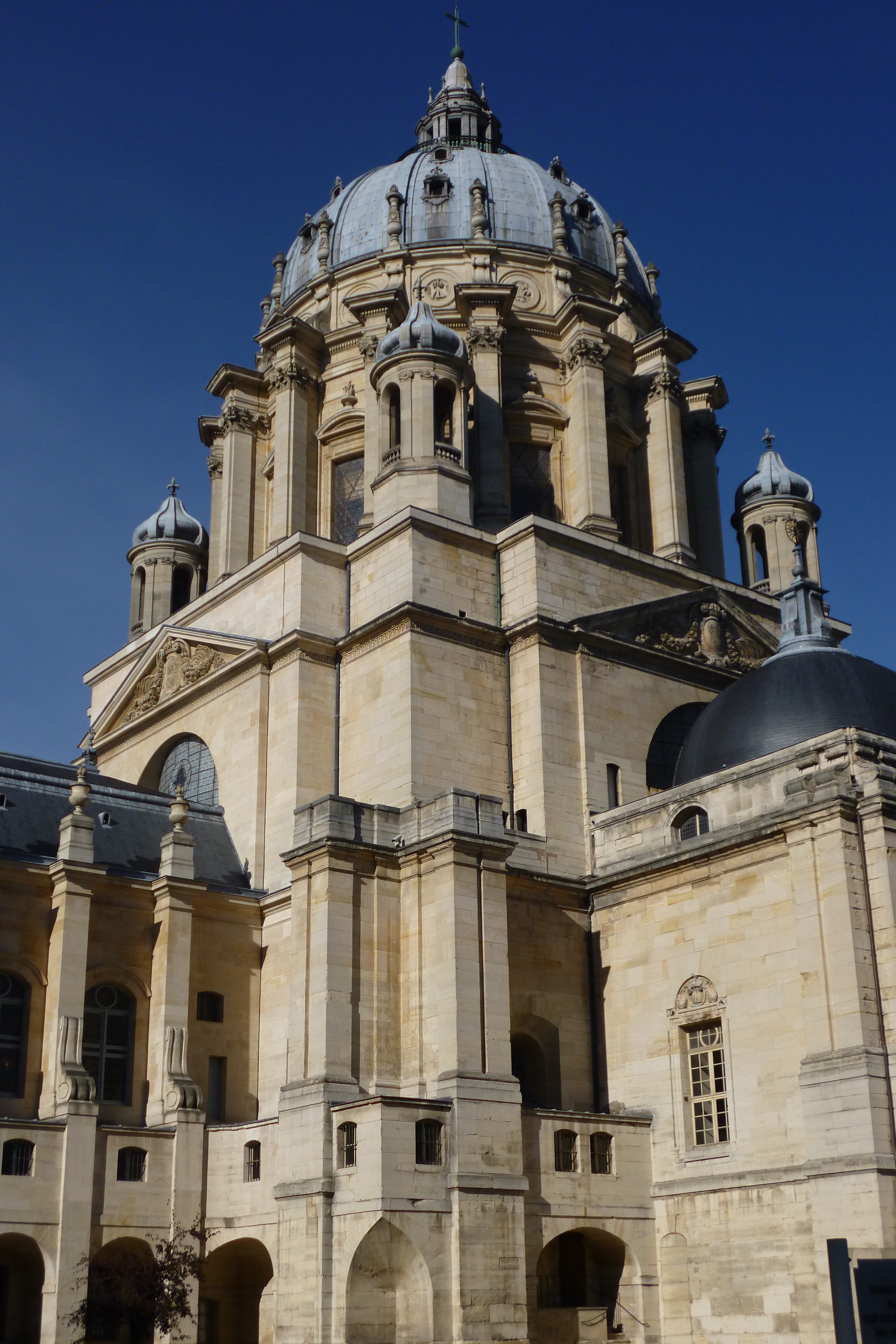
Crossing and dome from the southeast

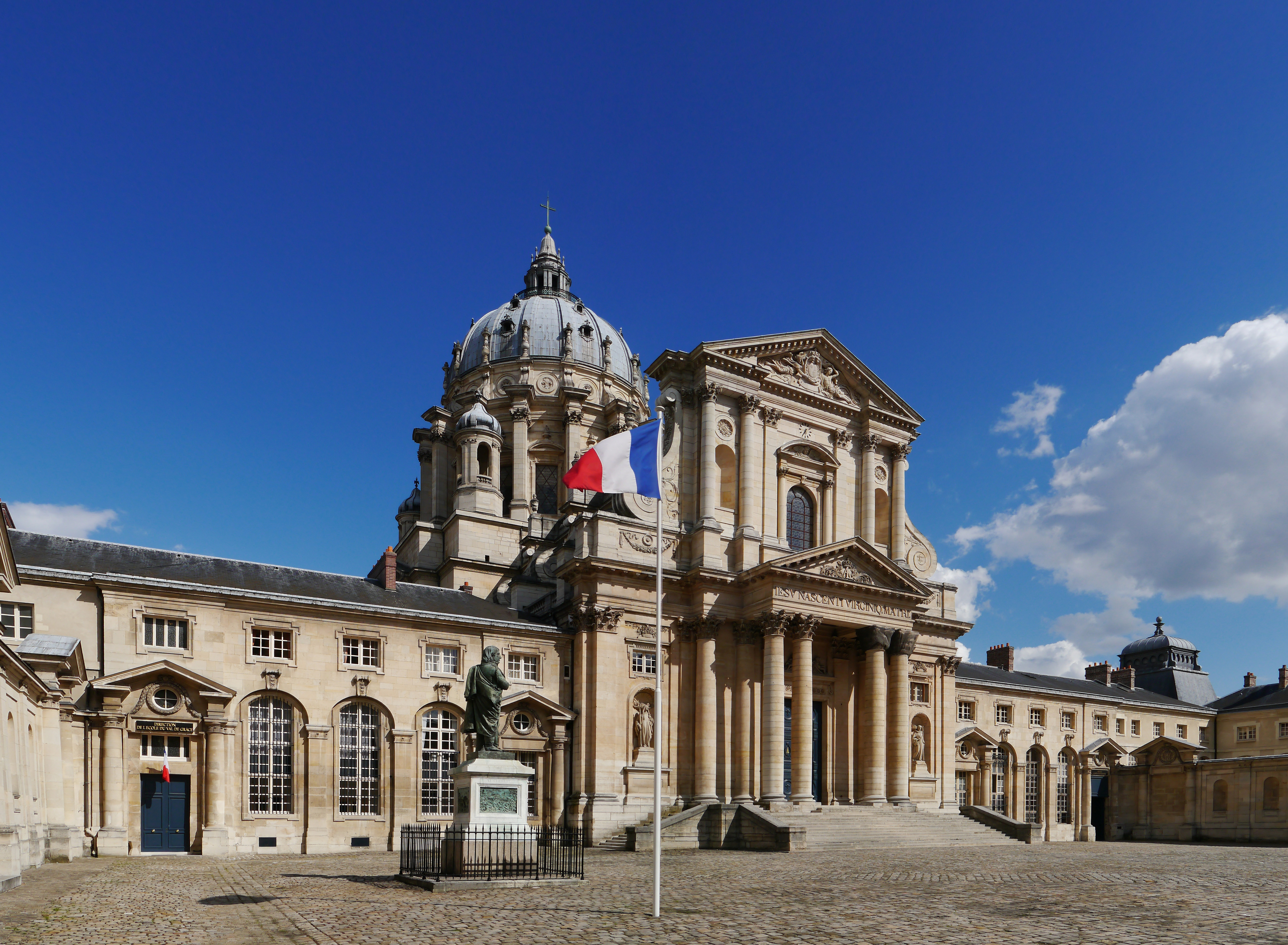
Main façade and forecourt from the rue Saint-Jacques

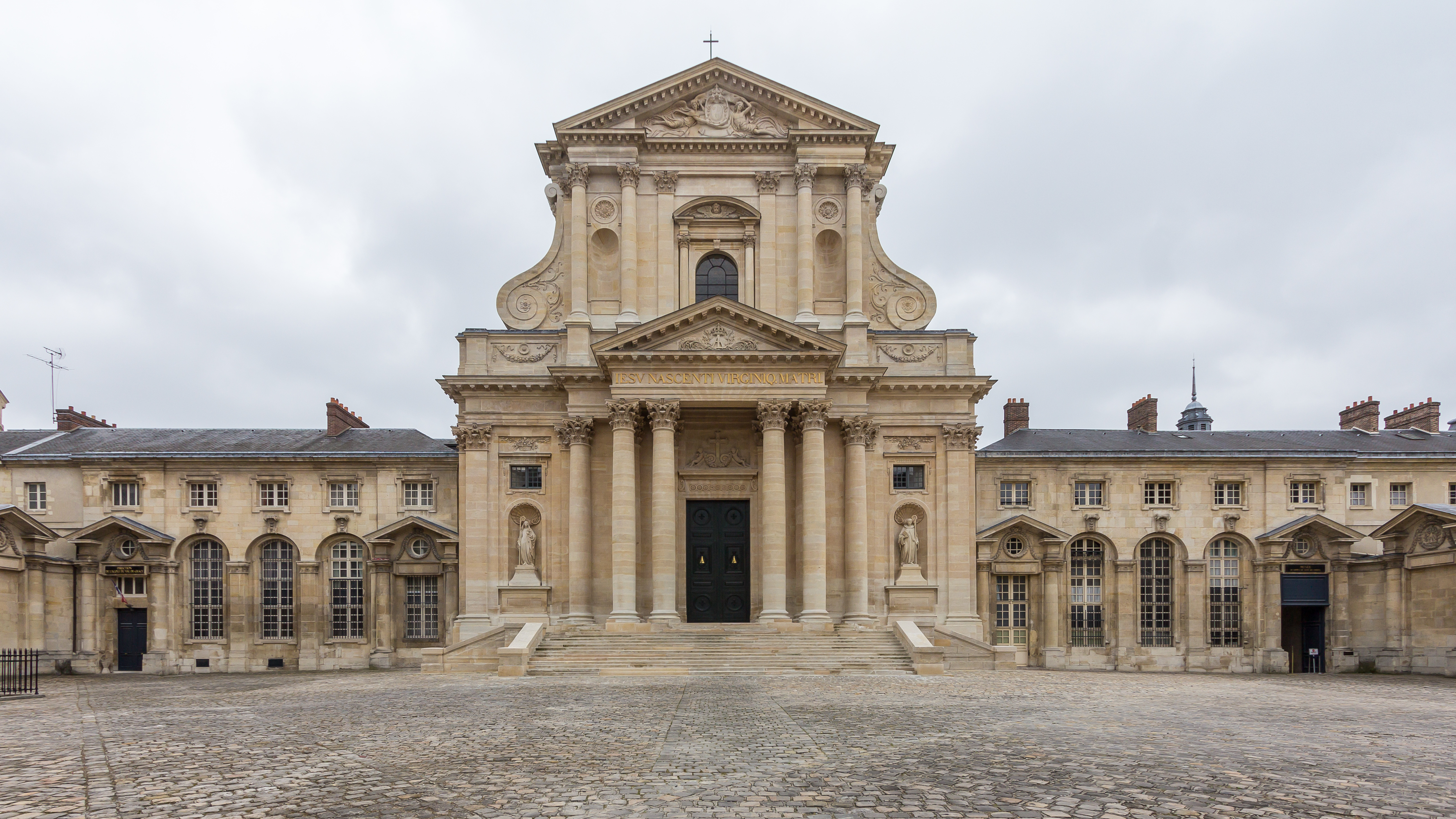
Main façade with adjacent monastic buildings

== See also ==
- List of historic churches in Paris
- Category:Burials at Val-de-Grâce (church)
- 17th-century Western domes

== Bibliography ==
- Ayers, Andrew (2004). The Architecture of Paris. Stuttgart; London: Edition Axel Menges. ISBN 9783930698967.
- Dumoulin, Aline; Ardisson, Alexandra; Maingard, Jérôme; Antonello, Murielle; Églises de Paris (2017), Éditions Massin, Issy-Les-Moulineaux, ISBN 978-2-7072-0683-1 (in French)
- Hillairet, Jacques; Connaissance du Vieux Paris; (2017); Éditions Payot-Rivages, Paris; (in French). ISBN 978-2-2289-1911-1 (In French)
