= Chief minister of France =

Medieval position akin to a head of government

The chief minister of France or, closer to the French term, chief minister of state (French: principal ministre d'État), or prime minister of France were and are informal titles given to various personages who received various degrees of power to rule the Kingdom of France on behalf of the monarch during the Ancien Régime ('Old Regime'). The appellation was not a position (nobody was ever appointed to the role of chief minister), but rather a job description for a royal favourite given wide-ranging powers as head of government. The chief minister was always a high official, often a secretary of state, or sometimes chancellor of France. When the monarch was a minor, the regent held this role.

== History ==
Like the title of chief minister was unofficial, the monarch maintained all his powers, giving to the chief minister the task to make effective his orders. However, during moments where the king was absent from the country, highly sick, indifferent or unfit to govern, the chief minister had a strong role, becoming the real mind behind the state's operating.

Usually, the chief ministers were members of the King's Council (the archaic form of cabinet) or high members of the French nobility or the Catholic clergy.

From 1661, Louis XIV and his successors, with varying degrees of success, sought to prevent any of their ministers from achieving supremacy over the others. The title of 'First Minister of State' was used, however the old title was not brought back after Louis XIV.

With the eruption of the French Revolution in 1789, the first minister of state progressively lost importance and influence inside national politics. Finally, with the coming of the constitutional monarchy in 1791, the title of first minister ceased to exist; executive power was vested elsewhere.

== List ==
=== Before 1792 ===
| Portrait | Name (Birth–Death) | Prior/Contemporary office | Term of office | | Estate | Cabinet | King (Reign) |
|---|---|---|---|---|---|---|---|
| | Anne de Montmorency, Baron and Seigneur of Chantilly (1493–1567) | Grand Master of France (1526–1558) | 1 January 1515 | June 1541 | Nobility | Cabinets of Francis I | Francis I (1515–1547) |
| | Anne de Montmorency, Baron and Seigneur of Chantilly (1493–1567) | Close friend of Francis I and paternal figure of Henry II. Concordat of Bologna. War of the League of Cambrai and the Italian Wars. Franco-Ottoman alliance. Attempt to make an alliance between France and Pope Paul III. Aggressive policy toward Emperor Charles V. Ordinance of Villers-Cotterêts establish the French as official language. Fell in disgrace due to Anne de Pisseleu's intrigues. | | | | Cabinets of Francis I | Francis I (1515–1547) |
| | Claude d'Annebault, Baron of Retz (1495–1552) | Admiral of France (1543–1552) | June 1541 | 31 March 1547 | Nobility | Cabinets of Francis I | Francis I (1515–1547) |
| | Claude d'Annebault, Baron of Retz (1495–1552) | Hero in the Battle of Pavia and Marshal of France yet. 5th Italian War. Peace with Emperor Charles V. Revolt of the Pitauds. Fall into disgrace after Francis I's death. | | | | Cabinets of Francis I | Francis I (1515–1547) |
| | Anne, Duke of Montmorency (1493–1567) | Grand Master of France (1526–1558) | 1 April 1547 | 10 August 1557 | Nobility | Cabinets of Henry II | Henry II (1547–1559) |
| | Anne, Duke of Montmorency (1493–1567) | Former favourite of Francis I and paternal figure for Henry II. Alliance between the Crown and the House of Guise. Rebellion in Bordeaux crushed. Raids on Metz, Toul and Verdun against Emperor Charles V. Defeat in the Battle of St. Quentin, he was imprisoned by Spain. Released only after 1558, he became non-influential in the new Guise-headed cabinet. | | | | Cabinets of Henry II | Henry II (1547–1559) |
| — | Position vacant (absolute rule by Henry II) | King of France (1547–1559) | 11 August 1557 | 10 July 1559 | Royalty | Cabinets of Henry II | Henry II (1547–1559) |
| — | Position vacant (absolute rule by Henry II) | Personally assumed the government. Despite the initial victory in the Siege of Calais, the defeat in the Battle of Gravelines led to the Peace of Cateau-Cambrésis, that ended the last Italian War. He continued his self-government until his death during a tournament in 1559. | | | | Cabinets of Henry II | Henry II (1547–1559) |
| | Francis, Duke of Guise (1519–1563) | Grand Master of France (1559–1563) | 10 July 1559 | 5 December 1560 | Nobility | Regency of Queen Mother Catherine | Francis II (1559–1560) |
| | Francis, Duke of Guise (1519–1563) | Brother of Mary of Guise, mother-in-law of Francis II, arch-Catholic chief and ally to Queen Catherine de' Medici. Amboise conspiracy foiled. Increased persecutions of Huguenots. Formation of the Catholic League along with his former rival Montmorency. Ousted from power by Catherine de' Medici after Francis II's death. Assassinated by Huguenot Jean de Poltrot in 1563. | | | | Regency of Queen Mother Catherine | Francis II (1559–1560) |
| | Michel de l'Hôpital (1507–1573) | Chancellor of France (1560–1573) | 5 December 1560 | 13 March 1573 † | Commoner | Cabinets of Charles IX | Charles IX (1560–1574) |
| | Michel de l'Hôpital (1507–1573) | Famous lawyer from the Parlement of Paris and prominent politique (moderates). Edict of Saint-Germain. Massacre of Wassy caused the eruption of religious civil wars. Peace of Longjumeau realised by Catherine de' Medici and King Charles IX. Siege of La Rochelle. Survived after St. Bartholomew's Day massacre. Died in office. | | | | Cabinets of Charles IX | Charles IX (1560–1574) |
| | Cardinal René de Birague (1506–1583) | Chancellor of France (1573–1583) | 30 May 1574 | 24 November 1583 † | Clergy | Cabinets of Henry III | Henry III (1574–1589) |
| | Cardinal René de Birague (1506–1583) | Close confidant of Catherine de' Medici. Signature of the Edict of Beaulieu. Died in office. | | | | Cabinets of Henry III | Henry III (1574–1589) |
| | Philippe Hurault, Count of Cheverny (1528–1599) | Chancellor of France (1583–1588) | 24 November 1583 | 12 May 1588 | Nobility | Cabinets of Henry III | Henry III (1574–1589) |
| | Philippe Hurault, Count of Cheverny (1528–1599) | Aligned with the Catholic League. War of the Three Henrys erupted. Ousted from office by the King after the Day of the Barricades. | | | | Cabinets of Henry III | Henry III (1574–1589) |
| — | Position vacant (absolute rule by Henry III) | King of France (1574–1589) | 12 May 1588 | 2 August 1589 | Royalty | Cabinets of Henry III | Henry III (1574–1589) |
| — | Position vacant (absolute rule by Henry III) | Fled from Paris after the Barricades. Assassination of the Duke of Guise, leader of the Catholic League, and his brother Cardinal Louis at Château de Blois. Murdered by Jacques Clément while marching toward Paris. | | | | Cabinets of Henry III | Henry III (1574–1589) |
| | Maximilien de Béthune, 1st Duke of Sully (1560–1641) | Superintendent of Finances (1600–1611) | 2 August 1589 | 29 January 1611 | Nobility | Cabinets of Henry IV | Henry IV (1589–1610) |
| | Maximilien de Béthune, 1st Duke of Sully (1560–1641) | Loyal minister of Henry IV since French Wars of Religion. Conversion of Henry IV to Catholicism. Free trade without restriction. Establishment of courthouses on misappropriation. Public works and new roads. Expansion of the Royal Army. Franco-Savoyard War. Organized marriage between Henry IV and Marie de' Medici. Edict of Nantes introduced religious tolerance to Protestants. Assassination of Henry IV by François Ravaillac, a Catholic fanatic. Isolated in the new Court, resigned and retired. | | | | Regency of Queen Mother Mary | Louis XIII (1610–1643) |
| | Nicolas de Neufville, 1st Marquis of Villeroy (1543–1617) | Secretary of State for Foreign Affairs (1594–1616) | 30 January 1611 | 9 August 1616 | Nobility | Regency of Queen Mother Mary | Louis XIII (1610–1643) |
| | Nicolas de Neufville, 1st Marquis of Villeroy (1543–1617) | Near to the extremist Catholic League. Instrumental minister in Marie de' Medici's hands, he favour a pro-Habsburg foreign policy. Progressively lost his favour. Removed from his appointment. | | | | Regency of Queen Mother Mary | Louis XIII (1610–1643) |
| | Concino Concini, 1st Marquis d'Ancre (1569–1617) | Marshal of France (1613–1617) | 9 August 1616 | 24 April 1617 † | Nobility | Regency of Queen Mother Mary | Louis XIII (1610–1643) |
| | Concino Concini, 1st Marquis d'Ancre (1569–1617) | Favourite of Marie de' Medici. He allowed a status of corruption and decay to the Court. Instrumental in the signature of the Treaty of Loudun. Murdered in the Louis XIII's coup d'état who overthrow the regency. | | | | Regency of Queen Mother Mary | Louis XIII (1610–1643) |
| | Charles d'Albert,1st Duke of Luynes (1578–1621) | Grand Falconer of France (1616–1621) | 24 April 1617 | 15 December 1621 † | Nobility | Cabinets of Louis XIII | Louis XIII (1610–1643) |
| | Charles d'Albert,1st Duke of Luynes (1578–1621) | Close advisor of Louis XIII and instigator of the regency's overthrow. Peace policy with Catholic powers. Organized marriage between Princess Christine and the Duke of Savoy. Treaty of Angoulême ended the quarrel between Marie de' Medici and Louis XIII. Second conflict between Marie and Louis. Start of the Huguenot rebellions. Died in office due to illness. | | | | Cabinets of Louis XIII | Louis XIII (1610–1643) |
| — | Position vacant (absolute rule by Louis XIII) | King of France (1610–1643) | 15 December 1621 | 12 August 1624 | Royalty | Cabinets of Louis XIII | Louis XIII (1610–1643) |
| — | Position vacant (absolute rule by Louis XIII) | Repression of the Huguenot troubles. Signature of the Treaty of Montpellier ended the first rebellion. Treaty of Compiégne with the United Provinces. French intervention in the Dutch Revolt. Rise of Cardinal Richelieu. | | | | Cabinets of Louis XIII | Louis XIII (1610–1643) |
| | Cardinal Armand Jean du Plessis, 1st Duke of Richelieu and Fronsac (1585–1642) | Secretary of State for Foreign Affairs & War (1616–1617) | 12 August 1624 | 4 December 1642 † | Clergy | Cabinets of Louis XIII | Louis XIII (1610–1643) |
| | Cardinal Armand Jean du Plessis, 1st Duke of Richelieu and Fronsac (1585–1642) | "Grey eminence" of Louis XIII. Establishment of a strong centralized apparatus and tensions with Habsburgs. Second Huguenot rebellion. End of the second rebellion with the Treaty of Paris. Valtelline Crisis. Creation of the Company of New France. Establishment of the Académie française. Third Huguenot rebellion. Siege of La Rochelle and the Edict of Alès brought to the decisive end of the rebellions. Tensions with the Queen Mother Marie de' Medici brought to the Day of the Dupes. Establishment of an efficient espionage system. Close partnership with Sweden established with the Treaty of Bärwalde. Cinq-Mars plots against Richelieu. Execution of Cinq-Mars. Died in office due to illness. | | | | Cabinets of Louis XIII | Louis XIII (1610–1643) |
| | Cardinal Jules Mazarin, 1st Duke of Mayenne and Rethel (1602–1661) | Bishop of Metz (1652–1658) | 5 December 1642 | 9 March 1661 † | Clergy | Cabinets of Louis XIII | Louis XIII (1610–1643) |
| | Cardinal Jules Mazarin, 1st Duke of Mayenne and Rethel (1602–1661) | "Grey eminence" of Queen Mother Anne and Louis XIV. Eruption of the Fronde. Peace of Westphalia concluded the Thirty Years' War. End of the Eighty Years' War and recognizement of the United Provinces. Creation of the League of the Rhine. Repression of the Fronde. Formulary controversy. Treaty of the Pyrenees and peace with Habsburgs. Died in office due to illness. | | | | Regency of Queen Mother Anne | Louis XIV (1643–1715) |
| | Cardinal Jules Mazarin, 1st Duke of Mayenne and Rethel (1602–1661) | "Grey eminence" of Queen Mother Anne and Louis XIV. Eruption of the Fronde. Peace of Westphalia concluded the Thirty Years' War. End of the Eighty Years' War and recognizement of the United Provinces. Creation of the League of the Rhine. Repression of the Fronde. Formulary controversy. Treaty of the Pyrenees and peace with Habsburgs. Died in office due to illness. | | | | Cabinets of Louis XIV | Louis XIV (1643–1715) |
| | Jean-Baptiste Colbert (1619–1683) | Controller-General of Finances (1661–1683) | 9 March 1661 | 6 September 1683 † | Commoner | Cabinets of Louis XIV | Louis XIV (1643–1715) |
| | Jean-Baptiste Colbert (1619–1683) | First member of the bourgeoisie to lead a Ministry. Financial reforms: Mercantilism introduced. New great public works, such as the Canal du Midi, Tuileries Garden, Porte Saint-Martin and Porte Saint-Denis. Promotion of the culture: French Academy of Sciences, Paris Observatory and Royal Academy of Architecture are founded. War of Devolution. Establishment of the East India and West India companies. Treaties of Nijmegen. Affair of the Poisons caused public scandal in France. Died in office due to illness. | | | | Cabinets of Louis XIV | Louis XIV (1643–1715) |
| | François-Michel Le Tellier, 1st Marquis of Louvois (1641–1691) | Secretary of State for War & Maison du Roi (1662–1691) | 7 September 1683 | 16 July 1691 † | Nobility | Cabinets of Louis XIV | Louis XIV (1643–1715) |
| | François-Michel Le Tellier, 1st Marquis of Louvois (1641–1691) | Former rival of Colbert and founder of Les Invalides. War of the Reunions. Edict of Fontainebleau restored the persecutions against Huguenots. Dragonnades caused Huguenots' getaway from France and financial crisis. The Sack of Palatinate alienated German support to Louis XIV. Nine Years' War. His advised policy to Louis XIV caused the reign's decline. Died in office due to apoplexy or poisoning. | | | | Cabinets of Louis XIV | Louis XIV (1643–1715) |
| — | Position vacant (absolute rule by Louis XIV) | King of France (1643–1715) | 17 July 1691 | 1 September 1715 | Royalty | Cabinets of Louis XIV | Louis XIV (1643–1715) |
| — | Position vacant (absolute rule by Louis XIV) | War of the Spanish Succession and establishment of the Bourbon dynasty in Spain. Treaty of Ryswick. Palace of Versailles completed. Start of the Age of Enlightenment. Died reigning due to health problems. | | | | Cabinets of Louis XIV | Louis XIV (1643–1715) |
| | Cardinal Guillaume Dubois (1656–1723) | Secretary of State for Foreign Affairs (1718–1723) | 12 September 1715 | 10 August 1723 † | Clergy | Regency of The Duke of Orléans | Louis XV (1715–1774) |
| | Cardinal Guillaume Dubois (1656–1723) | Third "Grey Eminence" of the Kingdom. Signature of the Triple Alliance and War of the Quadruple Alliance. Cellamare and Pontcallec conspirancies. Died in office due to health problems. | | | | Cabinets of Louis XV | Louis XV (1715–1774) |
| | Philippe II, 13th Duke of Orléans (1674–1723) | Regent of the Kingdom (1715–1723) | 10 August 1723 | 2 December 1723 † | Nobility | Cabinets of Louis XV | Louis XV (1715–1774) |
| | Philippe II, 13th Duke of Orléans (1674–1723) | Former Regent, replacing Cardinal Dubois. Died in office less than 4 months later. | | | | Cabinets of Louis XV | Louis XV (1715–1774) |
| | Louis Henri, Duke of Bourbon (1692–1740) | Grand Master of France (1710–1740) | 2 December 1723 | 11 June 1726 | Nobility | Cabinets of Louis XV | Louis XV (1715–1774) |
| | Louis Henri, Duke of Bourbon (1692–1740) | New persecution against French Protestants. Unigenitus Bull. Marriage organized between Louis XV and Marie Leszczyńska. Law System failed. Financial crisis and Lit de justice. Disagreements with Louis XV's new favourite, the Bishop Fleury, caused his downfall and exile in disgrace. | | | | Cabinets of Louis XV | Louis XV (1715–1774) |
| | Cardinal André-Hercule de Fleury (1653–1743) | Bishop of Fréjus (1699–1715) | 11 June 1726 | 29 January 1743 † | Clergy | Cabinets of Louis XV | Louis XV (1715–1774) |
| | Cardinal André-Hercule de Fleury (1653–1743) | Close advisor of Louis XV. Colbertism reintroduced and support to Gallicanism. Jansenism became tolerated. Anti-Masonry policy. Defeat in the War of the Polish Succession and Treaty of Vienna. War of the Austrian Succession and Treaty of Aachen. Died in office due to health problems. | | | | Cabinets of Louis XV | Louis XV (1715–1774) |
| — | Position vacant (absolute rule by Louis XV) | King of France (1715–1774) | 29 January 1743 | 3 December 1758 | Royalty | Cabinets of Louis XV | Louis XV (1715–1774) |
| — | Position vacant (absolute rule by Louis XV) | Personal rule of Louis XV caused a rising public debt and scandal at Court. Madame de Pompadour acted as the de facto chief minister. Eruption of the Seven Years' War. | | | | Cabinets of Louis XV | Louis XV (1715–1774) |
| | Étienne François de Choiseul; 1st Duke of Choiseul (1719–1785) | Secretary of State for Foreign Affairs & War (1761–1770) | 3 December 1758 | 24 December 1770 | Nobility | Cabinets of Louis XV | Louis XV (1715–1774) |
| | Étienne François de Choiseul; 1st Duke of Choiseul (1719–1785) | He led France in the Seven Years' War. Failed invasion of Britain. "Family Pact" and Spanish intervention beside France. Defeat in the Seven Years' War and loss of New France to the British. French conquest of Corsica. Support to Spain during Falkland Crisis. Resigned and retired. | | | | Cabinets of Louis XV | Louis XV (1715–1774) |
| | René-Nicolas de Maupeou (1714–1792) | Chancellor of France (1768–1774) | 25 December 1770 | 23 August 1774 | Nobility | Cabinets of Louis XV | Louis XV (1715–1774) |
| | René-Nicolas de Maupeou (1714–1792) | Failed attempt to establish an Enlightened absolutism. Tensions with the Parlements. Fight against upper classes on privileges and farms. Envoy of musketeers against Parliament's magistrates. Suppression of the Court of Aids. Despite his success against magistrates' power abuses, Louis XVI preferred search an agreement with them. Resigned due to disagreements with the new King. | | | | Cabinets of Louis XVI | Louis XVI (1774–1792) |
| | Jacques Turgot (1727–1781) | Controller-General of Finances (1774–1776) | 24 August 1774 | 12 May 1776 | Commoner | Cabinets of Louis XVI | Louis XVI (1774–1792) |
| | Jacques Turgot (1727–1781) | Second bourgeois who formed a Ministry. Physiocratic fiscal policies. Ferme générale reformed. Negotiation with Dutch bankers to solve the state debts. French intervention in the American Revolutionary War. Flour War. His rivalship with Jacques Necker and the Count of Maurepas's envy caused his fall. Accused to negligence, he was ousted from office. | | | | Cabinets of Louis XVI | Louis XVI (1774–1792) |
| | Jean-Frédéric Phélypeaux, 3rd Count of Maurepas (1701–1781) | Secretary of State of the Navy (1723–1749) | 14 May 1776 | 21 November 1781 † | Nobility | Cabinets of Louis XVI | Louis XVI (1774–1792) |
| | Jean-Frédéric Phélypeaux, 3rd Count of Maurepas (1701–1781) | Former ally of Turgot, who intrigued against him, being envious of his position. He continued the status of privilege of the upper classes, but finally became a patron of Necker. Died in office due to health problems. | | | | Cabinets of Louis XVI | Louis XVI (1774–1792) |
| | Charles Gravier, Count of Vergennes (1717–1787) | Secretary of State for Foreign Affairs (1774–1787) | 21 November 1781 | 13 February 1787 † | Nobility | Cabinets of Louis XVI | Louis XVI (1774–1792) |
| | Charles Gravier, Count of Vergennes (1717–1787) | Great diplomat, decisive in the diplomacy of the American Revolution. Treaty of Paris and recognition of the United States. Franco-Austrian Alliance consolidated. Batavian Revolution. Expeditions in Indochina. He was dissident of Necker and his reformist's views. Died in office during the Assembly of Notables. | | | | Cabinets of Louis XVI | Louis XVI (1774–1792) |
| | Archbishop Étienne Charles de Loménie (1727–1794) | Archbishop of Toulouse (1763–1788) | 1 May 1787 | 25 August 1788 | Clergy | Cabinets of Louis XVI | Louis XVI (1774–1792) |
| | Archbishop Étienne Charles de Loménie (1727–1794) | Replacing Vergennes, who died during the Assembly of Notables. Rising influence of Marie Antoinette. New disagreements with parliamentarians on estate tax and corvée. Resigned due to political difficulties. | | | | Cabinets of Louis XVI | Louis XVI (1774–1792) |
| | Jacques Necker (1732–1804) | Controller-General of Finances (1777–1781/1788–1789) | 25 August 1788 | 11 July 1789 | Commoner | Cabinets of Louis XVI | Louis XVI (1774–1792) |
| | Jacques Necker (1732–1804) | Appointed by Louis XVI to solve the financial crisis. Day of Tiles and Assembly of Vizille. Estates General summoned in Spring 1789. However, the reforms called for by the Estates, especially the Third Estate (commoners), caused his political decline and removal by the King. | | | | Cabinets of Louis XVI | Louis XVI (1774–1792) |
| | Louis Auguste Le Tonnelier, Baron of Breteuil (1730–1807) | Secretary of State of the Maison du Roi (1783–1788) | 11 July 1789 | 16 July 1789 | Nobility | Cabinets of Louis XVI | Louis XVI (1774–1792) |
| | Louis Auguste Le Tonnelier, Baron of Breteuil (1730–1807) | Shortest ministry in two centuries. Eruption of the French Revolution with the storming of the Bastille. Fled France two days after the Bastille. | | | | Cabinets of Louis XVI | Louis XVI (1774–1792) |
| | Jacques Necker (1732–1804) | Controller-General of Finances (1777–1781/1788–1789) | 16 July 1789 | 3 September 1790 | Commoner | Cabinets of Louis XVI | Louis XVI (1774–1792) |
| | Jacques Necker (1732–1804) | Recalled to office by Louis XVI. He distrusted eminent politicians like Lafayette, too dual, and Mirabeau, too schemer. He also rejected the use of assignats. When his popularity fell, he retired to Coppet Castle, Switzerland. | | | | Cabinets of Louis XVI | Louis XVI (1774–1792) |
| | Armand Marc, Count of Montmorin and Saint-Hérem (1745–1792) | Secretary of State for Foreign Affairs (1787–1789) | 3 September 1790 | 3 September 1791 | Nobility | Cabinets of Louis XVI | Louis XVI (1774–1792) |
| | Armand Marc, Count of Montmorin and Saint-Hérem (1745–1792) | Former member of the conservative clique of Versailles, he became a puppet in Mirabeau and La Marck's hands. After Mirabeau's death, he resigned from his position. He was later killed during September Massacres. | | | | Constitutional Cabinet of Louis XVI | Louis XVI (1774–1792) |
| — | Position vacant (supervisioned by Legislative Assembly) | N/A | 3 September 1791 | 21 September 1792 | N/A | Constitutional Cabinet of Louis XVI | Louis XVI (1774–1792) |
| — | Position vacant (supervisioned by Legislative Assembly) | Under the new Constitution, Louis XVI became time by time ever more useless and weak, while the real power was exercised by the Legislative Assembly, who proposed to the King Girondin ministers. His popularity collapsed after the flight to Varennes. After the Brunswick Manifesto, tension between Monarchists and Republicans increased. The storming of Tuileries ended the centuries-old monarchy, establishing the First Republic. | | | | Constitutional Cabinet of Louis XVI | Louis XVI (1774–1792) |

=== First French Empire (1804–1814) ===
| Chief minister | Term of office | | | Political party | Emperor (Reign) |
|---|---|---|---|---|---|
| Position vacant | 1 | 18 May 1804 | 1 April 1814 | Vacant | Napoleon I (1804–1814) |

=== Kingdom of France (1814–1815) ===
| Portrait | Name (Birth–Death) | Prior/Contemporary office | Term of office | | Political Party | Government | King (Reign) |
|---|---|---|---|---|---|---|---|
| | Charles Maurice, Prince of Talleyrand (1754–1838) | Minister of Foreign Affairs (1799–1807) | 1 April 1814 | 2 May 1814 | Legitimist | Prov. Gov. | Louis XVIII (1814–1815) |
| | Charles Maurice, Prince of Talleyrand (1754–1838) | Minister of Foreign Affairs (1799–1807) | Creation of the Charter of 1814. Napoleon exiled in his "reign" on Elba. Removed by Louis XVIII after his arrival from England, due to his Bonapartist past. | | | | Louis XVIII (1814–1815) |
| | Pierre-Louis, Count of Blacas (1771–1839) | Minister for the Maison du Roi (1814–1815) | 2 May 1814 | 20 March 1815 | Legitimist | King's Ministry | Louis XVIII (1814–1815) |
| | Pierre-Louis, Count of Blacas (1771–1839) | Minister for the Maison du Roi (1814–1815) | De facto Chief Minister, due to Louis XVIII's rift with Talleyrand. Despite Talleyrand's role as envoy to the Congress of Vienna, Metternich negotiate secretly with Louis XVIII and Blacas. Fled with the Royals to Ghent during the Hundred Days. Having fallen in disgrace after the return in Paris, he was dismissed and sent as Ambassador to the Kingdom of the Two Sicilies. | | | | Louis XVIII (1814–1815) |

=== Hundred Days (1815) ===
| Chief Minister | Term of office | | | Political party | Emperor (Reign) |
|---|---|---|---|---|---|
| Position vacant (absolute rule by Napoleon I) | 2 | 20 March 1815 | 22 June 1815 | Vacant | Napoleon I (1815) |
| Joseph Fouché (1759–1820) (as President of the Executive Commission) | • | 22 June 1815 | 7 July 1815 | Bonapartist | Napoleon II (1815) |

== See also ==
- History of France
- Ancien Régime
- Lord Chancellor of France
- Prime Minister of France
- List of prime ministers of France
