= Jean Frédéric Phélypeaux, Count of Maurepas =

French statesman (1701–1781)

The Count of Maurepas KOHS
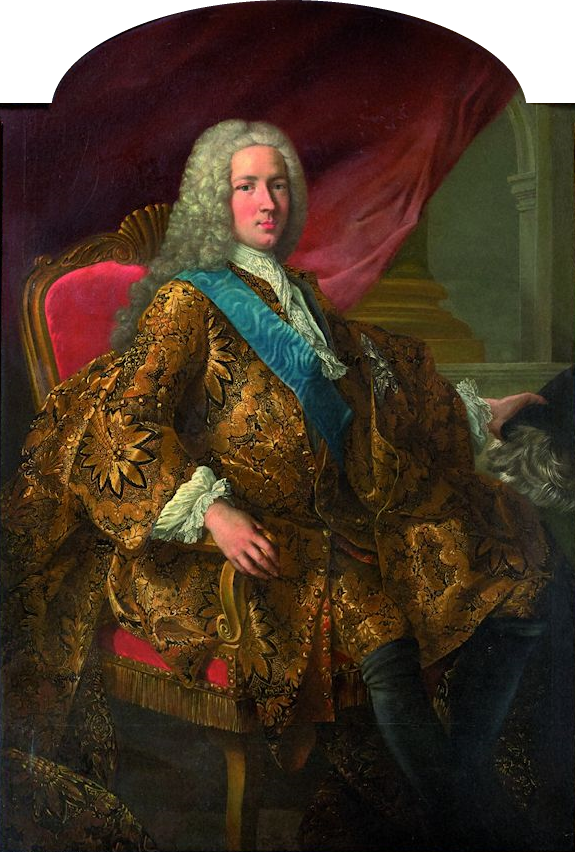
- Portrait of Maurepas by Louis-Michel van Loo (1733-1735)

First Minister of State
- In office 14 May 1776 – 21 November 1781
- Monarch: Louis XVI
- Preceded by: Jacques Turgot
- Succeeded by: Count of Vergennes

Secretary of State of the Navy
- In office 16 August 1723 – 23 April 1749
- Monarch: Louis XV
- Preceded by: The Count of Morville
- Succeeded by: The Count of Jouy

Secretary of State of the Maison du Roi
- In office 30 March 1718 – 20 April 1749
- Monarch: Louis XV
- Preceded by: Marquis of La Vrillière
- Succeeded by: The Count of Saint-Florentin

Personal details
- Born: Jean-Frédéric Phélypeaux; 9 July 1701 Versailles, Île-de-France, France
- Died: 21 November 1781 (aged 80) Versailles, Île-de-France, France
- Spouse: Marie-Jeanne Phélypeaux de La Vrillière (m. 1728–1781)
- Profession: Statesman

Jean Frédéric Phélypeaux, comte de Maurepas (9 July 1701 – 21 November 1781) was a French statesman under Louis XV and prime minister in the early years of the reign of Louis XVI.

== Biography ==
=== Early life and career ===
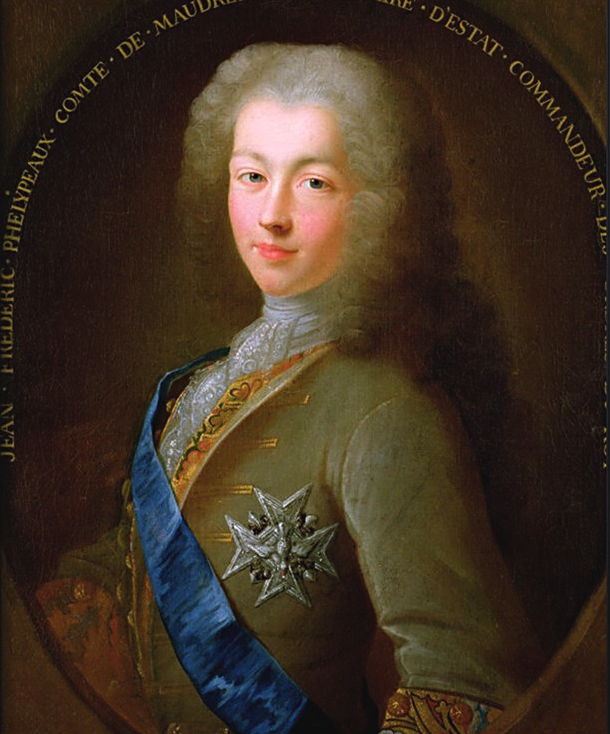
Portrait of a young Maurepas

He was born at Versailles, of a family of administrative nobility, the son of Jérôme Phélypeaux, secretary of state for the marine and the royal household. Under the guidance of his father, his grandfather and his cousin Louis Phélypeaux, marquis de La Vrillière, Jean-Frederic was trained from childhood to be secretary of state to the king of France. He had hereditary right to the position of secretary of state, under the Regent, Philippe II, Duke of Orléans, as his father Jerome had purchased the office with the right of inheritance.

In 1718 at the age of 17, Jean became the minister of the royal household and Comte de Maurepas under the guardianship of his cousin La Vrillière. Shortly after he married the daughter of his cousin, Marie-Jeanne Phélypeaux de La Vrillière (1704-1793). Five years later on 16 August he began his duties as minister of marine to Louis XV administering the navy, colonies and seaborne trade. In 1738 he was promoted to the Conseil du Roi, and in time contributed to significant political decisions. Maurepas continued his administrative career after the death of his guardian, and was minister of marine until 23 April 1749, when he was removed in a coup.

=== Ministerial Career ===
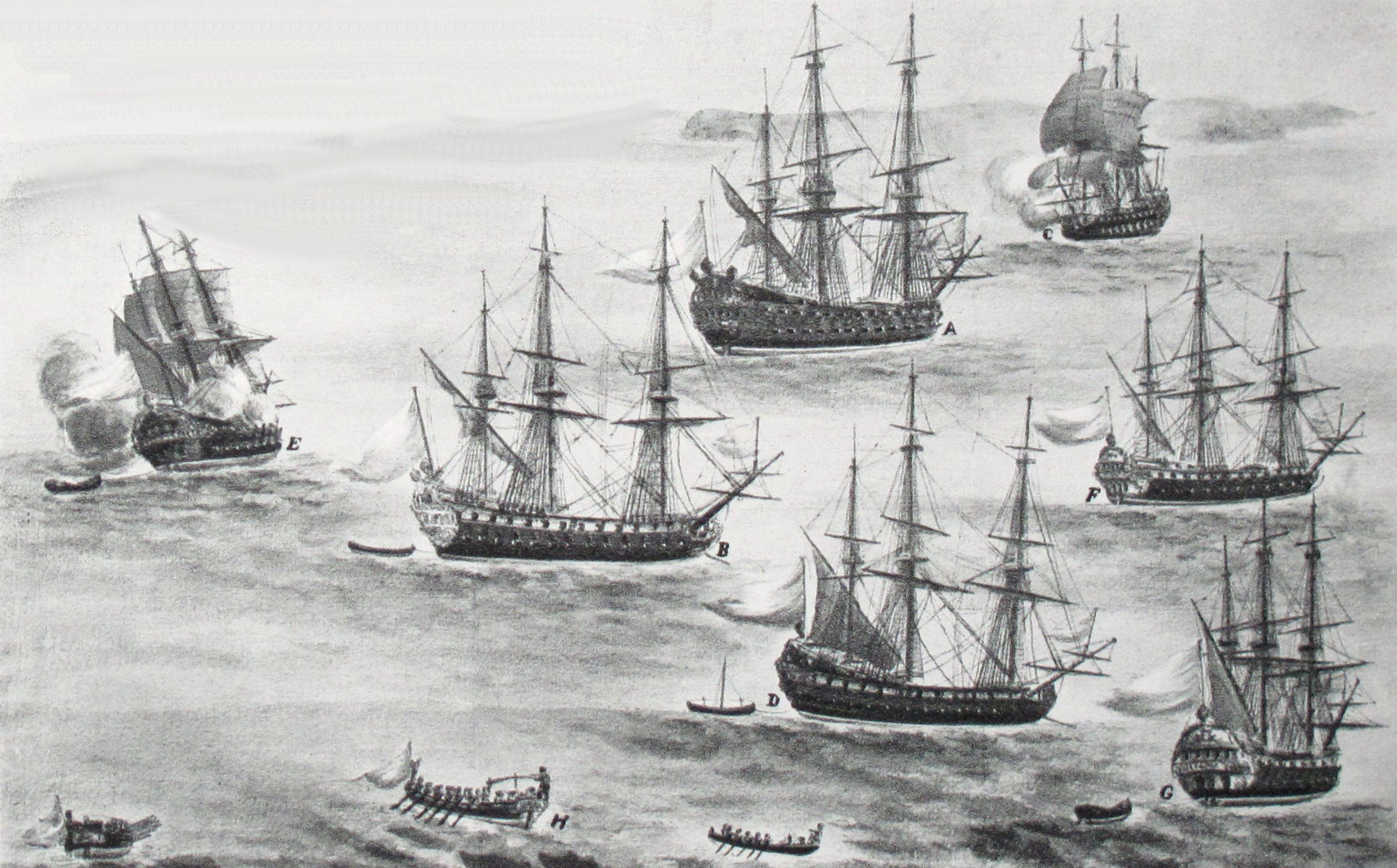
Naval parade organised by Maurepas

Skilled in military and naval strategy, Maurepas enabled the French Navy to regain previously lost prestige, and France was once again recognized as a maritime power. He focused on the defense of France's sprawling empire in the New World, especially in the 1730s and 1740s. His defense plans were aided by information on British naval manoeuvres, lists of what ships were coming to North America and detailed memoirs of ship construction. Maurepas obtained this information through maintaining an intelligence service that was considered one of the most efficient in Europe. This was only made possible due to the drastic funding increases he managed to obtain for the Troupes de la Marine. The typical budget appropriated to the marine from the mid-1720s to mid-1730s was 9 million livres; in 1739, however, Maurepas managed to obtain a budget of 19.2 million livres.

He acquired budgets of 20 million livres in 1740, 26 million in 1741 and 27 million in 1742. Over his career as administrator he held the positions of chamberlain of the royal household, minister of the marine, and director of the secret service, fulfilling his duties with efficiency and precision. In 1749, Maurepas was removed by a coup led by the duc de Richelieu, putting an end to his period of immense success. He was exiled from Versailles for an epigram against Madame de Pompadour, and went to Bourges and then onto Pontchartrain.

=== Later Career under Louis XVI ===
Maurepas was an important influence on Louis XVI during his childhood and the formative years of his reign. Despite his internal exile, Maurepas retained the confidence of the Dauphin, Louis XVI's father, and this enabled him to wield influence over the education of the future King, Louis-Auguste, then known as the duc de Berry. His choice of tutors for the prince led to the development of the scientific, particularly nautical, interests, that he later demonstrated as King. John Hardman argues that his role in the education of the prince was the key reason behind his appointment as chief minister when Louis acceded to the French throne.

In 1774, he was duly appointed minister of state to Louis XVI, as well as chief adviser in 1776, holding both positions until 1781. He gave Turgot the direction of finance, placed Lamoignon-Malesherbes over the royal household and made Vergennes minister for foreign affairs. In deference to popular clamour, at the outset of his administration he recalled the members of the old Parlement ousted by Maupeou, thus reconstituting the most dangerous enemy of royal power. This step, and his intervention on behalf of the American states, helped to pave the way for the French Revolution.

Jealous of his personal ascendancy over Louis XVI, he intrigued against Turgot, whose disgrace in 1776 was followed after six months of disorder by the appointment of Jacques Necker. In 1781 Maurepas deserted Necker as he had done Turgot, and shortly after being informed of the Franco-American victory at Yorktown and whilst suffering from an episode of gout, he died at Versailles on 21 November 1781. In what was called a 'high favour', Louis allowed Maurepas's body to remain at Versailles until his funeral on the 23rd.

=== Literary legacy ===
Maurepas is credited with contributions to the collection of facetiae known as the Etrennes de la Saint Jean (2nd ed., 1742). Four volumes of Memoires de Maurepas, purporting to be collected by his secretary and edited by J.L.G. Soulavie in 1792, included information on the North American colonies, the fall of Louisbourg, trade in the Caribbean, the censorship of books and administration. He also recorded extensive information on all naval matters including naval construction, navigation sailing instructions and fighting at sea. The collection of memoirs is now in the possession of Cornell University.

Lake Maurepas, Louisiana, USA was named for him, showing his surviving influence on the New World.

== See also ==
- Comte de Maurepas (ship)
- Maurepas, France
- Louis XVI
