= Conseil du roi =

King's Council

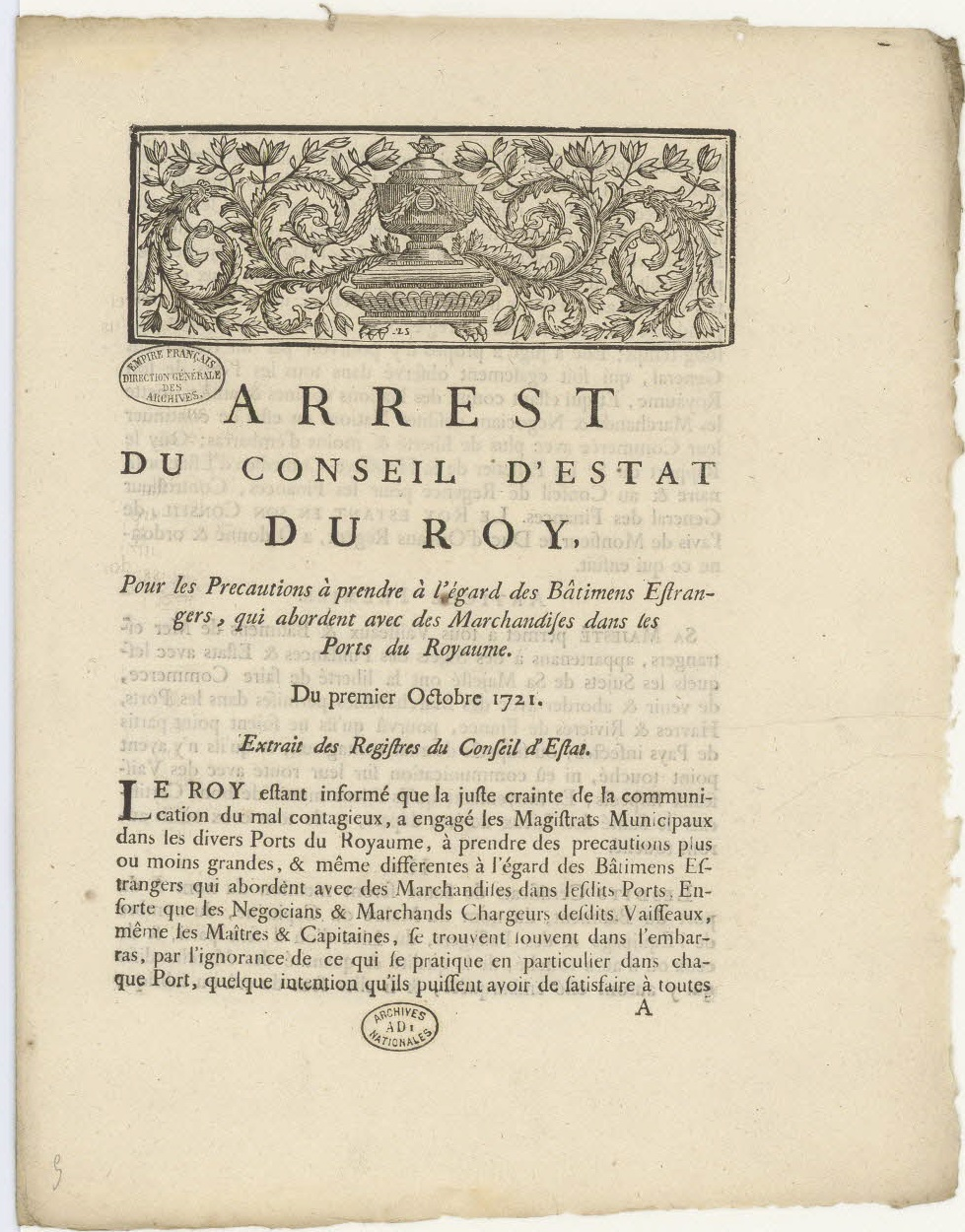
Order issued by the Conseil d'Estat du Roy ('King's Council of State') in 1721 pertaining to foreign vessels during the Great Plague of Marseille.

The Conseil du roi (French pronunciation: [kɔ̃sɛj dy ʁwa]; 'King's Council'), also known as the Royal Council, is a general term for the administrative and governmental apparatus around the King of France during the Ancien Régime designed to prepare his decisions and to advise him. It should not be confused with the role and title of a "Conseil du Roi", a type of public prosecutor in the French legal system at the same period.

One of the established principles of the French monarchy was that the king could not act without the advice of his council. Under Charles V, it was put forward that the king made decisions only after "good and careful deliberation" (French: bonne et mûre délibération), and this principle was maintained by his successors; the closing formula of royal acts "le roi en son conseil" expressed this deliberative aspect. Even during the period of French absolutism, the expression "car tel est notre bon plaisir" ("as such is our pleasure") applied to royal decisions made with consultation.

The administration of the French state in the early modern period went through a long evolution, as a truly administrative apparatus – relying on old nobility, newer chancellor nobility ("noblesse de robe") and administrative professionals – replaced the feudal clientele system. The exact divisions and names of these councils varied over time.

== Overview ==
=== Role ===
The kings of France traditionally always sought the advice of their entourage (vassals, clerics, etc.) before making important decisions (in the early Middle Ages, this entourage was sometimes called the familia), but only in the 12th century did this deliberation take the form of a specific institution called the King's Court (Latin: Curia Regis).

The council had only a consultational role: the final decision was always the king's. Although jurists frequently praised (especially in the 16th century) the advantages of consultative government (with the agreement of his counsellors, the king could more easily impose the most severe of his decisions, or he could have his most unpopular decisions blamed on his counsellors), mainstream legal opinion never held that the king was bound by the decisions of his council. The opposite was however put forward by the States General of 1355–1358, and by the Huguenots and by the Catholic League in the second half of the 16th century.

The council's purview concerned all matters pertaining to government and royal administration, both in times of war and of peace. In his council, the king received ambassadors, signed treaties, appointed administrators and gave them instructions (called, from the 12th century on, mandements), elaborated on the laws of the realm (called ordonnances). The council also served as a supreme court and rendered royal justice on those matters that the king reserved for himself (so-called "justice retenue") or decided to discuss personally.

Council meetings, initially irregular, took on a regular schedule which became daily from the middle of the 15th century.

In addition to the King's Council, the consultative governing of the country also depended on other intermittent and permanent institutions, such as the States General, the Parlements (local appellate courts) and the Provincial Estates. The Parliament of Paris – as indeed all of the sovereign courts of the realm – was itself born out of the King's Council: originally a consultative body of the Curia Regis, later (in the thirteenth century) endowed with judicial functions, the Parliament was separated from the King's Council in 1254.

=== Composition of the King's Council ===
The composition of the King's Council changed constantly over the centuries and according to the needs and desires of the king.

Medieval councils generally included:

- the crown prince (the "dauphin") – if he was of age to attend the council
- the "grands" – the most powerful members of the church and of the nobility.

Medieval councils frequently excluded:

- the queen (both as queen consort or as queen mother) – the queen lost direct political control as early as the 13th century, except in periods of regency; the queen thus attended only in extraordinary circumstances.
- close relations to the king, including younger sons, grandsons and princes of the royal bloodline (princes du sang) from junior branches of the family – these individuals were often suspected of harboring political ambitions.

The feudal aristocracy would maintain great control over the king's council up until the 14th and 15th centuries. The most important positions in the court were those of the Great Officers of the Crown of France, headed by the constable and the chancellor. Certain kings were unable to reduce their importance (Louis X, Philip VI, John II, Charles VI), while others were more successful (Charles V, Louis XI, Francis I). In the 16th century, those "grands" with administrative or governmental competencies (religious dignitaries, presidents of provincial courts, etc.) were called to the council by a special certificate (or "brevet") and were termed "conseillers à brevet".

Over the centuries, the number of jurists (or "légistes"), generally educated by the université de Paris, steadily increased as the technical aspects of the matters studied in the council mandated specialized counsellers. Coming from the lesser nobility or the bourgeoisie, these jurists (whose positions sometimes gave them or their heirs nobility, as the so-called noblesse de robe or chancellor nobles) helped in preparing and putting into legal form the king's decisions. They formed the early elements of a true civil service and royal administration which would – because of their permanence – provide a sense of stability and continuity to the royal council, despite its many reorganizations. These counsellors, called conseillers d'État from the reign of Henry III on, were aided in their tasks by the maître des requêtes.

In their attempts at greater efficiency, the kings tried to reduce the number of counsellors or to convoke "reduced councils". Charles V had a council of 12 members. Under Charles VIII and Louis XII the king's council was dominated by members of twenty or so noble or rich families. Under Francis I the total number of councillors increased to roughly 70 individuals (the old nobility was proportionally more important than in the previous century).

The most important matters of state were discussed in a smaller council of 6 or fewer members (3 members in 1535, 4 in 1554), while the larger council was consulted for judicial or financial affairs. Francis I was sometimes criticized for relying too heavily on a small number of advisors, while Henry II, Catherine de' Medici, and their sons found themselves frequently unable to negotiate between the opposing Guise and Montmorency families in their council. In periods of crisis, the number of members of the Council tended to increase: 100 councillors under Charles IX, during the worst moments of the Wars of Religion.

From 1661 to the French Revolution, royal administration was divided between the various sections of the King's Council (roughly 130 people) and a small group of ministers and secretaries of state. The royal governmental councils (see below) were the most important and were presided by the king personally. Despite popular opinion, the king did in fact listen to his counsellors and often adopted the opinion of the majority: according to Saint-Simon (whose distrust of Louis XIV makes this statement all the more believable), Louis XIV only went against the advice of his council six times.

== Royal Councils ==
Over time, the council began progressively to divide itself into separate subcouncils according to the affairs to be discussed. As early as the 13th century, one can distinguish a small council of a few members – the Conseil étroit ("narrow council") or Conseil secret – and a much larger council which came thus to be called the Grand Conseil.

Under Charles VII, a subcouncil appeared to handle particularly contentious judicial affairs. An ordinance by Charles VIII in 1497, and reaffirmed by Louis XII in 1498, removed this body from the king's council and established it as an autonomous court with the institutional name Grand Conseil. The Grand Conseil became thus a superior court of justice (that the king did not attend) with its own legal and judicial personnel and with a purview over contentious affairs submitted directly to the king (affairs of "justice retenue", or "justice reserved" for the king). This removal of the Grand Conseil from the council apparatus permitted the remaining sections of the council to focus on political and administrative affairs, but the need for further subsections continued.

Francis I created a Conseil des Affaires – a small informal group reuniting the chancellor, a secretary of commandments and several other close confidants – to deal with political and diplomatic issues, including war. The remaining large council (of 50–60 members) took the name of Conseil ordinaire ("Regular Council") or Conseil d'État ("Council of State"), but lost in its prestige, all the more so given that the king no longer regularly attended its sessions; in his absence the large council was presided by the chancellor.

Beginning in 1560, a separate council was created to handle financial affairs: the Conseil des finances; around 1600 this council was reunited with the state council as the Conseil d'État et des finances. Further sections followed for judicial affairs (the Conseil d'État privé or Conseil des parties) and for notices and administrative reports from the provinces (the Conseil des Dépêches); these are detailed below.

Despite these divisions into subcouncils, from a judicial point of view these various sections were all aspects of the same Council, and the decisions of the various sections were all considered to reflect the king's wishes. Even when the king was not in fact present as his councils, there were still considered to be presided over by him, and only the closing formula of their decisions changed: the expression "le Roi en son Conseil" was used when the king was not present at the meeting, the expression "le Roi étant en son Conseil" when he was.

The subcouncils of the King's Council can be generally grouped as "governmental councils", "financial councils" and "judicial and administrative councils". With the names and subdivisions of the 17th – 18th century, these subcouncils were:

Governmental Councils:

- Conseil d'en haut ("High Council", concerning the most important matters of state) – composed of the king, the crown prince (the "dauphin"), the chancellor, the contrôleur général des finances, and the secretary of state in charge of foreign affairs.
- Conseil des dépêches ("Council of Messages", concerning notices and administrative reports from the provinces)
- Conseil de Conscience ("Council of Conscience", concerning religious affairs and episcopal appointments)

Financial Councils:

- Conseil royal des finances ("Royal Council of Finances")
- Conseil royal de commerce

Judicial and Administrative Councils:

- Conseil d'État et des Finances or Conseil ordinaire des Finances
- Conseil privé or Conseil des parties or Conseil d'État ("Privy Council" or "Council of State", concerning the judicial system)
- Grande Direction des Finances
- Petite Direction des Finances

The King's Council also included various commissions and bureaus. In addition to the above administrative institutions, the king was also surrounded by an extensive personal and court retinue (royal family, valets, guards, honorific officers), regrouped under the name Maison du Roi.

At the death of Louis XIV, the Regent Philippe II, Duke of Orléans abandoned several of the above administrative structures, most notably the Secretaries of State, which were replaced by councils. This system of government, called the Polysynody, lasted from 1715 to 1718.

=== Governmental Councils ===
Governmental councils were always presided by the King in person. Decisions made in these councils were called arrêts en commandement.

These councils met in the King's Apartment, in a room called the Cabinet du Conseil (present in all royal residences). Members were informed of meeting times by the king and the cabinet bailiffs, and at the beginning of the session the doors of the cabinet were closed and were guarded from outside, to prevent any interruptions or spies, as the meetings were secret. The meetings took place around an oval table with the king at one end, seated in an armchair; all other members were seated on folding stools (these folding chairs were symbolic of the council's itinerant nature, as the council was held to follow the king wherever he went).

The king opened sessions by raising questions or by giving the floor to one of the members. Each member added to the discussion in the ascending order of their rank. Discussions concluded with a vote of the council's opinion (in the same ascending order; the vote was called "aller aux opinions"). In the end, the king made the final decision. Louis XV followed the same general rules but frequently interrupted discussion when it seemed to be going in a direction he disagreed with, rather than choose to go against the final opinion of the council. Meetings were typically longer than two hours and could go far longer.

==== Upper or State Council ====
Known variously as the Conseil des affaires, Conseil d'en haut ("Upper Council") or Conseil d'État ("State Council"), this was the most important of the royal councils and discussed the most important affairs of state. It was more or less the equivalent of today's Council of Ministers. The name Conseil d'en haut by which it was known from 1643 on (replacing the "Conseil des Affaires" of the 16th century) came from the fact that the council met in the "Cabinet of Council" on the second floor of the Château of Versailles next to the king's chamber.

Before the reign of Louis XIV, it was an extremely small council bringing together the first minister (when one existed), the chancellor, the superintendent of finances, one secretary of state and the ministers of state (counsellors appointed by the king). The council's purview was very large. At the beginning of Louis XIV's reign, the number of members was increased: in addition to the ministers of state, the council included members of the royal family, princes of the royal bloodline ("princes du sang") and dukes with peerage ("duc et pair").

From 1661 on, Louis XIV reorganized the council and eliminated the use of regular or open membership to its meetings. Henceforth, no one, not even the crown prince (the "dauphin"), could attend without an invitation, and attendance to the council meetings was given on a per-meeting basis with members needing to be reinvited to attend any subsequent meetings. The most frequent members of the council were the secretaries of state. In the beginning, Louis XIV admitted only three members regularly to the council (Michel le Tellier, Hugues de Lionne, Jean-Baptiste Colbert), and later increased this to five members. Louis XV increased it to 7 members and Louis XVI increased it to eight members.

During the reign of Louis XV, the council, commonly called the Conseil d'État, was generally focused on foreign affairs, naval and military affairs and, during times of war, military operations.

The council was held on Sundays and Wednesdays, but additional meetings were frequent, especially in times of war. In all, the council met on an average 120 to 130 times a year, and more in some years.

==== Council of Messages ====
The Conseil des Dépêches ("Council of Messages") oversaw the notices and administrative reports from the provinces sent by the governors and intendants, and thus dealt with domestic affairs coming under the purview of all four Secretaries of State. Created in 1650, it was originally presided by the Chancellor, but the King began to preside it himself from 1661 on. This council was made up of ten to twelve members: the first minister (when one existed), the crown prince, the chancellor, the ministers of state and the secretaries of state, the contrôleur général des finances. Other councillors of state or maîtres des requêtes attended according to the issues discussed.

The council met originally twice a week. Under Louis XIV, the schedule was slowed down, as the king had gotten into the habit of discussing these matters with his one-on-one meetings with his ministers; decisions taken were presented as "arrêts en commandement" even if they had not been officially deliberated in council.

Under Louis XV, the Conseil des Dépêches was very active and became, for domestic affairs, the equivalent of the Conseil d'En-haut for foreign affairs. The council met every Saturday, and sometimes on Friday, but also came together for additional meetings, some for several days in a row, as was the case during the Fronde parlementaire under Louis XV. In this way, the council met fifty times a year, and more than seventy times a year during periods of crisis.

==== Council of Conscience ====
The Conseil de Conscience was created in 1720 by the Regent Philippe II, Duke of Orléans to oversee implementation of the clauses of the papal bull Unigenitus. The council was kept after 1723 and met on Thursdays. Very busy until 1730, this council saw its influence decrease with the rise to power of Cardinal de Fleury, and the council disappeared finally in 1733. Presided by the king, it brought together the first minister (when one existed) and several cardinals and bishops, but no other ministers.

=== Financial councils ===
==== Council of Finances ====
The Conseil royal des finances was created by Louis XIV in September 1661 to help the king oversee the functions of Superintendent of Finances after the removal from power of Nicolas Fouquet. Before 1661, fiscal matters were treated in the Conseil de direction des finances, created in 1615, under Louis XIII.

The Council of Finances' purview was large; it dealt with the royal budget, taxation, industry, commerce, money, contracts to the Farmers General, etc. In this council, the overall size of the taille was set, and financial and taxation disputes were judged.

The council was made up of the king, the chef du conseil des finances (an honorary, but well-paid, post), the crown prince, occasionally the chancellor, the contrôleur général des finances and (generally) two of his counsellors, and the intendants of finance.

Until 1715, the council met twice a week. After this date, financial decisions were made by the king in one-on-one meetings with the contrôleur général des finances, and the council merely rubber-stamped their decisions without much debate. Under the Regent Philippe II, Duke of Orléans and then under Louis XV, the council met every Tuesday. From around 1728–1730, its rhythm slowed to less than once a week, and during the years 1730–1740, it met only once every two weeks.

==== Council of Commerce ====
The Conseil royal de commerce was created in 1664 as an equivalent to the Council of Finances, but it disappeared in 1676, and reappeared in 1730. This council was never fully able to stand out from the other councils and its influence was minor. In 1787, it was reunited with the Council of Finances.

=== Judicial and administrative councils ===
The divisions of the King's Council concerning contentious legal, administrative and judicial affairs were generally presided by the Chancellor of France, and the king himself rarely attended their meetings, although all acts of these councils were considered to derive from him and the chancellor was considered the "king's mouthpiece" (la bouche du Roi).

==== Conseil d'État et des finances ====
The Council of State and Finances (Conseil d'État et des finances or Conseil ordinaire des finances) was created in the beginning of the 17th century with various governmental oversight functions, including over financial matters. The council lost in its prestige during the reign of Louis XIII and ended as a supreme court for legal disputes concerning royal administration and appeals on decisions from sovereign courts concerning finances and taxation. The council had the same members as the Conseil privé (see below), but the contrôleur général des finances played a greater role.

The council began to fall out of use in 1665 and it disappeared entirely between 1680 and 1690. With the chancellor removed from the direction of financial affairs, Colbert was able to replace the maîtres des requêtes in the council by his own intendants of finances, and financial decisions were de facto decided in the collegial atmosphere at the Control General and in the Conseil des finances, thus dispensing of debates in the Conseil d'État et des finances.

By the late 17th century, the council's role as adjudicator in administrative disputes was subsumed by the Conseil d'État privé (see below).

==== Conseil privé or Conseil des parties ====
Known variously as the Conseil privé or Conseil d'État privé, or Conseil des parties, the Privy Council was the main body for decisions on France's judicial system, and as such it was roughly the equivalent of today's Conseil d'État.

It was first created in 1557. With the Grand Conseil being a completely autonomous court of justice separated from the king's council, the need was seen for certain judicial affairs to be discussed and judged within the king's council, especially those in which the impartiality of the courts was called into question. These special session trials gave rise to a new section of the king's council overseeing contentious issues, which took the name Conseil privé ("Privy Council") or Conseil des parties ("Council of Parties", i.e. the party in a legal suit). In theory, the king exercised justice in this council with his regular counsellors, but in fact the council was presided by the chancellor and was furnished with a corps of legal personnel (the five presidents of the Parlement of Paris, the maîtres des requêtes who brought affairs before the court, lawyers and prosecutors who represented the parties).

The main area of jurisdiction of the Conseil privé was civil trials between individuals (especially in cases involving the prestigious families and possible conflicts of interest among parlementary judges) and conflicts of judicial or administrative jurisdiction. Like the Grand Conseil, the Privy Council acted as a supreme court, pronounced judgements on the various sovereign courts of the realm (including the parlements and the Grand Conseil), and provided final judicial review and interpretation of law (the process of so-called évocation), oversight of the judicial corps, and judged disputes on royal offices, church benefices and problems between Catholics and Protestants.

Before the late 17th century, the Conseil privé was solely a judicial council, but at that time it took over affairs of administrative disputes from the "Conseil d'État et des finances" (which ceased to exist as such). This new council, called the Conseil d'État privé, finances et direction, was divided into three sections which met separately: the Conseil des parties, the Grande direction des finances and the Petite direction des finances.

The king rarely attended the Privy Council. Louis XIV came occasionally at the start of this reign, but Louis XV only attended two meetings (in 1762 and 1766). The king's empty armchair symbolized his presence. The council was presided by the chancellor seated to the right of the royal chair.

The council was the largest of the royal councils, and was composed of the chancellor, princes of the royal bloodline (princes du sang), dukes with peerage (ducs et pairs), the ministers and secretaries of state, the contrôleur général des finances, the 30 councillors of state, the 80 maître des requêtes and the intendants of finance. In general however, only the counsellors of state, the maîtres des requêtes and (at times) the intendants of finances attended regularly. Meetings were composed of generally 40 or so members, and rarely more than 60 members.

The Privy Council met on Mondays in a special room, the salle du Conseil which was outside the King's apartment. At Versailles, this room was on the ground floor of the "Old Wing" and gave out on to the Marble Courtyard (Cour de Marbre) and the Prince's Courtyard. Counsellors sat on armchairs of black leather, while the maîtres des requêtes remained standing. After each session, the chancellor dined with the counsellors (called "Messieurs du Conseil"). The Privy Council was on vacation from October to the feast of Saint Martin. It held roughly 40 to 45 sessions per year and issued 350 to 400 acts.

Before coming before a judicial session, affairs were submitted to the council by a maître des requêtes and studied by a group of state counsellors. Special offices were created according to the matters discussed (there was thus a bureau of ecclesiastical affairs) or the type of judicial action requested (there was a bureau of "cassation" or appeals). In the case of matters concerning the acts of sovereign courts, the council generally began by asking the parlementary prosecutor or judge who had written the lower court decision to first present his reasons before the council.

==== Grande and Petite Direction of Finances ====
These two regular commissions (commissions ordinaires) took over the purview of the Conseil d'État et des finances on fiscal legal disputes. They were composed of consellors of state and maîtres des requêtes. The Grand Direction was overseen by the chancellor and the Petite Direction by the chef du conseil des finances.

The Grande Direction was the direct successor to the Conseil de direction des finances (supra), but had a minor role and only met 6 to 12 times a year.

The Petite Direction consisted of roughly ten people and was created to prepare the work of the Grand Direction and to reduce its case load by judging the simplest of cases. It met irregularly, and disappeared around 1767.

=== Committee of ministers ===
Meetings of the King's Council were first planned by ministerial services, and then by the king with his secretaries and ministers. But for a time in the 18th century, agendas and meetings came to be planned in a committee called the "Committee of ministers", consisting of the members of the Conseil d'En-haut or of the Conseil des Dépêches meeting without the king. Although there had been antecedents of this committee during the reign of Louis XIV and the Regency, it became a regular institution in 1737 under the Cardinal de Fleury. These committees were held every Monday until the death of Cardinal Fleury.

Louis XV knew the risk of this committee, and in 1747 he mandated that the committee could not meet without his express permission, and generally to prepare decisions already decided on in council. In this way, meetings of the committee of ministers became far less frequent.

== Administrative personnel ==
Under Henry IV and Louis XIII the administrative apparatus of the court and its councils was expanded and the proportion of the "noblesse de robe" increased, culminating in the following positions during the 17th century:

- First Minister: ministers and secretaries of state – such as Sully, Concini (who was also governor of several provinces), Richelieu, Mazarin, Jean-Baptiste Colbert, Cardinal de Fleury, Turgot, etc. – exerted a powerful control over state administration in the 17th and 18th century. The title "principal ministre de l'état" was however only given six times in this period and Louis XIV himself refused to choose a "prime minister" after the death of Mazarin.
- Chancellor of France (also called the "garde des Scéaux", or "Keeper of the Seals")
- Controller-General of Finances (contrôleur général des finances, formerly called the surintendant des finances).
- Secretaries of State: created in 1547 by Henry II but of great importance after 1588, generally 4 in number, but occasionally 5:
  - Secretary of State for Foreign Affairs
  - Secretary of State for War, also oversaw the border provinces.
  - Secretary of State of the Navy
  - Secretary of State of the Maison du Roi (the king's royal entourage and personal military guard), who also oversaw the clergy, the affairs of Paris and the non-border provinces.
  - Secretary of State for Protestant Affairs (combined with the secretary of the Maison du Roi in 1749).
- Councillors of state (generally 30)
- Maître des requêtes (generally 80)
- Intendants of finances (6)
- Intendants of commerce (4 or 5)
- Ministers of State (variable)
- Treasurers
- Farmers-General
- Superintendent of the postal system
- Directeur général of buildings
- Directeur général of fortifications
- Lieutenant General of Police of Paris (in charge of public order in the capital)
- Archbishop of Paris
- Royal confessor

Royal administration in the provinces had been the role of the bailliages and sénéchaussées in the Middle Ages, but this declined in the early modern period, and by the end of the 18th century, the bailliages served only a judicial function. The main source of royal administrative power in the provinces in the 16th and early 17th centuries fell to the gouverneurs (who represented "the presence of the king in his province"), positions which had long been held by only the highest ranked families in the realm.

With the civil wars of the early modern period, the king increasing turned to more tractable and subservient emissaries, and this was the reason for the growth of the provincial intendants under Louis XIII and Louis XIV. Indendants were chosen from among the maître des requêtes. Intendants attached to a province had jurisdiction over finances, justice and policing.

== See also ==
- Fundamental laws of the Kingdom of France

== References and notes ==
- (in French) Bernard Barbiche, Les institutions françaises de la monarchie française à l'époque moderne, Paris, PUF, 1999.
- (in French) François Bluche, L'Ancien Régime. Institutions et société, Paris, Le livre de poche, coll. Références, 1993. ISBN 2-253-06423-8.
- (in French) Jean-Louis Harouel, Jean Barbey, Éric Bournazel, Jacqueline Thibaut-Payen, Histoire des institutions de l'époque franque à la Révolution, Paris, PUF, coll. Droit fondamental, 7th edition, 1996.
