= Louis Phélypeaux, Marquis of Phélypeaux =

French politician (1643–1727)

Louis Phélypeaux
- Marquis of Phélypeaux; Count of Maurepas, Count of Pontchartrain
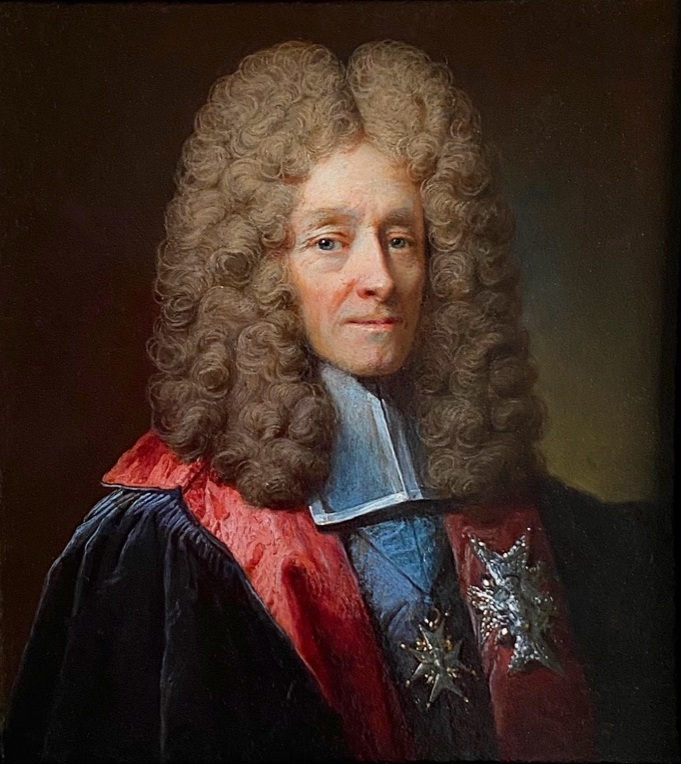
- Portrait by Robert Levrac-Tournières

Chancellor of France
- Reign: 5 September 1699 – 1 July 1714
- Predecessor: Louis Boucherat
- Successor: Daniel Voysin de la Noiraye

Secretary of State of the Navy
- Reign: 7 November 1690 – September 1699
- Predecessor: Jean-Baptiste Colbert de Seignelay
- Successor: Jérôme Phélypeaux de Pontchartrain

Secretary of State of the Maison du Roi
- Reign: 6 November 1690 – 5 September 1699
- Predecessor: Jean-Baptiste Colbert de Seignelay
- Successor: Jérôme Phélypeaux de Pontchartrain

Controller-General of Finances
- Reign: 6 November 1690 – 5 September 1699
- Predecessor: Claude Le Peletier
- Successor: Michel Chamillart

First President of the Parlement of Rennes
- Reign: 29 September 1689 – 5 September 1699
- Predecessor: François d'Argouges
- Successor: René Le Feuvre de La Faluère

President and Director of the East India Company
- Reign: 13 November 1690 – 27 December 1693
- Born: Louis Phélypeaux; 29 March 1643; Paris, Isle-de-France, Kingdom of France
- Died: 22 December 1727 (aged 84); Paris, Isle-de-France, Kingdom of France
- Issue: Jérôme Phélypeaux de Pontchartrain
- House: Pontchartrain Branch of the House of Phélypeaux
- Father: Louis Phélypeaux
- Mother: Marie de Maupeou
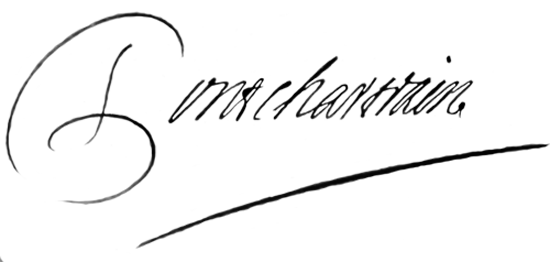
- Signature

Louis Phélypeaux, Marquis of Phélypeaux (French: [lwi felipo]; 29 March 1643 – 22 December 1727) was a French politician.

== Biography ==
Louis Phélypeaux was born on 29 March 1643 as son of Louis I Phélypeaux de Pontchartrain, and became an advisor to the Parlement of Paris by request on 11 September 1660. On 16 June 1677, he bought the post of First President of the Parlement of Rennes for the sum of 100,000 francs, replacing François d'Argouges, which was finalised on 27 August 1677. During revolts in the Duchy of Brittany, Phélypeaux was able to lead a peaceful resolution by helping the return of the Parliament to Rennes and meeting with revolters. On 25 April 1687, he was recalled to Paris at request of king Louis XIV to become Controller-General of Finances, which began his career as minister.

Between 29 September 1689 and 5 September 1699, Louis was Controller-General, but gained two more ministerial posts in 1690. From 6 November 1690 to 2 July 1714, Louis became Secretary of State of the Maison du Roi (Chief of the King's Household), and from 6 November 1690 to 5 September 1699 became Secretary of State of the Navy.

From 13 November 1690 to 27 December 1693, Louis became Perpetual Head, President, and Director of the East India Company.

== Career ==
He conducted a census of the population from 1693 onward, the first since Vauban's of 1678. At court he was an opponent of Fénelon and the Quietists.

Phélypeaux served as Chancellor of France from 5 September 1699 to 1 July 1714. Historian François Bluche wrote that "he gave the Chancellor's office an importance and authority not seen since the early years of Pierre Séguier." Saint-Simon greatly admired him, writing "There was never a man so quick of understanding, so cheerful and pleasant in conversation, so swift and confident in action, so sure in his judgment of other men, or so clever in outwitting them…his integrity was remarkable, apparent in everything that he did, and, underlying the lightheartedness that remained with him until the end, was much piety, kindness, and let me add, decency.” Pontchartrain was also Secretary of the Royal Households, his discretion was appreciated by Louis XIV.

He was made clerk of the prestigious Order of the Holy Spirit in May 1700.

He resigned in 1714 for having failed to affix the seals to the decree of 5 July 1714, condemning a document by the Bishop of Metz, Henri-Charles de Coislin, as contrary to the papal bull Unigenitus. He had found it difficult to reconcile his religious beliefs with those of the increasingly authoritarian Louis XIV. He retired to an Oratorian institution where he died in 1727.

== Personal life ==
In 1668 he married Marie de Maupeou. They had one son, Jérôme Phélypeaux (1674–1747), comte de Pontchartrain.

== Legacy ==
Coat of Arms of Phélyppeaux de Maurepas.

Lake Pontchartrain in Louisiana was named after him, as well as the historic Hotel Pontchartrain in New Orleans.

In Michigan his name was given to Fort Pontchartrain du Détroit (the site of modern-day Detroit), and to Detroit's Hotel Pontchartrain.

Isle Phelipeaux, Isle Pontchartrain, and Isle Maurepas, which appear on early maps of Lake Superior, were named in his honour by Pierre François Xavier de Charlevoix. It was later determined that Phelipeaux did not actually exist, and it is uncertain whether Pontchartrain and/or Maurepas refer to real islands known today by other names.

== See also ==
- Louis Phélypeaux (disambiguation)
- Phélypeaux
- Château de Pontchartrain
- Maurepas, Yvelines a city in France

== Bibliography ==
- Sara E. Chapman, Private Ambition and Political Alliances the Phélypeaux de Pontchartrain Family and Louis XIV's Government, 1650-1715. Rochester N.Y. : University of Rochester Press, 2004. ISBN 1580461530.

Political offices
Preceded by Jean-Baptiste Colbert, Marquis de Seignelay	Secretary of State for the Navy; 7 November 1683 – 6 September 1699	Succeeded by Jérôme Phélypeaux
