= Superintendent of Finances =

Finance minister of France from 1561 to 1661

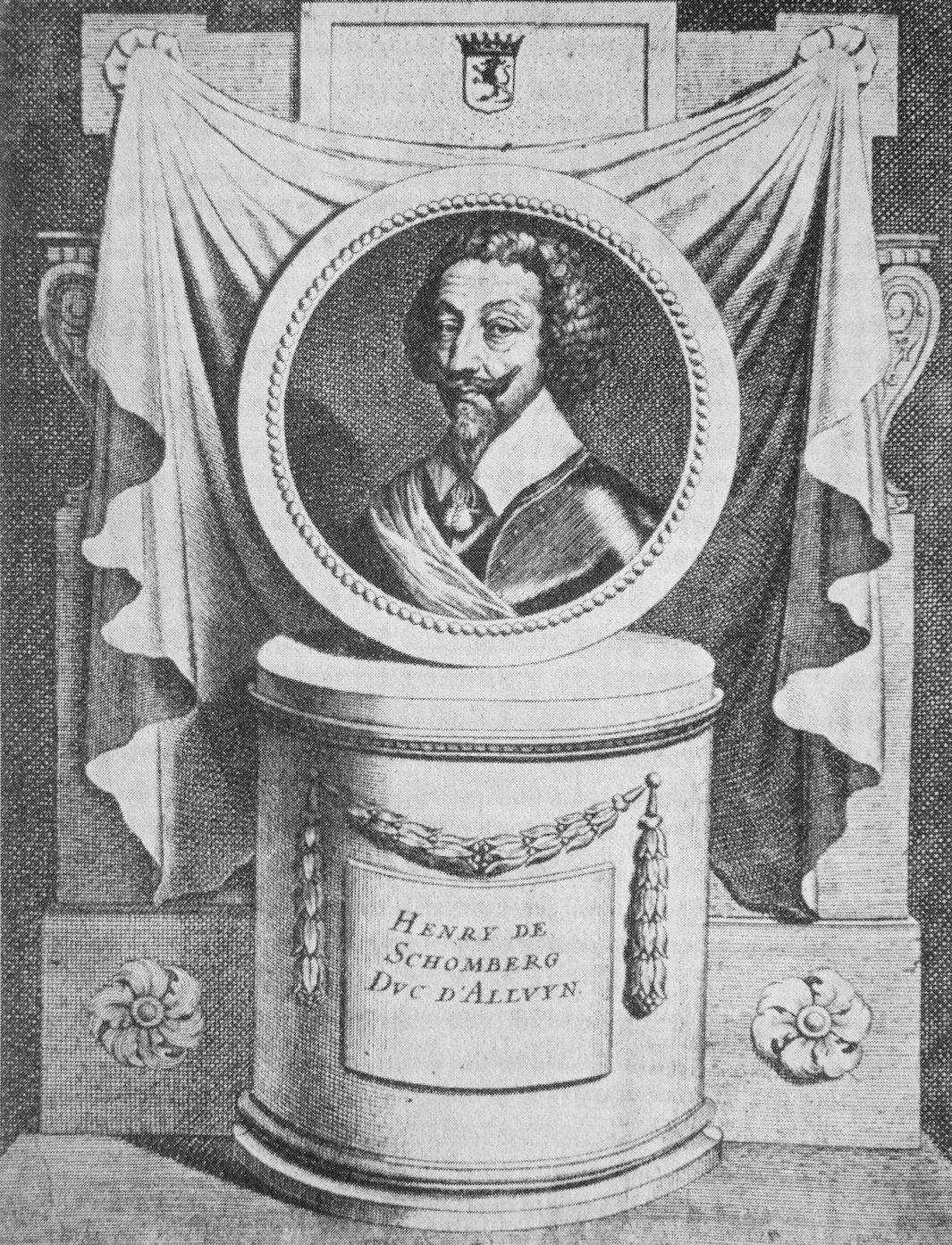
Henri de Schomberg (1575–1632) was Superintendent of Finances from 1619 to 1622.

The Superintendent of Finances (French: Surintendant des finances) was the name of the minister in charge of finances in France from 1561 to 1661. The position was abolished in 1661 with the downfall of Nicolas Fouquet, and a new position was created, the Controller-General of Finances.

== History ==
=== Before 1561 ===
Prior to the creation of the position "Surintendant des finances", France's royal financial administration had been run—from the time of Charles VII—by two financial boards which worked in a collegial manner: the four Généraux des finances oversaw the collection of taxes (taille, etc.) and the four Trésoriers de France (Treasurers) oversaw revenues from royal lands (the "domaine"). Together they were often referred to as "Messieurs des finances". The four members of each board were divided by geographical circumscriptions ("recettes générales" or "généralités"; the areas were named Languedoïl, Languedoc, Normandy, and Outre-Seine and Yonne), with the directors of the "Languedoïl" region typically having an honorific preeminence. The double-board was assisted in its work by four "contrôleurs généraux".

Before 1523–24, the King's Council had very little direct say on the day-to-day running of the double-boards. In 1523, Francis I, in an effort to exert a more direct control over royal finances during his European wars and to circumvent the double-board (accused of poor oversight)—created a separate Royal Treasury (Trésor de l'Épargne) directly under the control of the King's Council (analogous institutions had existed before), but the initial results were disappointing. From this moment through the next 40 years, numerous administrative reforms were attempted: increase in the number of "généralités"; unification of the tasks of the double-board into new positions (such as two "contrôleurs généraux" subservient to the Royal Treasurer); changes in the royal financial courts ("Cour des Comptes", "Cour des Aides"); creation of numerous provincial financial officers and boards; creation of the positions of "intendents" of finance (see below). With the increased role of the King's Council in financial matters, certain high-ranked nobles (like Anne de Montmorency or Charles of Lorraine, Cardinal of Guise) exerted a stronger advisory role over finances.

Although there was no official "Minister of Finances" in this period, certain individuals exerted an equivalent administrative role.

Under Francis I

- 1518–1524: Jacques de Beaune, baron de Semblançay
- 1524-1544: Philibert Babou
- 1544-1546: Jean Duthier
- 1546-1552: Claude d'Annebault

Under Henry II

- 1552: André Guillart
- 1556: Jean de Saint Marcel d'Avançon

=== Surintendant des finances ===
The position "Surintendant des finances" was officially created in 1561 during the reign of Charles IX, although some royal financial advisors had performed analogous duties previously. The position grew out of the positions of Intendants of Finances, officially created in 1552 by Henry II to oversee royal finances during the king's travels in Germany (he sought an alliance with Protestant Princes). At the time, three Intendants of Finances were named, and one of them would also participate in the Privy Counsel, thus the designation "superintendent". In 1561, the position fell to two individuals: Artus de Cossé-Brissac and the comte de Chaulnes. An administrative ruling on 23 October 1563 mandated once-a-week reunions of the Conseil du Roi (King's Counsel) to deal with financial questions of finances; to this meeting would come the superintendent of finances and other officers of country's financial administration, such as the Treasurer (trésorier de l'Épargne). In 1567, Cossé was promoted to maréchal de France; he resigned his post in favor of René de Birague (as did too, apparently, the comte de Chaulnes); René de Birague was thus the sole "superintendent".

In 1570, the position was assumed by the Conseil royal des finances. Henry III suppressed the Conseil royal des finances in 1574 and named a superintendent. Henry IV replaced the superintendent with a counsel. In this way, the position appeared intermittently, its fate tied to that of the Conseil des finances.

On 5 September 1661, Nicolas Fouquet was arrested for financial misdealings and brought to trial. On the 12th, the position of Supertintendant was replaced by a Conseil royal des finances, attended by an intendant, named the Contrôleur général des finances; this position first fell to Jean-Baptiste Colbert.

=== List of Surintendants des finances ===
- 1561–1567: Artus de Cossé-Brissac; Louis d' Ongnies, comte de Chaulnes
- 1568–1571: René de Birague
- 1574–1588: Pompone de Bellièvre
- 1588–1594: François d'O
- 1594–1597: A Council of 9 members: Pomponne de Bellièvre, Henri I de Montmorency, Albert de Gondi, Gaspard de Schomberg, Jacques de la Grange-le-Roy, Pierre Forget de Fresnes, Philippe Hurault de Cheverny and Nicolas de Harlay, sieur de Sancy
- 1597–1611: Maximilien de Béthune, duc de Sully
- 1611–1616: A Council of 3 members: Pierre Jeannin, Guillaume de L'Aubespin and Jacques Auguste de Thou
- 1616–1617: Claude Barbin
- 1617–1619: Pierre Jeannin
- 1619–1623: Henri de Schomberg
- 1623–1624:Charles de La Vieuville
- 1624–1626: A Council of 2 members: Jean de Bochart, Michel de Marillac
- 1626–1632: Antoine Coiffier de Ruzé, marquis d'Effiat
- 1632–1640: A Council of 2 members: Claude de Bullion, Claude Bouthilier
- 1640–1643: Claude Bouthilier
- 1643–1647: A Council of 3 members: Nicolas de Bailleuil; Claude de Mesmes; Michel Particelli d'Émery
- 1647–1648: Council of above without de Bailleuil
- 1648–1649: Charles de La Porte
- 1649–1650: Same council as earlier
- 1650–1651: René de Longueil
- 1651–1653: Charles de La Vieuville
- 1653–1659: A Council of 2 members: Nicolas Fouquet, Abel Servien
- 1659–1661: Nicolas Fouquet

== See also ==
- List of finance ministers of France
- Controller-General of Finances
- Secretary of State for Foreign Affairs (France)
- Secretary of State of the Navy (France)
- Secretary of State of the Maison du Roi
- Early Modern France
