= Louis Phélypeaux =

Louis Phélypeaux may refer to:

- Louis Phélypeaux, Seigneur of La Vrillière (1598–1681)
  - Louis Phélypeaux, Marquis of La Vrillière (1672–1725), his grandson
    - Louis Phélypeaux, comte de Saint-Florentin (1705–1777), his son
- Louis Phélypeaux, Marquis of Phélypeaux (1643–1727)

== See also ==
- House of Phélypeaux
