= Great Officers of the Crown of France =

Group of posts of duty in the Kingdom of France

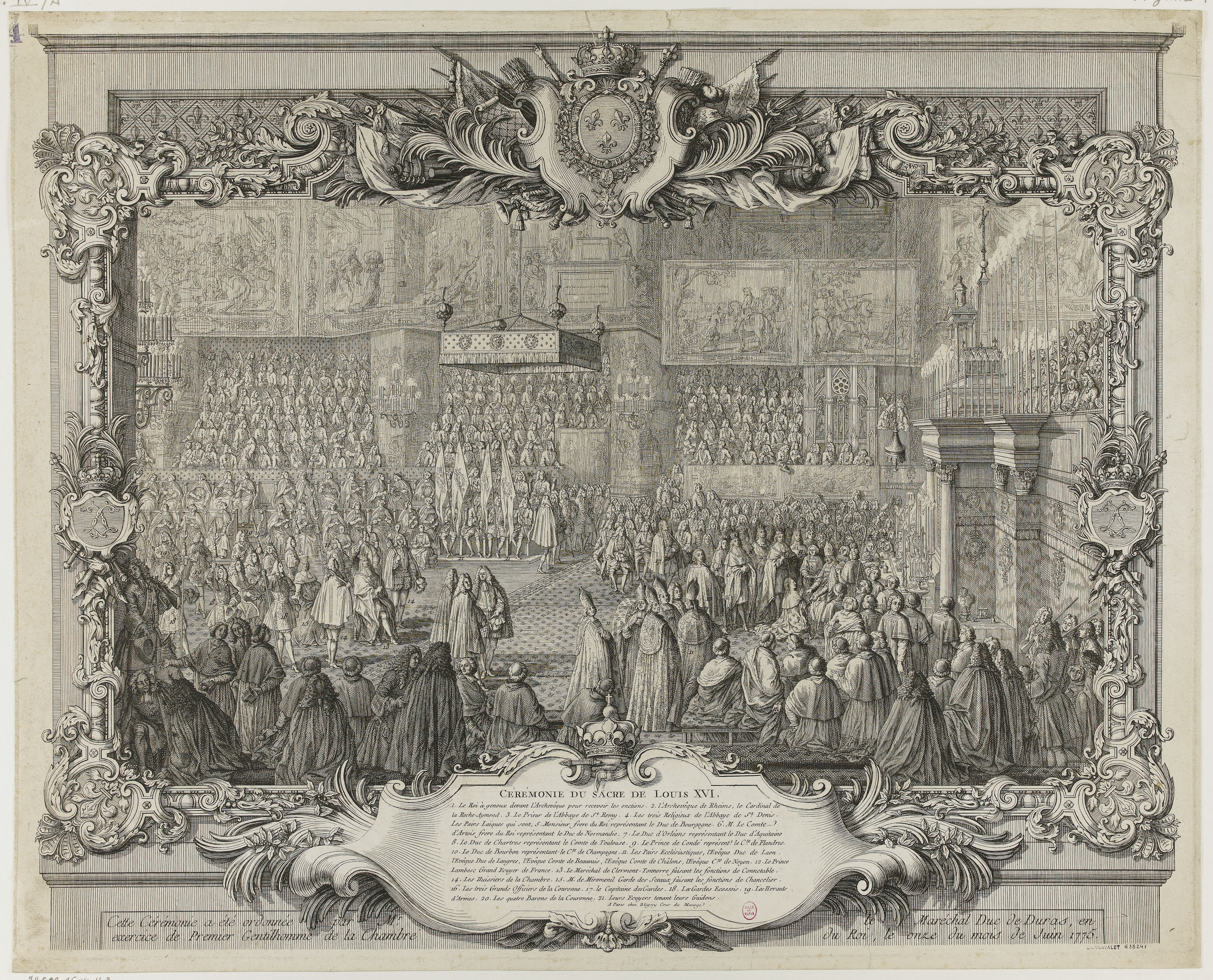
Depiction of the coronation of Louis XVI (1775). The three principal Great Officers of the Crown are circled and marked '16'; they were Henri Louis, Prince of Guéméné (Grand Chamberlain), Louis Joseph, Prince of Condé (Grand Master) and René Nicolas de Maupeou (Grand Chancellor).

The Great Officers of the Crown of France (French: Grands officiers de la couronne de France) were the most important officers of state in the French royal court during the Ancien Régime and Bourbon Restoration. They were appointed by the King of France, with all but the Keeper of the Seals being appointments for life. These positions were neither transmissible nor hereditary.

During the time of the First French Empire, the equivalent officers were known as the Grand Dignitaries of the French Empire. The Great Officers of the Crown of France should not be confused with the similarly named Great Officers of the Royal Household of France (Grands officiers de la maison du roi de France), which share certain officers, headed by the Grand Master of France.

== History ==
In 1224, Louis VIII legislated that the Great Officers participate, alongside the peers of France, in trials of members of the peers.

The military titles, such as Marshal of France, Grand Master of Artillery, and Colonel General, were offices granted to individuals and not military ranks.

== Great Officers of the Crown ==
In the hierarchical order established by Henry III in 1582, the Great Officers of the Crown of France were:

1. Constable of France (Connétable de France), the First Officer of the Crown and highest commander of the French army, until the position was suppressed in 1626.
2. Grand Chancellor of France (Grand Chancelier de France), promulgated royal decrees and was assisted in his tasks by the Keeper of the Seals.
3. Grand Master of France (Grand maître de France), similar to the position of Lord Steward, was head of the King's Household.
4. Grand Chamberlain of France (Grand chambellan de France), in charge of the king's chamber, with additional duties.
5. Admiral of France (Amiral de France), highest commander of the Navy.
6. Marshal of France (Maréchal de France) was a dignity bestowed only on to generals for exceptional achievements. The office alternated between being junior to and then senior to the Constable of France; after the suppression of the Constable, the Marshal of France became the de facto head of the army. The title Marshal General of the King's camps and armies (Maréchal général des camps et armées du roi), more commonly referred to as the Marshal General of France, was created superior to the Marshal of France to signify that the recipient had authority over all the French armies in the days when a Marshal of France governed only one army. This greater dignity was bestowed only on Marshals of France, usually when the dignity of Constable of France was unavailable or, after 1626, suppressed.
7. Grand Squire of France (Grand écuyer de France), similar to the position Master of the Horse, in charge of the king's stables.
8. Grand Master of Artillery (Grand maître de l'artillerie) was created a Great Office in 1601 by Henry IV, but later suppressed by Louis XV in 1755.

In the 17th and 18th centuries, the Secretaries of State were also included with the Great Offices:

- Secretary of State for Foreign Affairs
- Secretary of State for War
- Secretary of State of the Navy
- Secretary of State of the Maison du Roi, who also oversaw the clergy, and the affairs of Paris.
- Secretary of State for Protestant Affairs

== Other officers ==
In addition to the aforementioned Great Officers of the Crown there were several positions of importance that have been considered de facto Great Officers by scholars, and other offices that were created to carry out specific functions of the Great Officers whose list of responsibilities became too cumbersome to perform alone and those offices that acted as direct subordinates to the Great Officers.

- Keeper of the Seals (Garde des Sceaux), assistant to the Chancellor.
- Grand Almoner of France (Grand aumônier de France) was charged with keeping the royal chapel.
- Colonels General were officers ranking immediately below the Marshals of France. The first office was created by Francis I, and by the end of the Ancien Régime included the offices of Colonel General of the Infantry, Colonel General of the Cavalry, Colonel General of the Dragoons, Colonel General of the Hussards, Colonel General of the Cent-Suisses & Grisons and Colonel General of the Gardes Françaises.
- Lieutenant-General of the Realm, a governor and military representative of the king, who oversees all royal business in a province and reports directly to the king.
- Grand Master of Ceremonies

The 17th century genealogist Père Anselme also included the following as Great Officers:

- Porte Oriflamme, standard-bearer of the Oriflamme (Royal Standard) in battle.

Insignia of the dignity of General of the Galleys

- General of the Galleys ("Général des Galères"), military position in charge of the galleys.
- Great Hunter of France (Grand Veneur de France), the master of the hunt and royal Game Warden.
- Grand Falconer of France (Grand Fauconnier), master of the falcon hunt and hunting lodges.
- Grand Louvetier of France, master of the wolf hunt
- Great Cupbearer (Grand Échanson), the royal cup-bearer.
- Great Master of the Waters and Forests (Grand Maitre des Eaux et des Forêts), in charge of rivers and forests.

The following offices from the Medieval court are generally considered a posteriori Great Offices, even though the expression, as such, did not exist at the time:

- Grand Seneschal of France (Grand Sénéchal de France), head of the king's armies and of the royal household, position suppressed in 1191.
- Grand Chamberman of France (Grand chambrier de France), head of the King's chamber, position suppressed in 1545.
- Grand Butler of France (Grand Bouteiller), master of ceremonies, judgements of nobility, royal table and wine cellars.
- Grand Master Crossbowman (Maître des Arbalétriers) – position subsumed by the Grand Master of Artillery.
- Great Bread Master of France (Grand Panetier of France), in charge of the royal bakeries, also supervises the city bakeries.
- Grand Queux, the royal cook.

== See also ==
- Grand Dignitaries of the French Empire
- Great Officer of State

== Sources and external links ==
- French heraldry site (in French)
- Les officiers de la Maison du Roi et le cérémonial public de Henri III à Louis XVI
