= House of Phélypeaux =

Coat of arms of the Phélypeaux family

The Phélypeaux family (French pronunciation: [felipo]) is a French noble family from Blésois region (around Blois), whose members held significant political positions during the Kingdom of France.

== Branches ==
Its two principal branches were those of the lords of Herbault, La Vrillière, and Saint Florentin, and of the counts of Pontchartrain and Maurepas. The family produced a number of individuals who played an important role in royal administration during the Ancien Régime.

== Pontchartrain-Maurepas branch ==
- Paul Phélypeaux (1569–1621), founder of the branch of Pontchartrain-Maurepas, brother of Raimond Phélypeaux (see below); he became secretary of state in 1610. Secretary of State for Protestant Affairs
- Louis I Phélypeaux de Pontchartrain, son of previous
- Louis II Phélypeaux (1643–1727), son of previous, marquis de Phélypeaux (1667), comte de Maurepas (1687), comte de Pontchartrain (1699), known as the chancellor de Pontchartrain, was a French politician. Secretary of State of the Navy (France), Secretary of State of the Maison du Roi, Controller-General of Finances, Chancellor of France.
- Jérôme Phélypeaux (1674–1747), comte de Pontchartrain, son of previous. Secretary of State of the Navy (France), Secretary of State of the Maison du Roi
- Jean-Frédéric Phélypeaux, comte de Maurepas (1701–1781), son of previous. Secretary of State of the Maison du Roi

== La Vrillière branch ==
- Raymond Phélypeaux, seigneur of Herbault and La Vrilliere (d. 1629), was treasurer of the Épargne in 1599, and became minister of state in 1621, and Secretary of State for Foreign Affairs (France).
- Louis Phélypeaux (1598–1681), son of the previous; minister of state, and Secretary of State for Protestant Affairs.
- Balthazar Phélypeaux, marquis de Chateauneuf (1638–1700), son of the previous; minister of state and Secretary of State for Protestant Affairs.
- Louis Phélypeaux, Marquis of La Vrillière (1672–1725), son of the previous; minister of state and Secretary of State for Protestant Affairs.
- Louis Phelypeaux (1705–1777), son of the previous, count of Saint Florentin and afterwards duke of La Vrilliere (1770), succeeded his father as secretary of state. Secretary of State for Protestant Affairs, Secretary of State of the Maison du Roi.
- Raimond Balthazar Phélypeaux, seigneur du Verger, a member of the La Vrilliere branch, was sent as ambassador to Savoy in 1700, where he discovered the intrigues of the duke of Savoy, Victor Amadeus II, against France; and when war was declared he was kept a close prisoner by the duke (1703–1704). At the time of his death (1713) he was governor-general in the West Indies.

== See also ==
- Ancien Régime in France
- Secretary of State of the Maison du Roi
- Secretary of State for Foreign Affairs (France)
- Secretary of State for War (France)
- Secretary of State of the Navy (France)
- Secretary of State for Protestant Affairs
- Paul II Ardier
