= Ministers' Wings =

Part of the Palace of Versailles in France

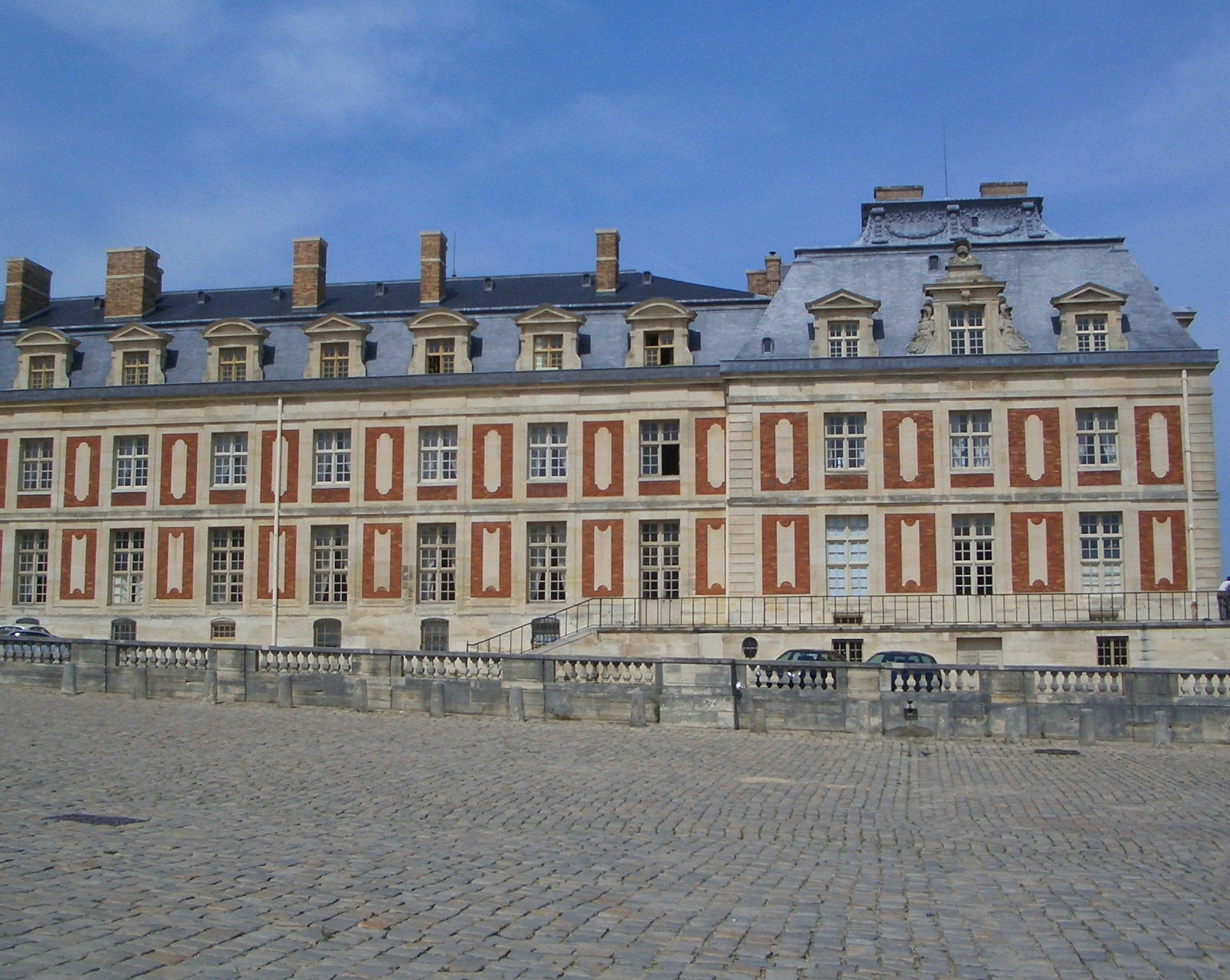
The northern Ministers' Wing in the Cour d'Honneur at the Palace of Versailles (2011).

The Ministers' wings are outbuildings of the Palace of Versailles located in the Cour d'Honneur; the south wing now houses the Princes' bookshop and the ticket office, while the north wing is used to welcome groups of visitors.

== History ==
Four pavilions were built for the Secretaries of State in 1671. Jules Hardouin-Mansart had the Ministers' wings built on the basis of these pavilions in 1679. The soberly ornamented Ministers' Wings, attached to the château, mark the end of the era of all-powerful ministers such as Fouquet, who defied the king with the construction of his château at Vaux-le-Vicomte. Each of the four secretaries of state occupied half a wing, and had access to all floors. The ground floor was devoted to work and reception areas, the second floor housed their apartments, their families were accommodated on the third floor, and the attic was used for clerks.

The two pavilions overlooking the Place d'Armes, at the end of the Ministers' wings, served under the Ancien Régime as guardhouses for the French and Swiss Guards, responsible for the castle's external protection. The French Guards occupied the end of the south wing, while the Swiss Guards occupied the north pavilion. Their officers had bedrooms on the upper floor of the guardhouse; they also had their own dining room and an "assembly room", where they could play tric-trac.

From 1958 onwards, the Ministers' wings housed the official residences and reception rooms for the presidents of the assemblies and the quaestors. The premises were returned to the Palace of Versailles in 2005 at the suggestion of National Assembly President Jean-Louis Debré.

The northern ministers' wing houses the lecturers' entrance and the school locker room, while the southern ministers' wing houses the princes' bookshop and the château's ticket office.
