= Secretary of State for Foreign Affairs =

Secretary of State for Foreign Affairs may refer to:

- Secretary of State for Foreign Affairs (Spain)
- Secretary of State for Foreign Affairs (UK) (1782–1968)
- Secretary of State for Foreign Affairs (France) during the Ancien Régime
- Secretary of State for Foreign Affairs (Germany)
