= Pierre Forget de Fresnes =

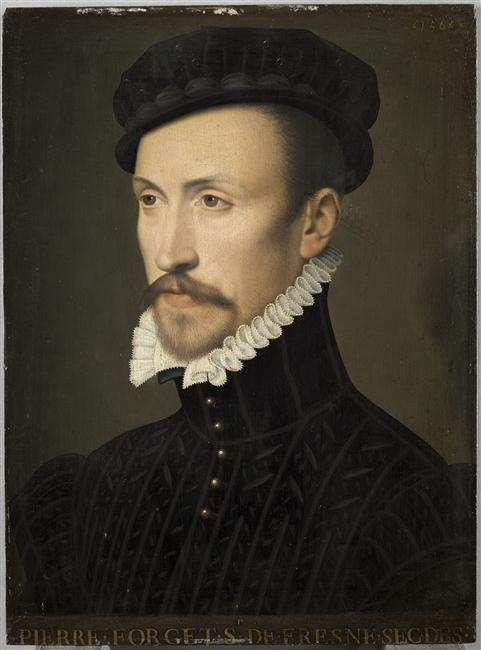
- Portrait by the workshop of François Clouet

Secretary of State for Protestant Affairs
- In office 22 February 1588 – 21 April 1610
- Preceded by: Inaugural holder
- Succeeded by: Paul Phélypeaux

Superintendent of Finances
- In office 1593–1597 Serving with Pomponne de Bellièvre, Henri I de Montmorency, Albert de Gondi, Gaspard de Schomberg, Jacques de la Grange-le-Roy, Philippe Hurault de Cheverny, Nicolas de Harlay
- Preceded by: François d'O
- Succeeded by: Maximilien de Béthune

French Ambassador to Spain
- In office 1589–1589
- Preceded by: Pierre de Ségusson
- Succeeded by: Nicolas Brûlart de Sillery

Personal details
- Born: c. 1544
- Died: 1610 (aged 65–66)
- Spouse: Anne de Beauvilliers
- Parent(s): Pierre Forget; Françoise de Fortia

Pierre Forget de Fresnes (c. 1544 – 1610), Baron of Véretz and Fau, Lord of Fresnes (acquired in 1594) and of La Ferté-Hubert, was a French nobleman and close associate of Henry IV. A diplomat, Forget is best known today as one of the principal drafters of the Edict of Nantes.

== Early life ==
Pierre was born in c. 1544 into the nobility of Touraine. He was the second son of the Chevalier Pierre Forget, Lord of Bouchet and La Branchoire, and Françoise de Fortia.

== Career ==
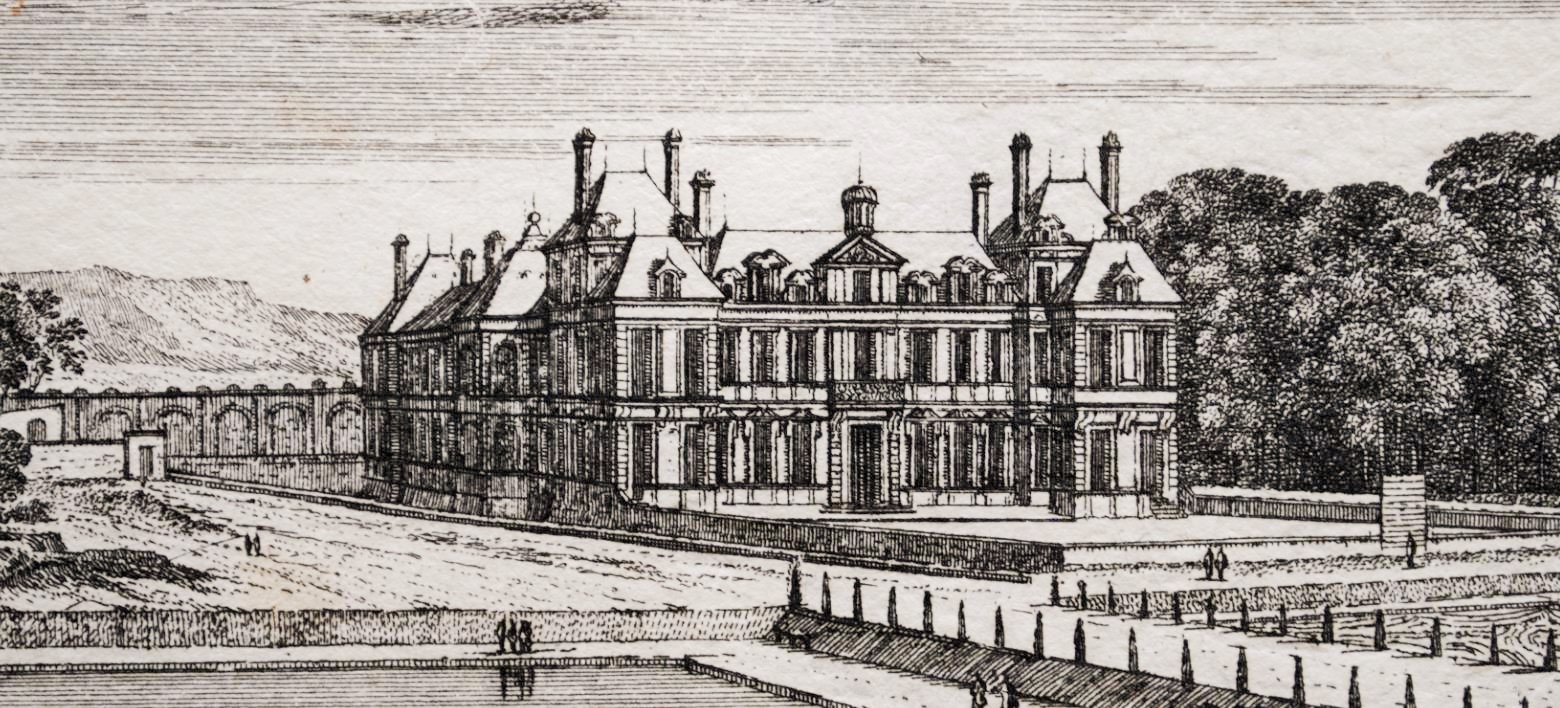
Engraving of the Château de Fresnes

Forget was Lord of Fresnes-sur-Marne, Baron of Véretz and of Fau (in Reignac-sur-Indre). He served, successively, as the First Secretary of the Chamber and Receiver of the King's Stables (secrétaire de la chambre et receveur des écuries du roi), Royal Treasurer responsible for receiving payment for venal offices (trésorier des parties casuelles) in 1576, Grand Audiencier of France and Secretary of Finances in 1577, Secretary of Finance to Henry of Navarre in 1576 (the future Henry IV; and his agent at the Court of France), Ambassador to Spain in 1589, Intendant General of the King's Buildings (intendant général de Bâtiments du Roi), Secretary of State for Protestant Affairs on 22 February 1589 (and Secretary of the King's Commands; secrétaire des commandements du roi), which he resigned from on 21 April 1610, shortly before his death.

In 1594, he acquired the Lordship of Fresnes from François d'O, where he built the Château de Fresnes. At the château, he drafted his famous Edict which was signed in Nantes in 1598. The estate eventually passed to his wife's family, and was inherited by her nephew, François de Beauvilliers, 1st Duke of Saint-Aignan, who sold it to Henri du Plessis-Guénégaud in 1641.

=== Edict of Nantes ===
He was appointed, as the King's Catholic advisor, with Daniel Chamier, a Huguenot minister who represented the other side, to negotiate and draft the Edict of Nantes on 28 February 1593.

== Personal life ==
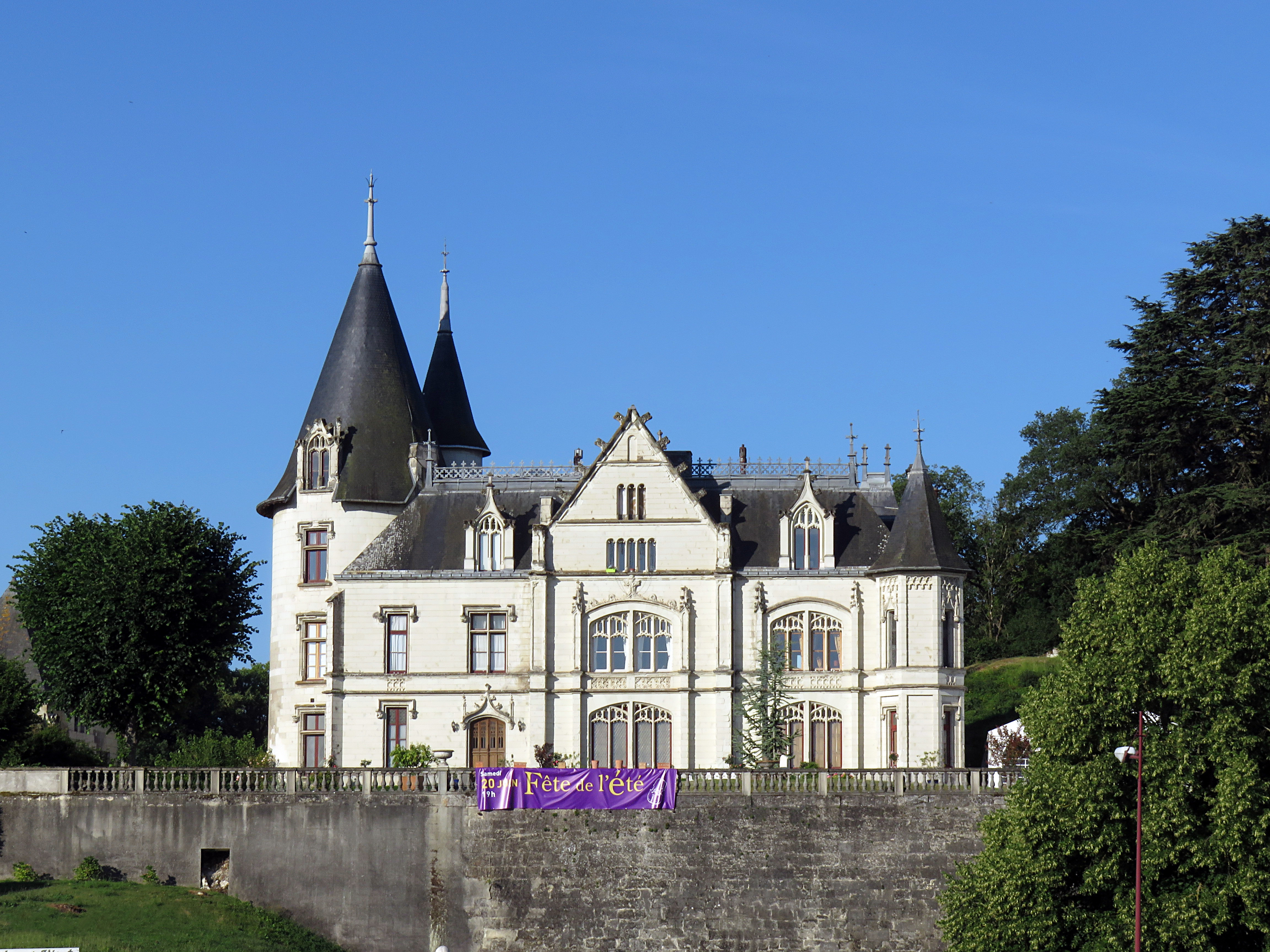
Château de Véretz

On 28 February 1593, Forget was married to Anne de Beauvilliers de Saint-Aignan (1566–1636), Lady of La Ferté-Hubert (at Chantenay-Saint-Imbert), a daughter of Claude II de Beauvilliers, the Count of Saint-Aignan and of Marie Babou de la Bourdaisière (daughter of Jean Babou, sister of Françoise Babou de La Bourdaisière, and aunt of Cardinal François de Sourdis). Her father was Governor and Lieutenant-General of Berry, Anjou and the City of Bourges. (Note: Anne's father, Claude II de Beauvilliers (1542–1583), was the nephew, namesake, of Claude de Beauvilliers, the Count of Saint-Aignan, who was the first husband of Claude de Rohan-Gié.) Among her siblings were Honorat de Beauvilliers (father of François de Beauvilliers, 1st Duke of Saint-Aignan) and the abbesses Claude de Beauvilliers and Marie de Beauvilliers, who became one of the many mistresses of King Henry IV, when he lodged at the Montmartre Abbey while laying siege to Paris in 1590. Together, they were the parents of:

- Pierre Forget (1600–1681), a licentiate in law, he was Seneschal of Nouâtre and Comptroller Ordinary (contrôleur ordinaire) of the stables of His Highness the Prince of Condé; he married Françoise de Villeret, a daughter of Guillaume de Villeret, Sieur de Bessay.

He was an intimate friend of Guy Du Faur, Seigneur de Pibrac, who dedicated Vita to him.

Following his death in 1610, he was buried at Montmartre Abbey, where his sister-in-law was Abbess.
