= Secretary of State (ancien régime) =

Secretary of State was the name of several official governmental positions – supervising war, foreign affairs, the navy, the king's household, the clergy, Paris, and Protestant affairs – in the Kingdom of France during the Ancien Régime, roughly equivalent to the positions of government ministers today. The positions were created in 1547, but they gained in importance only after 1588. The various secretaries of state were considered part of the Great Officers of the Crown of France.

== History ==
Secretaries of State first appeared in 1547 under the reign of Henry II, but only gained in importance from 1588 on. The various secretaries of state were from that point on considered part of the Great Officers of the Crown of France.

At their creation, there were four secretaries of state, but at various times in their history there appeared five. Under Louis XV there were five secretaries in September 1718 (at the death of Guillaume Dubois) and again from 1763 to 1780, when fifth department was created for Henri Léonard Jean Baptiste Bertin dealing with financial affairs.

At the death of Louis XIV, the Regent Philippe II, Duke of Orléans suppressed the secretaries of state, relying instead on a collegial system of government, called the Polysynody, which lasted from 1715-1718. Instead of secretaries, their duties were handled by a Council of State, composed of various subcouncils of war, foreign affairs, the navy, etc. The slowness of this system proved ineffective, and the secretaries of state were brought back.

== Organization ==
Each secretary of state was the head of a specialized department of state with a functional area of expertise (War, Foreign Affairs, the Navy, the Maison du Roi, Protestant Affairs) and a geographical area of expertise (several provinces). The secretaries gave counsel to the king, and countersigned (or co-signed) and expedited royal decisions (edicts and declarations).

The secretaries of state were members of the king's "Conseil privé", but rarely attended its sessions. The secretaries of war and of foreign affairs attended the "Conseil royal de commerce". All secretaries of state were members of the "Conseil des Dépêches". For more on these councils, see the article Conseil du Roi.

The secretary of state for foreign affairs was traditionally named by the honorific title "ministre d'État" upon assuming his position. The other secretaries usually gained this title over time.

The secretaries of state were appointed by the king and their positions were revocable. Nevertheless, their offices required purchase (between 500,000 and 900,000 livres), and this fee usually included a certificate, or "brevet de retenue", permitting reimbursement in the case of demission.

== Positions ==
There were generally four, sometimes five, secretaries of state:

- Secretary of State for Foreign Affairs
- Secretary of State for War
- Secretary of State of the Navy
- Secretary of State of the Maison du Roi (the "Maison du Roi" was the king's royal entourage and personal military guard), who also oversaw the clergy, the affairs of Paris, and the king's buildings.
- Secretary of State for Protestant Affairs (combined with the secretary of the Maison du Roi in 1749).

The positions of Secretary of State of Foreign Affairs and of War were constant, but the attributes and number of the other secretaries varied over time.

There was no Secretary of the Interior, as the secretaries of state divided administration of the provinces between themselves:

- the Secretary of State for War oversaw border provinces.
- the Secretary of State of the Maison du Roi oversaw provinces that had provincial estates, or "pays d'états" (see taille) and, from 1747 on, the other internal provinces of France (after several Secretaries of State for Foreign Affairs had refused to take on administration of provinces).
- the Secretary of State of the Navy oversaw colonies, except between 1749 and 1754.

There was no secretary of state of justice (this was fulfilled by the Chancellor of France) nor of Finances (overseen by the position of Controller-General of Finances).

== See also ==
- Conseil du Roi
- Early Modern France
