= Louis Phélypeaux, comte de Saint-Florentin =

French politician (1705–1777)

Most High and Most Potent Lord The Duke of La Vrillière
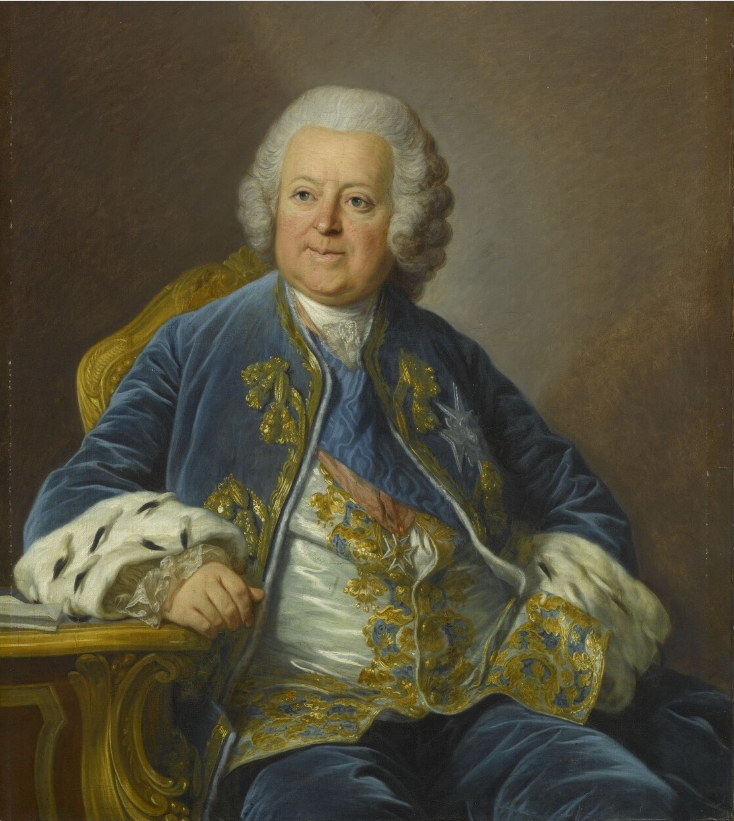
- Portrait by Louis-Michel van Loo

Secretary of State of the Maison du Roi
- In office 1749 – 1775
- Monarchs: Louis XV (to 1774); Louis XVI (from 1774)
- Preceded by: Jean-Frédéric Phélypeaux
- Succeeded by: Guillaume-Chrétien de Lamoignon de Malesherbes

Minister for Foreign Affairs
- In office 24 December 1770 – 6 June 1771
- Monarch: Louis XV
- Preceded by: Étienne François de Choiseul
- Succeeded by: Emmanuel-Armand de Richelieu

Acting Secretary of State for War
- In office 24 December 1770 – 4 January 1771
- Monarch: Louis XV
- Preceded by: Étienne François de Choiseul
- Succeeded by: Louis François de Monteynard

Personal details
- Born: 18 August 1705 Paris, Kingdom of France
- Died: 27 February 1777 (aged 71) Paris, Kingdom of France

Louis Phélypeaux (French: [lwi felipo]; 18 August 1705 – 27 February 1777) Count of Saint-Florentin, Marquis (1725) and Duke of La Vrillière (1770), was a French politician.

== Biography ==
Born 18 August 1705, in Paris, to Louis Phélypeaux, Marquis de La Vrillière, and Françoise de Mailly-Nesle (1688–1742), he succeeded his father as Secretary of State for Protestant Affairs, with responsibility for Huguenots. Appointed minister for the Department of the Maison du Roi by Louis XV in 1749, he held the post until 1775, setting a record for ministerial service. He was named to the Order of the Holy Spirit, where he served as chancellor. After the dismissal of Choiseul in December 1770, he served as Foreign Minister until June 1771. His use of lettres de cachet in the La Chalotais case was controversial and he resigned his ministerial posts in 1775. He died on 27 February 1777, aged 71, in Paris

In 1724, he married Amélie Ernestine de Platen (d. 1752). He had Chalgrin design the Hôtel de Saint-Florentin. This later passed to Talleyrand and to James Mayer de Rothschild, and is now part of the American Embassy, Paris.
