= Secretary of State of the Maison du Roi =

Position in the Ancien Régime and Bourbon Restoration

The secretary of state of the Maison du Roi (French: Secrétaire d'État à la Maison du Roi) was the secretary of state in France during the Ancien Régime and Bourbon Restoration in charge of the Département de la Maison du Roi. The exact composition of the ministry and the secretary's duties changed several times over the Early Modern period, but in general, the Département de la Maison du Roi oversaw four main areas: the "Maison du Roi" ("Household of the King"), the "Bâtiments du Roi" ("Buildings of the King"), the General Affairs of the Clergy, (from 1749 on) Affairs of the RPR ("Religion Prétendue Réformée", i.e. the Huguenots), and the administration of the capital city of Paris and the provinces. The post later reappeared as the minister for the Maison du Roi.

== History ==
Starting in the 16th century and then from the 17th century on, the "Maison du Roi" was overseen by a ministry, the "Département de la Maison du Roi", directed by a secretary of state, the "Secrétaire d'État à la Maison du Roi". Along with the "Department of War" ("département de la Guerre"), the "Département de la Maison du Roi" was the oldest of the specialized State Ministries, created in 1570 by Charles IX who reunited—under the control of Simon Fizes de Sauve—the "ordinaire des guerres" and the Military Maison du Roi. Both departments were dissociated in 1594: Nicolas de Neufville, seigneur de Villeroy took over the Département of Foreign Affairs and the Department of War, while Martin Ruzé de Beaulieu took over the Maison du Roi.

In 1661, the département was expanded to include Religious Affairs. In 1669, Jean-Baptiste Colbert bought the post from Henri de Guénégaud du Plessis-Belleville, and thus combined under his control the Maison du Roi with the Department of the Navy and the position of Contrôleur général des finances (chief financial officer of the realm). The Secretary of the Department of the Maison du Roi and Contrôleur général des finances would be linked only until 1699, but the Maison du roi and Religious Affairs would remain linked with Department of the Navy until 1749 (except for a brief separation from 1715–1718).

After the downfall of Maurepas in 1749, the Department was broken apart: the Department of the Navy was made into its own Department and given to Rouillé while the Department of the Maison du Roi and of Religious Affairs was given over to the comte de Saint-Florentin.

The offices of the department were few: only four buildings in 1771, five in 1789. The department's archives are stored in two places: the "Grands Augustins" and the Palais du Louvre/Palace of the Louvre.

== Oversight ==
=== The Maison du Roi ===
The "Maison du Roi" (Household of the King) was the name of the military, domestic and religious entourage around the Royal Family in the Kingdom of France. In essence, the Secretary's oversight was purely formal, as the officers of the "Maison du Roi" were under the direct authority of the Grand Maître of France (Chief Steward of France). Moreover, in practice, the military branch of the Maison du Roi was run by the Minister of War. The "Secrétaire d'État à la Maison du Roi" was however in charge of recruiting officers for the "Maison du Roi", and would receive prospective applications for posts and submit them to the king for his approval.

=== The King's Buildings ===
The Secrétaire d'État à la Maison du Roi oversaw the "Bâtiments du Roi" (Buildings of the King), run by (at various periods) a superintendent or directeur général of buildings. The service was responsible for the royal residences and for royal patronage of architecture, painting and sculpture. It also ran the Manufacture des Gobelins, the Manufacture de la Savonnerie and the Manufacture nationale de Sèvres.

The Secretary also oversaw (either directly or through the service of the Bâtiments du Roi) cultural and scientific institutions such as the Bibliothèque du Roi, the Paris Observatory, the Jardin des Plantes, the Collège royal, French academies and royal entertainment.

=== Religious Affairs ===
The Secrétaire d'État à la Maison du Roi was in charge of religious benefices. He oversaw the conduct of bishops, the elections of abbeys and of the heads of French religious orders. He was in charge of relations between the government and the clergy.

In 1749 the Secretary of State of the Maison du Roi was combined with the Secretary of State for Protestant Affairs in charge of the overseeing French Protestant affairs, although the two departments remained distinct.

=== Administration of Paris and the provinces ===
The Secrétaire d'État à la Maison du Roi was also in charge of the policing and general administration of French provinces (at first those with provincial estates or "pays d'état", and eventually over all other internal provinces), except for border regions (which were supervised by the Department of War).

From 1589, and excepting the period 1749-1757, the position was also in charge of the city of Paris (lighting of streets, cleaning of streets, repression of beggars, oversight in moral affairs, foreigners, censorship of books, surveillance of newspapers and of public entertainment). In this role, he worked in collaboration with the lieutenant général de police and his administration.

== Secretaries of State of the Maison du Roi ==
The Department of the "Maison du Roi" was dominated, from 1690 to 1775, by the Phélypeaux family.

1. 1570–1579: Simon Fizes de Sauve
2. 1588–1613: Martin Ruzé de Beaulieu
3. 1606–1638: Antoine de Loménie
4. 1615–1643: Henri-Auguste de Loménie, comte de Brienne
5. 1643–1669: Henry de Guénegaud
6. 1669–1683: Jean-Baptiste Colbert (1619–1683), who was also Contrôleur général des finances, Secrétaire d'État à la Marine, Surintendant des bâtiments, arts et manufactures.
7. 1672–1690: Jean-Baptiste Colbert, marquis de Seignelay
8. 1690–1699: Louis Phélypeaux, comte de Pontchartrain (1643–1727), who was also Contrôleur général des finances and Secrétaire d'État à la Marine.
9. 1699–1715: Jérôme Phélypeaux (1674–1747), comte de Pontchartrain, who was also Secrétaire d'État à la Marine
10. 1715–1718: Louis Phélypeaux, marquis de La Vrillière (1672–1725)
11. 1718–1749: Jean-Frédéric Phélypeaux, comte de Maurepas (1701–1781), who was also Secrétaire d'État à la Marine (1723–1749)
12. 1749–1775: Louis Phélypeaux, comte de Saint-Florentin (1705–1777)
13. 1775–1776: Guillaume-Chrétien de Lamoignon de Malesherbes
14. 1776–1783: Antoine-Jean Amelot de Chaillou
15. 1783–1787: Louis Auguste Le Tonnelier de Breteuil
16. 1788–1789: Pierre-Charles Laurent de Villedeuil
17. 1789–1791: François-Emmanuel Guignard, comte de Saint-Priest

== See also ==
- Great Officers of the Crown of France
- French nobility
- Early Modern France
- Ancien Régime in France
