= Pierre-Charles Laurent de Villedeuil =

Pierre-Charles Laurent de Villedeuil (11 October 1742, Bouchain - 28 April 1828, Paris) was Controller-General of Finances under Louis XVI. His father, the engineer Pierre-Joseph Laurent, became rich thanks to his part in founding the compagnie des mines d'Anzin and was ennobled around 1750 as marquis de Villedeuil.

== Ministry ==
Initially intendant for the Généralité of Rouen, on 3 May 1787 Loménie de Brienne made him controller general of finance, succeeding Michel Bouvard de Fourqueux. France's economy was in a severe crisis that his predecessors Calonne and Bouvard de Fourqueux had been unable to resolve. It was Brienne who actually acted as finance minister, with Villedeuil doing the work under his control - the latter left the role only four months later, pleading ill health.

During his short time in the role, the measures he put in places did not prove sufficient to rectify the situation or to avoid the assembly of the Estates General. Opposing the Estates General, he left for England in July 1789 but returned to France in 1792 to plan Louis XVI's escape after the failure of his attempt to flee at Varennes. After Louis' execution he emigrated to Scotland and only returned to France after the fall of Napoleon. After the Bourbon Restoration he was elected a member of the Académie des inscriptions et belles-lettres and made a knight commander of the king's orders. He was painted by Charles Crauk early in the 19th century - the portrait is in the Musée des Beaux-Arts de Valenciennes.
