= Antoine-Jean Amelot de Chaillou =

French politician

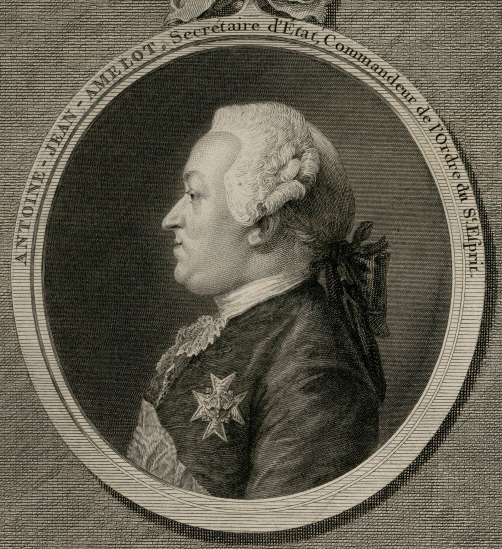
A.J. Amelot

Antoine-Jean Amelot de Chaillou (French: [ɑ̃twan ʒɑ̃ aməlo də ʃaju]; 19 November 1732 – 20 April 1795, the 1st of Floréal in year III of the Revolutionary calendar) was a French politician.

The son of Jean-Jacques Amelot de Chaillou and Marie Anne de Vougny, he held a number of positions throughout his political career. He was a maître des requêtes in 1753, president of the Grand Conseil and an esteemed intendant of Bourgogne in 1764, intendant of finances in 1774, Secretary of State of the Maison du Roi from May 12, 1776, to November 18, 1783. He was a commander of the Order of the Saint-Esprit. He married Françoise Marie Legendre and the couple had two daughters, Marie Catherine (born 1762) and Jeanne Marie (born 1764) who became "comtesse de La Ferté" through marriage.

Amelot de Chaillou became an honorary member of the Académie royale des sciences on April 16, 1777, and became vice-president of the Academy in 1778, president in 1779, and honorary member after the reorganization on April 23, 1785. He was also made an honorary member of the Académie des inscriptions et belles-lettres in 1777.

Amelot de Chaillou was arrested, like many nobles, in 1792 and he died in the Luxembourg prison in 1795; his son, Antoine Léon, the intendant of Bourgogne from 1783 to 1790 made it through the Revolution mostly unscathed.
