= Maison du Roi =

Royal household of the Kingdom of France

Coat of arms of the King of France

The Maison du Roi (French pronunciation: [mɛzɔ̃ dy ʁwa], 'King's Household') was the royal household of the King of France. It comprised the military, domestic, and religious entourage of the French royal family during the Ancien Régime and Bourbon Restoration.

== Organisation ==
The exact composition and duties of its various divisions changed constantly during the early modern period in France. Officers of the Maison du Roi were directly responsible to the Grand maître de France (Chief Steward). Starting in the 16th century and then from the 17th century on, the Maison du Roi was overseen by a ministry, the Département de la Maison du Roi, directed by a secretary of state, the Secrétaire d'État à la Maison du Roi. The structure of the Maison du Roi was officially reorganized under Henry III in 1578 and 1585, and in the 17th century by Jean-Baptiste Colbert.

== The Military Maison du Roi ==
The military branch of the Maison du Roi was the lifeguard brigade of the French army, made up of cavalry and infantry units. Officers' ranks were open only to gentlemen, though some of its units were drawn from elite troops among commoners in the rest of the army. The brigade was not solely ceremonial and actively participated in all 16th- and 17th-century French campaigns.

== The Religious Maison du Roi ==
The Ecclesiastical Household of the king was headed by the Grand Almoner of France (Grand aumônier de France) (created by Francis I), most often a bishop. The king's chapel (la chapelle du roi)—which did not originally refer to a building, but to the religious entourage of the king—was in charge of the Mass and religious ceremonies (marriages, baptisms) for the sovereign and the royal family and the king's alms and public charities.

It was headed by the Grand Almoner, who was assisted by the First Almoner, who fulfilled the duties of the Grand Almoner when the latter was unable to. Other officers of the Maison ecclésiastique included several aumôniers ordinaires (who maintained the regular service of the chapel), the prédicateur du roi (or "king's preacher"), who preached in the presence of the king, and the king's confessor.

The royal chapel also included a group of ecclesiastics and musicians for the religious services, divided into two sections: the chapel and oratory (chapelle et oratoire)—directed by the master of the Oratory (sous-maître de l'Oratoire)—which celebrated spoken Masses, and the grande chapelle—directed by the master of the chapel (maître de la chapelle)—which celebrated Masses in plainchant. In the reign of Louis XV, the musicians of the two chapels were united. Oversight was eventually transferred (in 1761) from the Ecclesiastical household to the King's Chamber, and the position of master of the chapel was eliminated.

== The Domestic Maison du Roi ==
The Maison du Roi civile, or domestic entourage of the king, was divided into a number of departments, whose number varied over the years. Under Louis XIV it consisted of 22 departments. Each department was headed by one of the grands officiers de la maison du roi de France (a title similar to, but not the same as, grand officier de la couronne de France). From the 16th to the 17th centuries, the Maison du Roi civile consisted of around 1000–2000 individuals.

The most important departments were the following:

=== The "Bouche du roi" ===
The largest of the departments, the Bouche du roi oversaw the meals of the king. It was run by the Premier Maître d'hôtel. The seven offices of the department were:

- gobelet: wine and drink, run by the Grand Bouteiller
- cuisine-bouche: cuisine
- paneterie: bakers
- échansonnerie: cupbearers, in charge of wine and other drinks
- cuisine-commun: communal kitchen
- fruiterie: fruits
- fourrière: 'forager,' in charge of wood and fuel

Officers included the Maître d'hôtel ordinaire, the 12 Maîtres d'hôtel servant par quartier, the Grand panetier, the Premier écuyer tranchant and the Grand échanson (three offices that had become purely honorific in the Early Modern period), and the 36 gentleman servants.

=== The King's Chamber ===
Directed by the Grand Chambrier of France or Grand Chambellan of France, this department oversaw the king's rooms and his personal escort. After the Bouche du roi, it was the second largest. It consisted of four First Gentlemen of the chambre, the gentlemen of the chambre, the valets de chambre, the pages, the huissiers and the children of honor. Their proximity to the king made these charges particularly esteemed.

=== The "Menus-Plaisirs" ===
The complete name of this department was argenterie, menus plaisirs et affaires de la chambre du roi ("silver, small entertainments and affairs of the king's chamber"). The Menus-Plaisirs du Roi was in charge of theater decor, costumes and props for plays, ballets and other court entertainments. It was run by an intendant.

=== The Ceremonies ===
Created in 1585 by Henry III, this service was in charge of public ceremonies such as: baptisms, marriages and royal funerals, coronations and the "sacre" (or anointment), royal entries into towns, royal festivals, ambassadorial receptions, États généraux, etc. It was run by the Grand maître des cérémonies, assisted by the maître and the aide of cérémonies.

=== The Royal Stables ===
Divided in 1582 into two parts:

- the Grande Écurie, run by the Grand écuyer of France, called « M. le Grand », who oversaw the transport of the king and his ceremonial entourage (heralds, men of arms, musicians, etc.)
- the Petite Écurie, run by the premier écuyer, called « M. le Premier », comprising squires, pages, foot valets, coaches, harnesses, saddles and coachmen.

=== The Venery ===
This was the king's hunting service, run by the Grand Veneur (the Master of the Hunt and Royal Game Warden), consisted of the vénerie (hunting on horseback), louveterie (wolf hunting, run by the Grand Louvetier), falcon hunting (run by the Grand Falconer) and the vautrait (boar hunting, run by the Capitaine du vautrait or Capitaine des toiles).

== Great Officers of the Royal Household ==
The major offices of the royal household are sometimes listed as the grands officiers de la maison du roi de France, not to be confused with the Great Officers of the Crown of France, with which it overlaps in part. Although lists of the Great Officers vary, the following are generally considered Great Officers of the Royal Household:

Domestic household:

- Grand Maître de France (also one of the Great Officers of the Crown of France)

- the First Maître d'hôtel (Chief Butler) – overseeing the king's table and the bouches du roi

- the Grand Panetier of France, overseeing bread
- the Grand Échanson de France, overseeing wine
- the First "Écuyer tranchant", who cuts the meat of the king

- the Grand Chambrier of France or the Grand Chambellan of France, head of the King's chambre, (also one of the Great Officers of the Crown of France)

- the four First gentlemen of the King's Chamber, who oversee the King's chambre
- the four First Valets of the King's Chamber, who oversee, under the direction of the first gentlemen, the King's chambre

- the Grand Maître de la garde-robe, who oversees the King's wardrobe
- the Grand Écuyer de France, the head stablemaster (also one of the Great Officers of the Crown of France)

- the first écuyer de France, who seconds the Grand écuyer

- the Grand Huntsman of France (Grand Veneur), who directs royal hunts, especially the stag hunt
- the Grand Falconer of France, who directs royal hunts using birds of prey
- the Grand Louvetier of France, who directs royal hunts of wolves and boar
- the Grand Master of Ceremonies of France (grand maître des cérémonies), who directs court ceremonies and protocol
- the Grand Marshal of lodging (maréchal des logis), who oversees lodging of the king, of the court and of the royal household
- the Grand Provost of France, who heads the court police, and for this purpose, has jurisdiction over the military troops of the Maison du Roi
- the Grand Almoner of France, at the head of the royal chapel and the head of the Ecclesiastical House of the King (the maison ecclésiastique du roi de France)

- the first Almoner of France, who aids the Grand Almoner

Military household:

Captain of the bodyguard
Captain-colonel of the Cent-Suisses
Colonel General of the Suisses et Grisons
Captain-colonel of the guards of the king's door
Captain-lieutenant of the gendarmes of the guard
Captain-lieutenant of the chevau-légers (light cavalry) of the guard
Colonel General of the Musketeers of the guard

Captain-lieutenant of the first company of the Musketeers of the guard

Captain-lieutenant of the grenadiers à cheval of the guard

== The Secretary of State of the Maison du Roi ==
Starting in the 16th century and then from the 17th century on, the Maison du Roi was overseen by a ministry, the Département de la Maison du Roi. This ministry was directed by a secretary of state, the Secrétaire d'État à la Maison du Roi, although this oversight was purely formal, as the officers of the Maison du Roi were under the direct authority of the Grand maître de France (Chief Steward of France).

In practice, the military branch of the Maison du Roi was run by the Minister of War. The Secrétaire d'État à la Maison du Roi was, however, in charge of recruiting officers for the Maison du Roi and would receive prospective applications for posts and submit them to the king for his approval.

== See also ==
- Conseil du Roi
- Great Officers of the Crown of France

General:

- Early Modern France
- French nobility
