= Secretary of State for Protestant Affairs =

Position in the Ancien Régime

The secretary of state for protestant affairs (French: Secrétaire d'État de la Religion Prétendue Réformée, or R.P.R., the "So-called Reformed Religion"), was the secretary of state in France during the "Ancien Régime" and Bourbon Restoration in charge of overseeing French Protestant affairs. From 1749 on, the position was combined with the position of secretary of state of the Maison du Roi.

== History ==
During the preparation and implementation of the Edict of Nantes (finalized in 1598), an administrative department was created to oversee Protestant affairs. By a royal decision in 1588, one of the four secretaries of state of Henry III, Pierre Forget de Fresnes, was given the responsibility of negotiating with the provinces which had large Huguenot populations (Languedoc, Dauphiné, Orléanais, Maine, Anjou, Poitou, Saintonge, Angoumois). Trusted by Henry IV, Pierre Forget de Fresnes became the principal author of the Edict of Nantes (which he co-signed), and organizer of the department of Protestant affairs.

From 1610 to 1775, this position was held by members of the Phélypeaux family.

Until the revocation of the Edict of Nantes (1685), the secretary – whose oversight covered a huge geographical area – was especially concerned with communicating with provincial governors, intendants and bishops regarding real or imagined violations of the provisions of the Edict, and disputes concerning the demolition of temples and religious freedom. As public opinion in the 17th century became increasingly hostile to the Huguenots, the secretaries fulfilled their duties in applying more rigorous measures on the Protestants. In 1685, the then-secretary, Balthazar Phélypeaux, countersigned the Edict of Fontainebleau.

The department continued to exist after the revocation, although its purview changed. Other than the uprising of the Camisards, the secretaries' duties were focused on two areas: managing the spoliated goods of fugitive Huguenots (which could be transferred to their nearest relatives, provided they were Catholics, but only after extensive legal examination and with the approval of the "Conseil des dépêches") and – at the request of provincial intendants – the removal of children from families suspected of not having fully converted and of placing them in foster care in convents or in homes for new Catholics.

Louis Phélypeaux, secretary for 50 years, was famous for the severity with which he fulfilled his duties. Disagreeing with the tolerant policies of the last years of the reign of Louis XV, and with those that the arrival of Anne Robert Jacques Turgot to power seemed to predict, he resigned from the post in 1775.

After 1749 the department of Protestant affairs was attached to the department of the secretary of state of the Maison du Roi. Named to the secretary position in 1775, Guillaume de Lamoignon de Malesherbes espoused values which were in direct opposition to those of his predecessor, and he wished above all to prepare for the return of Protestants to the country. Although his brief tenure (10 months) did not allow him to fulfill his wishes personally, he continued to lobby for this during the tenures of his successors. In 1787, an edict gave Protestants the right to be legal citizens in France.

== List of secretaries of state ==
- 1598–1610: Pierre Forget de Fresnes
- 1610–1621: Le Seigneur de Pontchartrain
- 1621–1629: Le Seigneur d'Herbault et de La Vrillière
- 1629–1681: Le Marquis de Châteauneuf et Tanlay
- 1669–1700: Balthazar Phélypeaux
- 1700–1725: Le Marquis de La Vrillière
- 1723–1775: Le Duc de La Vrillière

After 1749, the position was united with the position of secretary of state of the Maison du Roi:

- 1775–1776: Guillaume de Lamoignon de Malesherbes
- 1776–1785: Amelot de Chaillou
- 1785–1787: Le Baron de Breteuil
- 1787–1789: Laurent de Villedeuil

== See also ==
- France in the early modern period
- Ancien Régime
