= Controller-General of Finances =

Position in the Ancien Régime of France

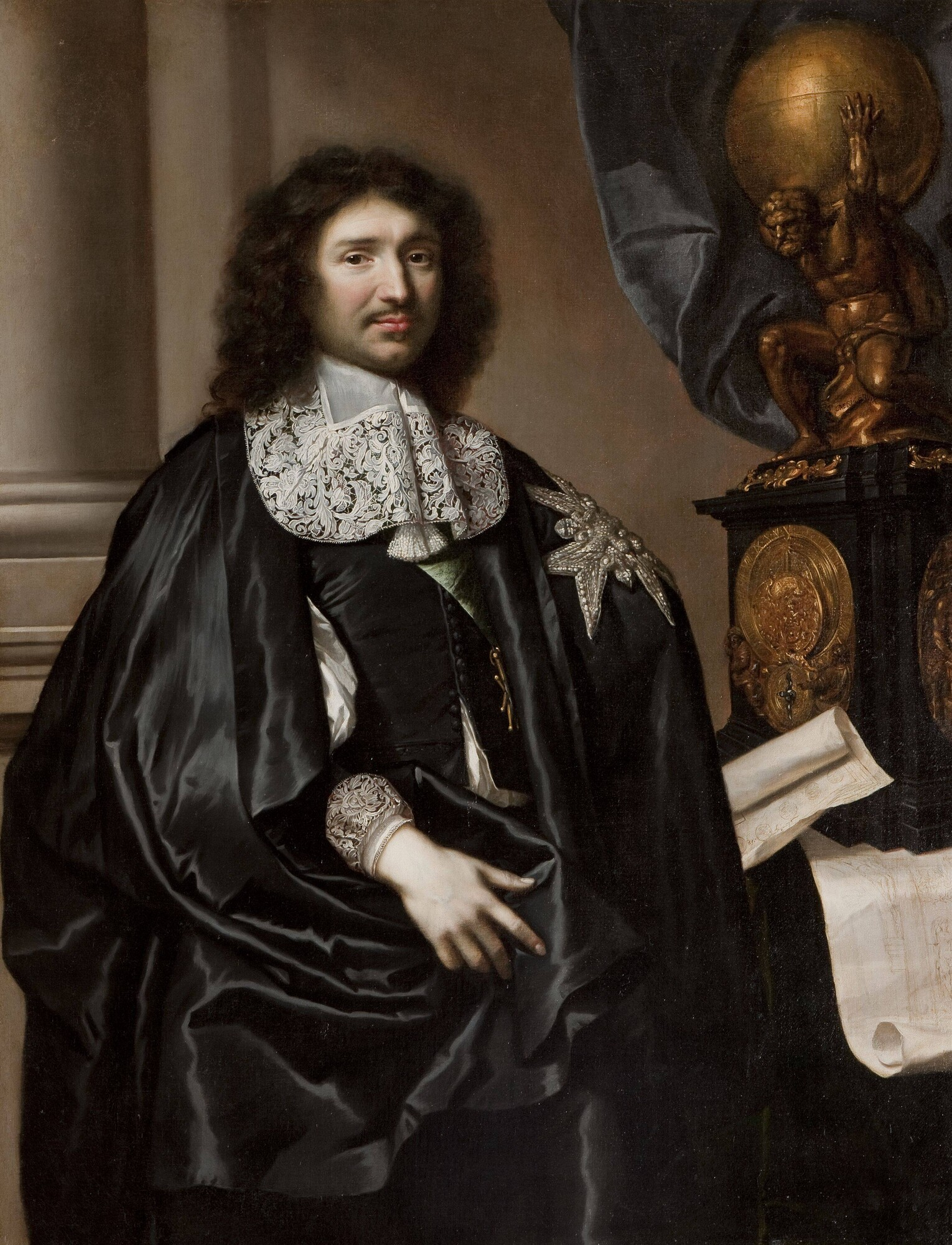
First Minister Jean-Baptiste Colbert

The Controller-General or Comptroller-General of Finances (French: Contrôleur général des finances) was the name of the minister in charge of finances in the Kingdom of France from 1661 to 1791. It replaced the former position of Superintendent of Finances, which was abolished with the downfall of Nicolas Fouquet. It did not hold any real political power until 1665, when First Minister Jean-Baptiste Colbert, who had acted upon financial matters since Fouquet's embezzlement charge, was appointed to the office.

== History ==
The term "contrôleur général" in reference to a position of royal accounting and financial oversight had existed in various forms prior to 1547, but the direct predecessor to the 17th century "Controller-General" was created in 1547, with two position-holders whose job was to verify the accounts of the Royal Treasurer (trésorier de l'Échiquier), then the head of the royal financial system. The name of the charge of the controllers came from their account book, or contre-rôle (literally "counter-roll", meaning scroll copy), in which they kept their accounts in order to compare them with those of the Royal Treasurer. The office was thus, in the beginning, not a senior rank governmental position, but merely an accounting audit charge.

In the period following 1547, the financial administration in France continued to evolve, resulting in 1552 in the creation of Intendants of Finances (intendants des finances), of which one was to become in 1561 the leading Superintendent of Finances (surintendant des finances) with cabinet rank. In 1661, the last Superintendent of Finances, Nicolas Fouquet, was arrested by order of King Louis XIV and charged with embezzlement, so that subsequently Jean-Baptiste Colbert became head of the royal financial and tax collection administration, at first with the title of intendant général, then, from 1665, with the title of contrôleur général des finances. The title Superintendent of Finances was abolished.

Under Colbert's competent and dynamic administration, the Controller-General's responsibilities were greatly redefined. Louis XIV suppressed the two already existing positions holding the title of Controller-General as he wanted to replace these with a sole homonym office with cabinet rank in charge of all the finances and taxes of France. Furthermore, this new position was no longer transmissible as the head of state could revoke the respective commission at his pleasure at any time. In addition, the new position was far better connected with the Royal Finance Counsel (Conseil royal des finances) than the previous charge of Superintendent. In these ways, the Controller-General became a true senior governmental post.

The function of Controller-General would continue until 1791, with an interruption at the era of the Polysynody (1715–1718) under the regency of Philippe d'Orléans during the childhood of King Louis XV, when all ministerial offices were replaced by councils composed of members of the high aristocracy. Occasionally, the de facto Minister of Finance served instead as President of the Royal Council of Finance, who had a superior rank to a mere Controller-General of Finances, or, in the case of Jacques Necker, who, being a Protestant, could not serve as Controller-General, as Director-General of Finances and of the Treasury (Directeur général du Trésor royal and Directeur général des Finances from 1776 to 1781 and again from 1788 until 1790), in ceremonial terms a position ranked below the previous two.

The position was renamed Minister of Finances in 1791 which, along with all other ministerial positions, was abolished in 1794, but restored with the advent of the French Directory in 1795. Nowadays the position is called (with exceptions) Ministry of Economics and Finance.

== Responsibilities ==
The responsibilities of the Controller-General were the most extensive of all the administrative positions of the Ancien Régime. According to the official description of 1665, the Controller-General had the power "to report in our Counsel of all affairs which are of concern to our service and of any others" ("faire rapport en notre Conseil de toutes les affaires qui concerneront notre service et de toutes autres indifféremment").

Colbert, first of the Controllers-General with subsequent power, was also head of two other senior government posts equivalent to present-day ministers (from a total of six): Secretary of State of the Navy and Secretary of State of the Maison du Roi (Royal Household), both from 1669 till his death in 1683. In addition to those cabinet posts, he had also several important posts as administration chief, such as surintendant des Manufactures et Bâtiments du Roi (Superintendent of the King's Manufacturers and Buildings; 1664–1683).

The Controller-General's responsibilities were manifold:

- the control of State expenditures
- the control of State revenues (taxes and fees)
- the control of external and internal customs (traites)
- the management of the national economy
- the control of manufacturers and merchants
- the management of most of the civil services and public infrastructure, including bridges and roads (ponts et chaussées), ports and canals
- the control of the merchant navy

The position was very well paid: in addition to 200,000 livres tournois (French pounds) by year (the average income of a worker was about 250 to 300 livres per year), the Controller-General could also gain 20,000 livres as Minister of State, not to forget the bribes he would receive during the renewal phase of contracts to the Ferme Générale (General Lease, meaning the selling to private companies or individuals of the time-limited right to collect all the indirect taxes plus bonus fees in a defined portion of the country, an extremely lucrative business for the leaseholders).

The Controller-General participated in a number of the King's Councils. He was always member of the Conseil des dépêches (lit. "counsel of messages", which dealt with the news from the provinces), the Royal Finance Counsel (Conseil royal des finances) and the Royal Commerce Counsel (Conseil royal de commerce). He was nearly always a Minister of State (the highest ceremonial rank for a cabinet member), which allowed him to attend the High Counsel also known as the State Counsel (Conseil d'en haut or Conseil d'État, the paramount institution of the royal government). In the French language exists only one word for the English words "Council" and "Counsel": Conseil. Therefore one can find in the literature both English words as translations of the French Conseil names.

The Controller-General was generally chosen from among the regionally based Intendants of Finances or from the Maîtres des requêtes (lit. "master of requests", an earlier form of public prosecutor). Of all ministerial positions, the Controller-General was the least stable, especially during the reigns of Louis XV and Louis XVI, to such a point that the Controller-General's official seat was called the Residence of Removals (hôtel des déménagements).

== Organisation ==
Unlike other government departments of the French monarchy, the contrôle général des Finances was organised in a highly systematic manner. It was divided into several services under the immediate authority of the Controller-General. However, he named for each service a senior managing assistant who was initially called intendant des Finances, a title which was later replaced by intendant général des Finances or directeur général des Finances in order to avoid any confusion with the Intendants des Finances established in the different regions of France. There were between three and twelve of these senior aids in financial and fiscal matters during the Ancien Régime (six at the end of the 18th century shortly before the Revolution).

In the same way, the Controller-General was assisted by four and, later five, Intendants (généraux) du Commerce. The Contrôle Général had a rather large personnel staff compared to other government departments. The central services were either in Paris (notably at the Palais Mazarin, Rue Neuve-des-Petits-Champs), close to the bankers and financiers that the ministry dealt with, or at the Royal Palace in Versailles.

However, the important collaborators of the Controller-General were the intendants established in the different regions of France. Initially the king had been represented in the provinces by the governors and since 1620 by the intendants who at first were only in charge of the collection of direct taxes and of regional public finances. Traditionally, the governors were chosen by the king from the ranks of the highest aristocracy. Nevertheless, as they had occasionally challenged the royal authority in their respective regions, the kings responded by retaining them as often as possible at the Royal Palace, so that the function of governor finally became only a ceremonial title.

As a consequence, the real power in the regions shifted towards the intendant, who since 1666 had the official title of "Intendent of Police, Justice and Finances and Commissioner sent in the Généralités of the Realm for the Execution of the King's Orders" (Intendant de police, justice et finances, Commissaire départi dans les généralités du royaume pour l'exécution des ordres du Roi), or in short intendant (de généralité).

There were 33 of them, each one at the head of a Généralité, which at first was simply a tax collection district of France, but became more and more a general administration province of the royal government. Subsequently the Intendants saw their powers and competences increased at such a level, that they were nicknamed "the right hand of the King in the province".

== See also ==
- List of finance ministers of France
- Superintendent of Finances
- Intendant
- Généralité
- Conseil du roi
- Secretary of State for Foreign Affairs (France)
- Secretary of State of the Navy (France)
- Secretary of State of the Maison du Roi
- Early Modern France
