= Secretary of State for Foreign Affairs (France) =

The Secretary of State for Foreign Affairs was one of the four or five specialized secretaries of state in the Kingdom of France during the Ancien Régime. The Secretary of State for Foreign Affairs became the Minister of Foreign Affairs in 1791.

For a list of secretaries, see: Minister of Foreign Affairs.

== See also ==
- Secretary of State (Ancien Régime)
- Secretary of State for Protestant Affairs
- Secretary of State for War (France)
- Secretary of State of the Maison du Roi
- Secretary of State of the Navy (France)
