= Secretary of State of the Navy (France) =

Specialised secretary of state in France during the Ancien Régime

The secretary of state of the Navy (French: Secrétaire d'État de la Marine) was one of the four or five specialised secretaries of state in France during the Ancien Régime. This officeholder was responsible for the French Navy and for all of the French colonies. On 26 October 1790, during the French Revolution, the position was renamed to Minister of the Navy and the Colonies.

== See also ==
- List of naval ministers of France
- Ancien Régime
- Early modern France
