= Colbert family =

Colbert dynasty of French origin

- Country: Kingdom of France; French Empire
- Origin: Reims
- Titles: Marquis of Chabanais; Marquis of Seignelay; Marquis of Villacerf; Marquis of Torcy; Marquis of Maulévrier; Marquis of Saint-Pouange; Baron of Colbert
- Distinctions: Archbishop of Rouen; Archbishop of Toulouse; Bishops of Luçon, Auxerre, Mâcon, Montauban
- Estates: List: * Château de Creully; * Château du Saussay; * Château de Villacerf; * Place des Vosges; * Beuzeville-la-Guérard; * Château de Flaugergues

The Colbert family is a surviving family of the French nobility, originally from Reims, Marne. Descended from merchants and bankers established in Reims and Troyes in the 16th century, the family formed several branches which successively acceded to the nobility during the 17th century. The Troyes line, a cadet branch which is the only branch surviving today, was the first to be ennobled in 1603 by the purchase of a position as Counselor Secretary to the King.

Following Jean-Baptiste Colbert, advisor to Cardinal Mazarin who, upon the death of the Cardinal, became minister to King Louis XIV, the Colbert family knew how to benefit from the social advancement of Louis XIV's minister and to give its members access to the highest offices and functions of the kingdom. In addition to the famous minister of Louis XIV, the Colbert family gave many dignitaries to the Kingdom of France, ministers, bishops, and general officers, from the second half of the 17th century to the end of the 18th century. From Louis XIV to the French Revolution, it belonged to the high nobility of the country.

== History ==
The first known Colbert, Jehan Colbert, was a masonry contractor in Reims, who married Marie Thuillier in 1492. They were the parents of:

- Gérard Colbert, Lord of Magneux and Crèvecoeur, bourgeois of Reims, married in c. 1519 to Jeanne Thierry:
  - Oudard/Édouard Colbert, bourgeois of Reims, haberdashery merchant, married in c. 1548 to Marie Coquebert:
    - Gérard Colbert (1550–1617), merchant in Amiens, then goldsmith in Paris, grandfather, through his son Nicolas Colbert d'Acy (1595–1649): of Elisabeth Colbert (d. 1691; prioress of Saint-Louis-de-la-Rougemare Priory in Rouen); of Marie Colbert, wife of Louis de Béchameil; and of Madeleine Colbert, who married (1) Étienne Le Camus, uncle of Etienne; (2) of Claude Pellot, 1st president of the Parliament of Normandy and brother-in-law of the first Etienne Le Camus.
    - Jehan Colbert (1557–1596), Lord of Acy and Terron, bourgeois of Reims, civil and criminal lieutenant at the presidial of Reims in 1580, general controller of the salt taxes of Burgundy and Picardy in 1595, married in 1582 to Marie Bachelier: grandparents of the Minister Colbert.
    - Oudard Colbert (1560–1640), bourgeois of Troyes, merchant and banker in Troyes, advisor-secretary to the king in 1612, married in 1585 to Marie Foret (d. c. 1618), Lady of Villacerf and daughter of the wealthy Trojan merchant Nicolas Foret de Villacerf, ancestors of the surviving branch of St-Pouange, Marquis of Chabanais.

== Prominent family members ==
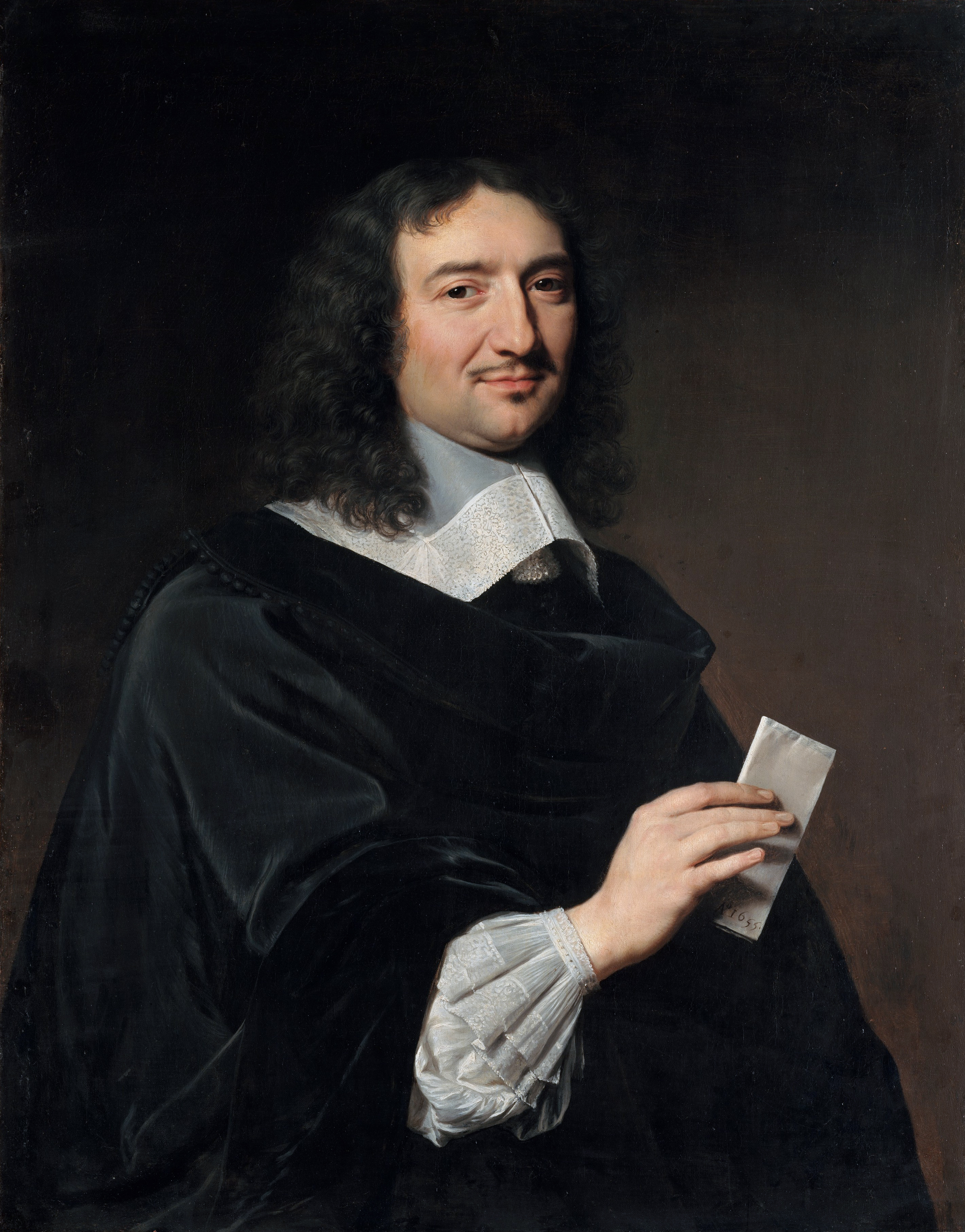
Portrait of Jean-Baptiste Colbert, by Philippe de Champaigne, 1655

- Jean-Baptiste Colbert (1619–1683), the prominent minister.
- Jean Baptiste Colbert, Marquis of Seignelay (1651–1690), Secretary of State of the Navy.
- Jacques Nicolas Colbert (1654–1707), Abbot of Bec, Archbishop of Rouen, was elected member of the Académie Française.
- Édouard Colbert, Marquis of Villacerf (1628–1699), senior official in the government of Louis XIV.
- Charles Colbert de Croissy (1629–1696), a diplomat and minister.
- Jean-Baptiste Colbert de Torcy (1665–1746), Secretary of State for Foreign Affairs.
- Charles-Joachim Colbert de Croissy (1667–1738), Bishop of Montpellier.
- Nicolas-Hubert de Mongault (1674–1746), an ecclesiastic and translator of the classics.
- Pierre David de Colbert-Chabanais (1774–1853), a general of the French Revolutionary Wars and Napoleonic Wars.
- Auguste François-Marie de Colbert-Chabanais (1777–1809), a general of the French Revolutionary Wars and Napoleonic Wars.
- Juliette Colbert de Barolo (1786–1864), a philanthropist and the founder of the Sisters of Saint Anne and the Daughters of Jesus the Good Shepherd.

=== Jehan Colbert Line ===
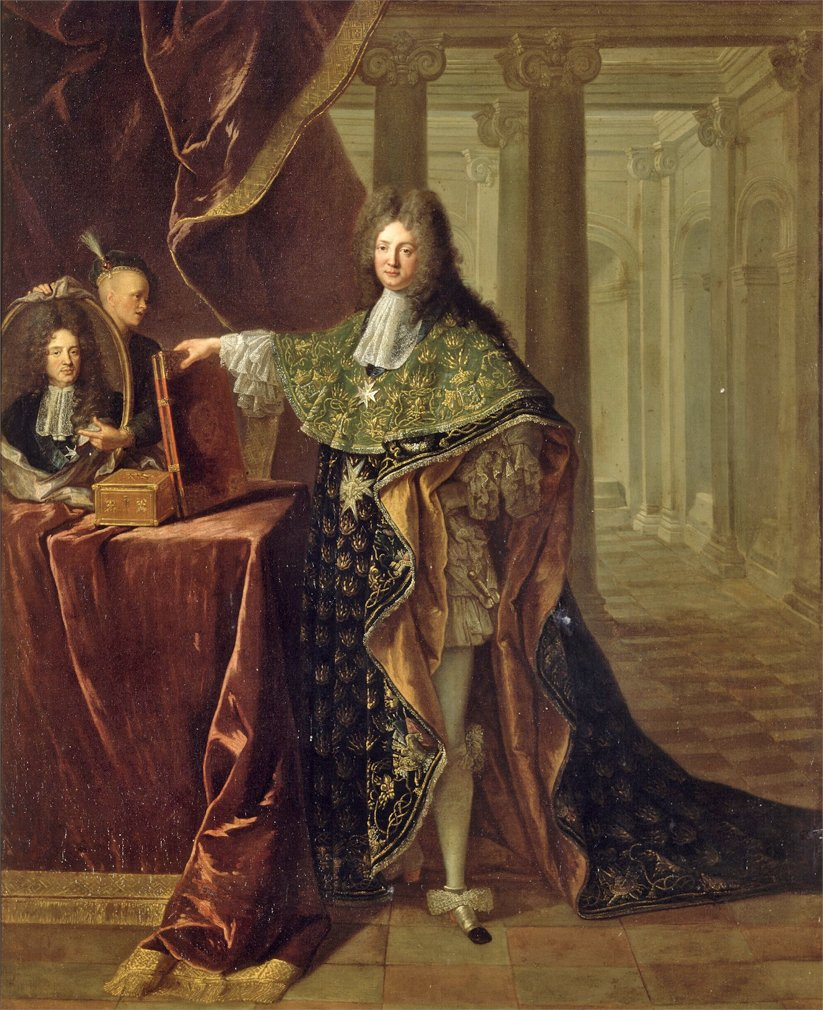
Portrait of Jean-Baptiste Colbert de Torcy by François de Troy, c. 1701

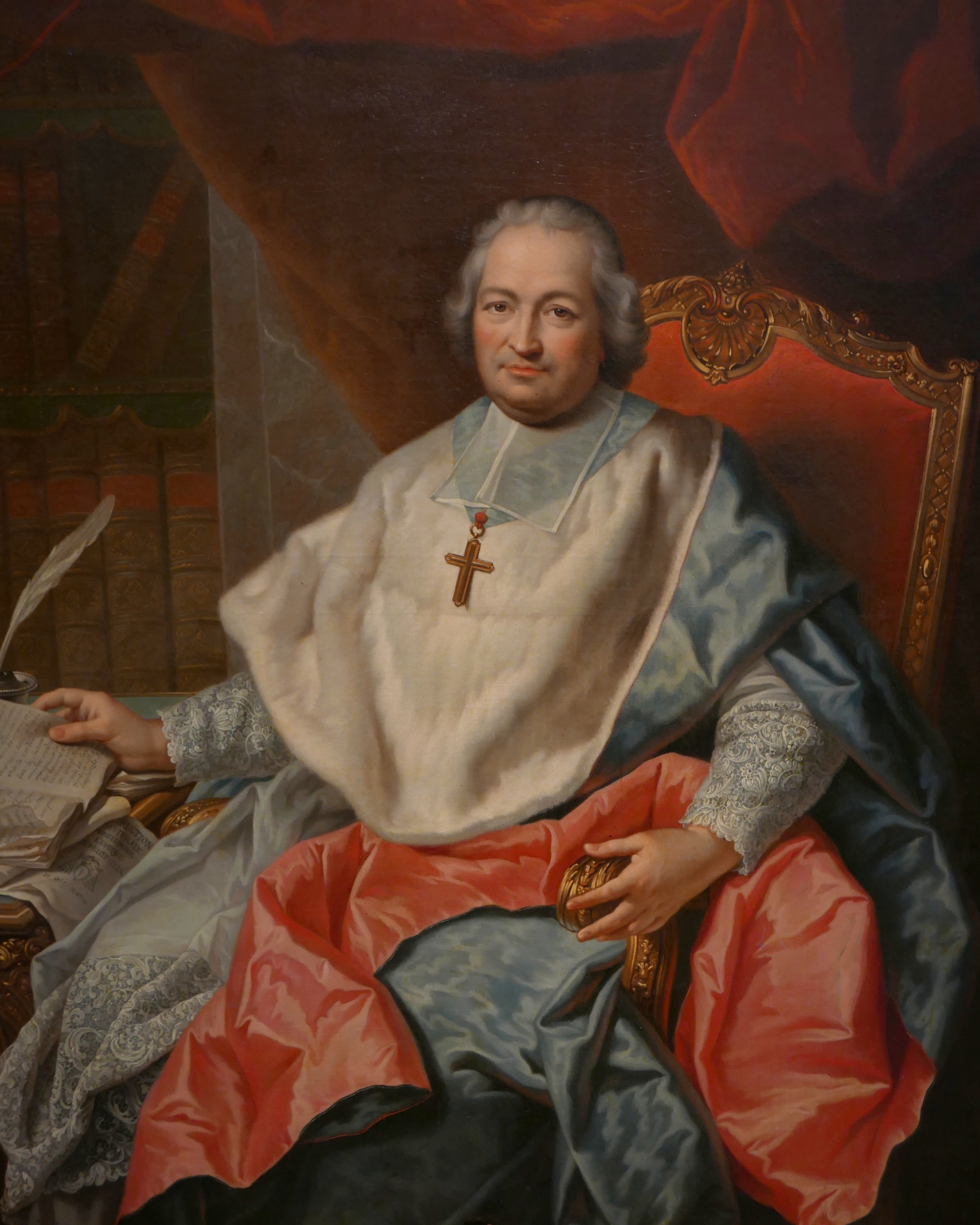
Portrait of Charles Joachim Colbert by Jean Raoux

- Jehan Colbert (1557–1596), Lord of Acy and Terron, m. 1582: Marie Bachelier.
  - Jean Colbert (1583–1663), Lord of Terron, m. 1608: Marie de Bignicourt (1593–1679)
    - Marie Colbert du Terron (b. 1616), m. 1633: Pierre Chertemps, Lord of Seuil.
      - Pierre Chertemps de Seuil (1636–1703), Lord of Seuil.
    - Charles Colbert du Terron (1628–1684); Lord of Terron and Bourbonne, founder of the military port and arsenal of Rochefort.
  - Nicolas Colbert (1590–1661), Lord of Vandières, captain of the towns and tower of Fismes, advisor secretary to the king, and advisor of state, m. Marie Pussort.
    - Claire Colbert (1618–1680), the eldest; Abbess of Sainte-Claire de Reims.
    - Jean-Baptiste Colbert (1619–1683), Lord of Vandières and Cernay, m. Marie Charron.
      - Jeanne-Marie-Thérèse Colbert (1650–1732), m. Charles Honoré d'Albert, 3rd Duke of Luynes.
      - Jean Baptiste Colbert (1651–1690), Marquis of Seignelay.
      - Jacques Nicolas Colbert (1654–1707), Abbot of Bec, Archbishop of Rouen.
      - Henriette-Louise Colbert (1657–1733), m. Paul de Beauvilliers, 2nd Duke of Saint-Aignan.
      - Antoine-Martin Colbert (1659–1689), of the Order of Malta.
      - Jules-Armand Colbert de Blainville (1663–1704), superintendent of buildings, arts and manufactures, field marshal, lieutenant-general, Grand Master of Ceremonies.
      - Marie-Anne Colbert (1665–1750), m. Louis de Rochechouart, son of Louis Victor de Rochechouart, Duke of Vivonne.
      - Louis Colbert (1667–1745), Count of Linières in Berry.
      - Charles-Edouard Colbert (1670–1690), styled Count of Sceaux.
    - Marie Colbert (1626–1702), m. Jean Desmarets.
      - Nicolas Desmarets (1648–1721), m. Madeleine Béchameil de Nointel.
        - Jean-Baptiste François des Marets (1682–1762), Marquis of Maillebois and Marshal of France.
    - Nicolas Colbert (1628–1676), abbot of Notre-Dame la Grande, Bishop of Luçon and Auxerre.
    - Charles Colbert de Croissy (1629–1696), m. 1664: Françoise Béraud.
      - Jean Baptiste Colbert (1665–1746), Marquis of Torcy.
        - Jean-Baptiste Joachim Colbert, Marquis of Torcy, Croissy, Sablé.
      - Charles Joachim Colbert (1667–1738), Bishop of Montpellier.
    - Louise-Antoinette Colbert (1631–1698), mother superior of the Convent of the Visitation (Second) in Rouen.
    - Édouard François de Colbert-Maulévrier (1633–1693), Marquis of Maulévrier and Cholet, lieutenant-general, governor of Tournai.
      - François Édouard de Colbert-Maulévrier (1675–1706), Lord of Villepreux, m. 1698: Henriette Marthe de Froulay de Tessé (1678–1751).
        - Louis René Édouard de Colbert-Maulévrier (1699–1750), Count of Maulévrier, m. Marie Catherine Euphrasie d'Estaing.
          - François Édouard Henri René de Colbert-Maulévrier (d. 1748), Marquis of Maulévrier, m. 1746: Anne Espérance Chauvelin (1725–1801).
        - René Édouard de Colbert-Maulévrier (1706–1771), Marquis of Maulévrier, m. 1754: Charlotte de Manneville (d. 1794).
          - Édouard Victurnien Charles René de Colbert-Maulévrier (1754–1839), Marquis of Maulévrier, m. (1) 1782: Annemarie Louise de Crénolle (d. 1793), (2) 1812: Pauline Le Clerc.
            - Juliette Colbert de Barolo (1786–1864), m. 1806: Carlo Tancredi Falletti di Barolo
    - Agnès Colbert (1634–1714), elected triennial abbess of the Poor Clares of Reims in 1680 and 1683, she then governed the abbey for four more years until 1691.
    - Claire-Cécile Colbert (1640–1720), abbess of the Abbey of Lys.
  - Charles Colbert (c. 1592–1661), Lord of Saint-Mars (St-Mard, St-Marc).

=== Oudard Colbert line ===
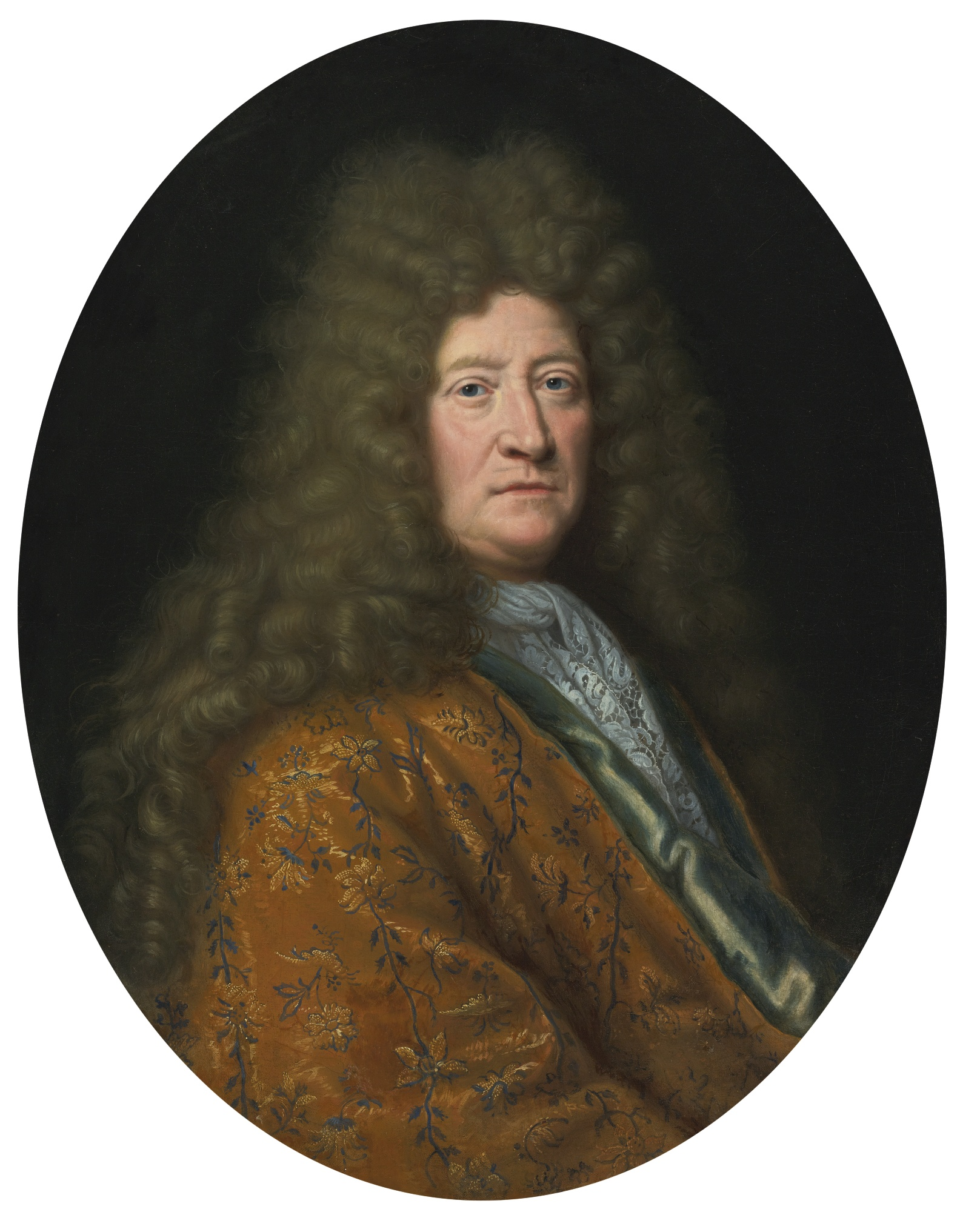
Portrait of Édouard Colbert, Marquis of Villacerf, by Pierre Mignard

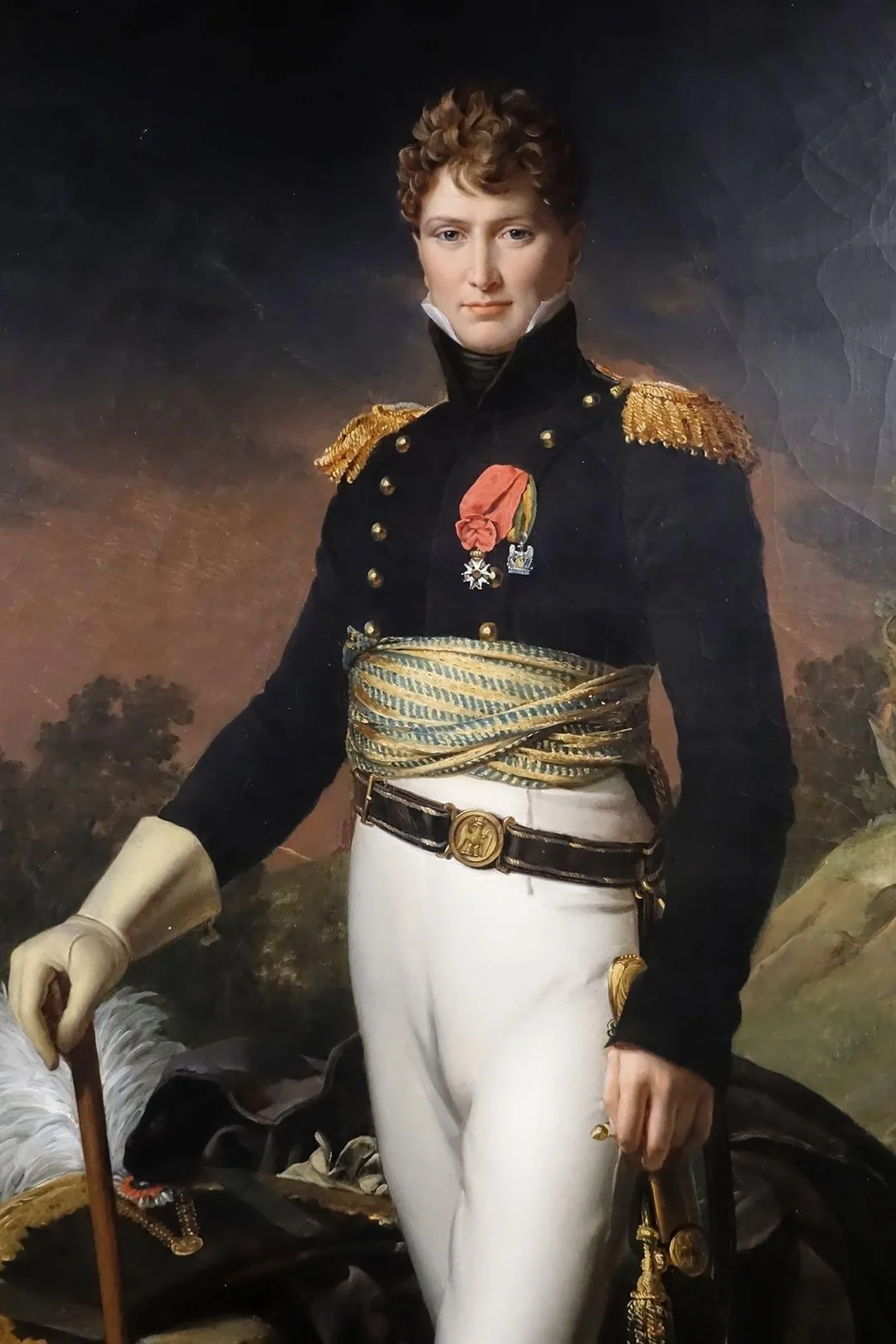
1809 portrait of Auguste François-Marie de Colbert-Chabanais by François Gérard

- Oudard Colbert (1560–1640), m. 1585: Marie Foret (d. c. 1618), Lady of Villacerf, daughter of Nicolas Foret de Villacerf.
  - Jean-Baptiste Michel Colbert (1602–1663), Lord of Saint-Pouange and Villacerf, m. Claude Le Tellier (1604–1644), daughter of Michel II Le Tellier, Lord of Chaville and Villacoublay.
    - Édouard Colbert (1628–1699), Marquis of Villacerf, m. 1658: Geneviève Larcher (d. 1712).
      - Pierre Gilbert Colbert, marquis de Villacerf (d. 1733), m. 1696: Anne Marie de Saint-Nectaire (1655–1716).
        - Marie Geneviève Françoise Colbert, m. 1716: Gilbert Henri Amable de Veyny d'Arbouze, Marquis of Villemont (1692–1767).
      - Anne-Marie Geneviève Marguerite Colbert (1665–1696), m. 1688: Jean-Baptiste de Montlezun, Lord of Lumigny.
    - Jean-Baptiste-Michel Colbert de Saint-Pouange (1640–1710), Bishop of Montauban then Archbishop of Toulouse.
    - Gilbert Colbert de Saint-Pouange (1642–1706) m. Marie Renée de Berthemet (c. 1647–1732), daughter of Laurent de Berthemet.
      - Nicolas-Hubert de Mongault (1674–1746)
      - François Gilbert Colbert (1676–1719), Marquis de Chabanais, m. 1702: Angélique d'Escoubleau (1684–1729), daughter of François d'Escoubleau, Marquis of Sourdis.
        - François-Gilbert Colbert (1705–1765), Marquis of Saint-Pouange and Chabanais, m. 1731: Marie-Jeanne Colbert (1715–1786), daughter of Louis-François Colbert (1677–1747).
          - Claude Théophile Gilbert Jean-Baptiste (1734–1789), Marquis of Chabanais and Saint-Pouange, m. Louise Perrine d'Amphernet de Pontbellanger (1741–1800), daughter of Gabriel d'Amphernet de Pontbellanger.
            - Alexandre Louis Gilbert de Colbert-Chabanais (1781–1857), Marquis de Chabanais, m. 1798 Aglaé Elisabeth Suzanne Seurrat de Guilleville (1782–1832).
          - Louis Henri François (1737–1792), titled Count of Colbert-Chabanais, m. (1): Marie Anne Boislève d'Arbonne (1742–1766); (2) 1770: Jeanne David (c. 1756–1812), daughter of Pierre Félix Barthélemy David, Lord of Grez.
            - Marie-Jeanne Colbert (1771–1795), m. 1793: André Sauveur Alexandre, Count of Neufermeil de Montry (1757–1839).
            - Ambrose Colbert (1773–1813), Count of Colbert-Chabanais, m. Barbe Louise Germon de Longueville (1778–1819).
              - Louise Elisabeth Alcine de Colbert (1802–1833), m. Charles Jean-Baptiste Hyacinthe de Collignon (b. 1794).
              - Joseph Edouard Théobald de Colbert (1803–1860)
              - Elisabeth de Colbert (1814–1894), m. Armand de Fabre de Latude (1804–1877).
            - Pierre David de Colbert-Chabanais (1774–1853), Baron of Chabanais, m. 1831: Clémentine Perrotin (1797–1874).
            - Louis Pierre Alphonse de Colbert (1776–1843), Viscount of Colbert-Chabanais, m. 1809: Isidore Eugénie Petiet (1788–1869), daughter of Claude Louis Petiet.
              - Caroline Joachime de Colbert (1812–1876), m. 1828: Albert Henri de Colbert, 1st Count of Colbert-Turgis (1794–1879).
                - The Colbert-Turgis
              - Elisabeth de Colbert (1816–1870), m. Edmond de Lantivy du Rest (1803–1870).
              - Albertine Joséphine Isidore de Colbert (1826–1845), m. 1844: Jules Petiet (1813–1871).
            - Auguste François-Marie de Colbert-Chabanais (1777–1809), 1st Baron of Colbert, m. 1803: Marie Geneviève Joséphine Camille (1785–1849), daughter of Gen. Jean Baptiste Camille, Count of Canclaux.
              - Napoléon-Joseph de Colbert-Chabanais (1805–1883), 2nd Baron of Colbert, Marquis of Chabanais, m. 1832: Angélique Charlotte Joséphine (1813–1889), daughter of Adolphe François René, 3rd Marquis of Portes, and Sophie Suzanne de Laplace.
                - Marie Adolphine Sophie de Colbert-Chabanais (1833–1917), m. 1853: Stanislas de La Rochefoucauld, 3rd Duke of Doudeauville (1822–1887), son of Sosthènes I de La Rochefoucauld.
                - Pierre Émile Arnaud Édouard de Colbert-Chabanais (1834–1905), 3rd Baron de Colbert, Marquis de Chabannais, m. 1877: Françoise Marie Auguste de Berckheim (1852–1897), daughter of Baron Sigismond Guillaume de Berckheim.
                  - Napoleon Francis Augustus de Colbert-Chabanais (1878–1961), m. (1) Marie Antoinette Alix Solange (1874–1932), daughter of Albert Edmond Edouard, Count of Tulle de Villefranche, and of Jeanne Amélie de Chevenon de Bigny; (2) Alix Hérault de La Véronne, daughter of Auguste Désiré Hérault de La Véronne and Alix Collin de La Minière.
                    - Jeanne de Colbert-Chabanais (1915–1991), m. Picot de Moras.
                    - Angelique Fanny Elisabeth (1880–1939), m. Charles des Acres, 9th Marquis de l'Aigle (1875–1935).
                  - Camille Marie Françoise de Colbert-Chabanais (1883–1969), m. 1901: Édouard de La Rochefoucauld, 12th Duke of Bisaccia (1874–1968).
                  - Guillemette de Colbert-Chabanais (1885–1944), m. François Louis Joseph Marie de Bourbon (1875–1954), 12th Count of Busset.
                - Pierre-Louis Jean-Baptiste de Colbert-Laplace (1843–1917), Count of Colbert-Laplace, m. Louise Victorine Renault (1841–1904), daughter of Jean-François Renault and Madeleine de Cinglas.
                  - Jeanne de Colbert-Laplace (b. 1870), m. Olivier de Boyer de Sainte-Suzanne (b. 1861).
                  - Auguste Jean-Baptiste de Colbert-Laplace (1872–1961), Count of Laplace, m. Marie Madeleine Clarisse Noblesse (1892–1956).
        - Antoine Alexandre de Colbert-Sourdis (1707–1788), Marquis of Sourdis, m. 1764: Victoire de Courdoumer (1738–1782).
          - Marie Julie Pauline de Colbert-Sourdis (1769–1855), m. Georges Marie Giraud (1761–1814), Baron of Montbellet.
  - Madeleine Colbert (1604–1690), m. 1620: Louis Brûlart de Genlis (d. 1646), son of Pierre Brûlart, Lord of Genlis.

== Châteaux and mansions ==
- Château de Creully
- Château du Saussay
- Château de Villacerf
- Hôtel Pierrard
- Place des Vosges
- Beuzeville-la-Guérard
- Château de Flaugergues

== Armorial ==
Figure	Blasonnement
	Arms of the Colbert family Or, with a waving snake in pale azure. Crown: of marquis. Supporter: two unicorns looking, natural. Motto: "Servat et Abstinet" (Keep and abstain).
	Antoine Martin Colbert de Seignelay (1659–1689); From Colbert, with a chief of gules charged with a cross of silver.
	François Édouard Henri René Colbert (1727–1748), Marquis de Maulévrier, Second lieutenant of the English gendarmes Quarterly: 1 and 4, azure, three silver fleurs-de-lis, a chief or ( d'Estaing); 2 and 3, argent, a saltire gules denched sable (de Froulay). Overall or, a serpent undulating in pale azure (Colbert). Supporter: two unicorns looking, natural.
	Jean-Baptiste Joachim Colbert (1703–1777), son of Jean-Baptiste Colbert, Marquis of Torcy (1665–1746), Lieutenant-General of the King's Armies, governor of Crécy-en-Brie and Captain of the Guards of the King's Gate

== See also ==
- Navarre monarchs family tree
- Guiraude de Dax
