= Siege of Kaiserswerth =

1702 siege

Siege of Kaiserswerth (1702)
- Part of the War of the Spanish Succession
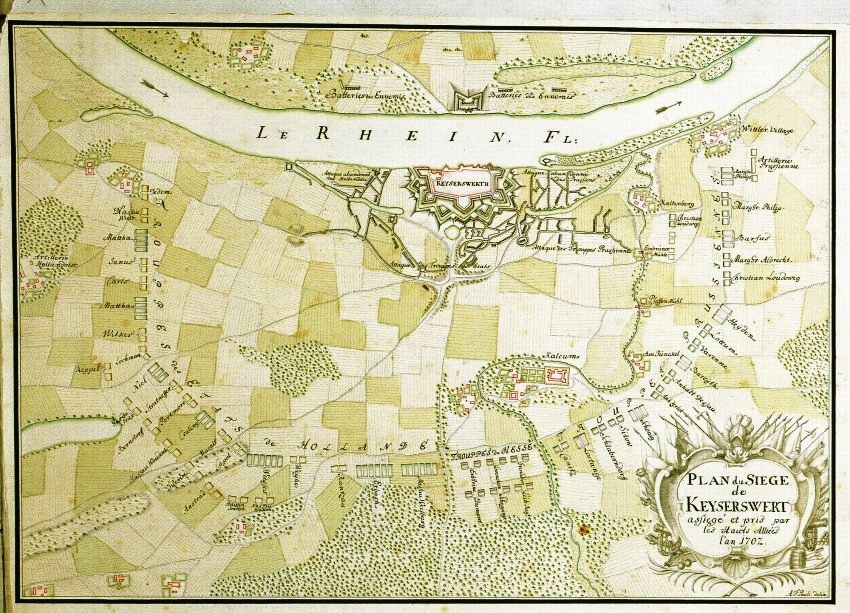
- The Allied siege plan
Date	18 April – 15 June 1702 (1 month and 4 weeks)
Location	Kaiserswerth, Germany 51.299°N 6.741°E
Result	Allied victory

Belligerents
Holy Roman Empire: Prussia; Dutch Republic	France

Commanders and leaders
(Dutch Republic) Walrad von Nassau-Usingen	(Kingdom of France) Marquis de Blainville

Strength
38,000 men 80 guns 59 mortars 6 howitzers 70 hand-mortars	5,000 men 30 artillery pieces and mortars

Casualties and losses
2,800–9,000 killed and wounded	350 killed and wounded

The siege of Kaiserswerth (18 April – 15 June 1702), was a siege of the War of the Spanish Succession. Prussian and Dutch troops numbering 38,000 men and 215 artillery pieces and mortars under the command of Imperial Field Marshal Walrad, Prince of Nassau-Usingen, besieged and captured the small French fortress on the Lower Rhine, which the French had occupied without resistance the previous year. The Dutch regarded the capture of this fortification as more important than an advance into the French-held Spanish Netherlands.

== Siege ==
Without the presence of the Dutch siege expert Menno van Coehoorn, the siege was time-consuming, poorly conducted and casualty-intensive. The Germans did not have enough gunpowder and shot available. They had little in the way of siege artillery and engineers and the Dutch supplied them to the Prussians. The advance of the Dutch siege lines was too fast for the Prussians and the heavy resistance of the garrison, the need to coordinate the advances, bad weather and the arrival of French troops under Camille d'Hostun, duc de Tallard on west bank of the Rhine forced the Dutch to repeatedly postpone the storming of the fortress throughout May. The trenches were opened on 18 April and the Dutch intended to take the counterscarp after one week, but the storm was launched only on 9 June.

The French commander of the fort Jean-Jules-Armand Colbert, Marquis de Blainville, informed Marshal Louis-François de Boufflers on 10 June that the Allied assault forces were cut down on the glacis like grass before the mower's scythe. The French engineer in charge of the fort's defenses was Vauban's assistant Louis Filley. The garrison capitulated on 15 June.

== Aftermath ==
It cost the Allies 2,800 killed and wounded on 9 June alone, of which 2,101 were Dutch, and 2 months to capture a place that Vauban had called a "hole". Bodart estimates Allied losses at 9,000. After its capitulation, the French garrison was allowed to march out to freedom with full military honours.
