= Nicolas-Hubert de Mongault =

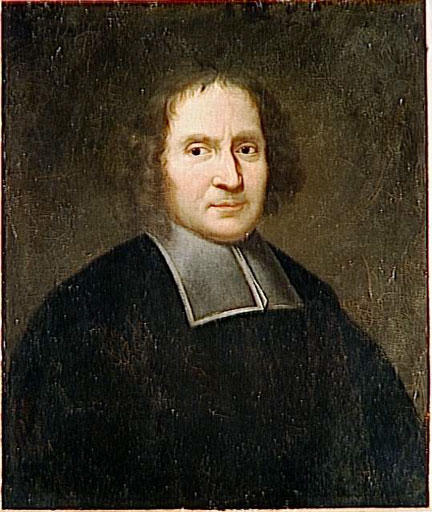
Nicolas-Hubert Mongault

Nicolas-Hubert Mongault (6 October 1674 – 11 August 1746, Paris) was a French ecclesiastic and translator of the classics. He was an illegitimate son of Gilbert Colbert, Marquis de Saint-Pouange, a cousin of Louis XIV's powerful minister Jean-Baptiste Colbert.
