= Édouard Colbert, Marquis of Villacerf =

Superintendent of building for Louis XIV

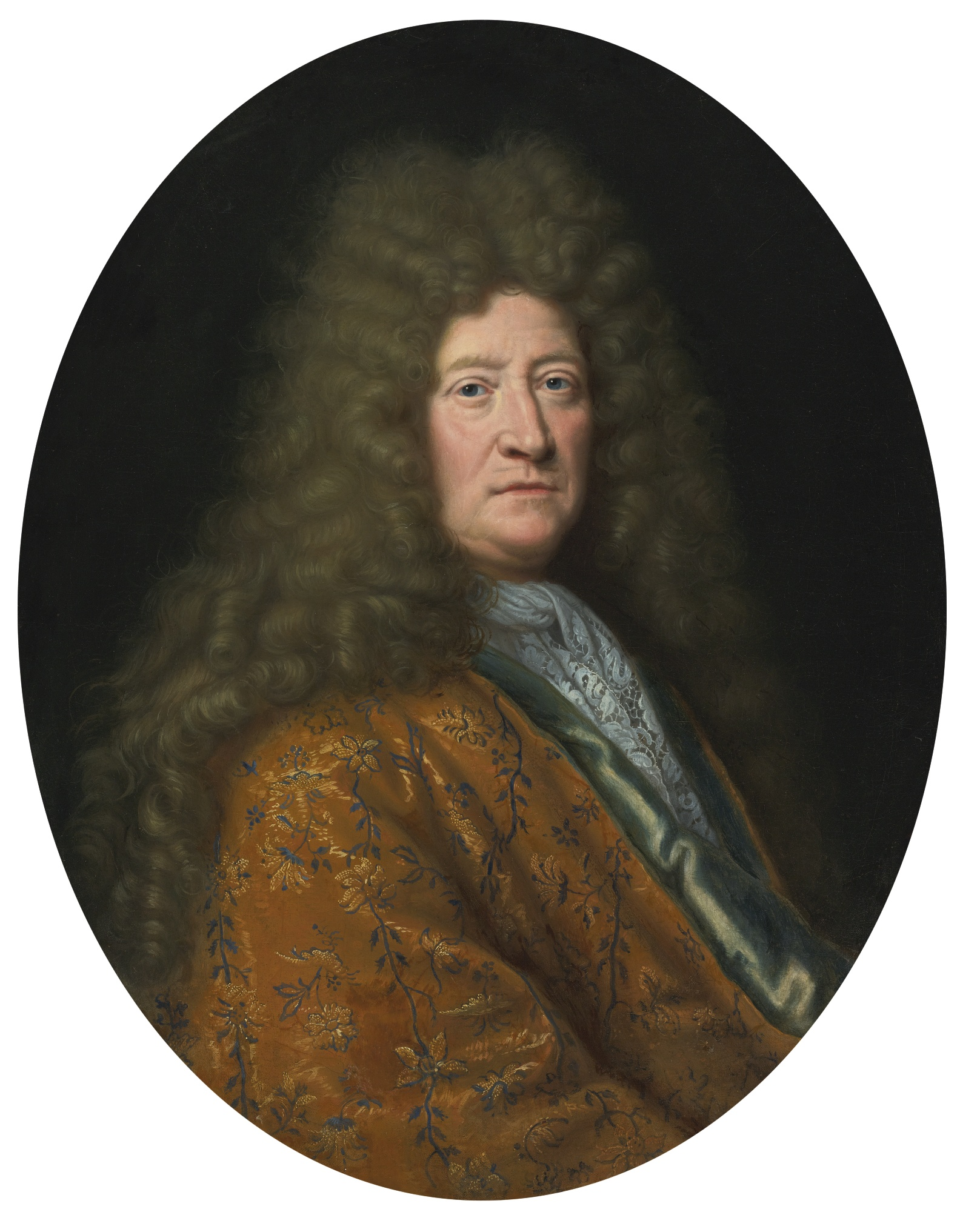
Portrait of Edouard Colbert

Édouard Colbert, Marquis of Villacerf (born 1628; died in Paris on 17 October 1699) was a senior official in the government of Louis XIV.

== Life ==
He was the cousin of both Jean-Baptiste Colbert and Michel Le Tellier, son of Jean Baptiste Colbert, seigneur of Saint-Pouange and Claude Le Tellier, he entered the offices of the latter and served as the first war clerk. First maitre d'hotel to the queen, he was also court man and familiar with Louis XIV. In 1686, he received the appointment of general inspector of buildings from the king, which made him deputy to Louvois in the superintendence of buildings. On the death of Louvois, Villacerf took his succession as Superintendent of Buildings on July 28, 1691, but held this office only by commission and not ex officio. He had married Geneviève Larcher, from whom he had, among others, Charles-Maurice Colbert, known as the Abbé de Villacerf, General Agent of the Clergy of France.
