= French forestry ordinance of 1669 =

17th century forest law

The Forestry Ordinance of 1669 (“sur le fait des Eaux et Forêts") proclaimed by Louis XIV of France sought to protect and restore France’s timber resources as well as its considerable forestry heritage. The Ordinance consolidated and clarified older, more fragmented regulations. It was drafted after serious investigation of forestry exploitation practices by Jean-Baptiste Colbert, who successfully championed the idea of systematic reform. The Ordinance specified the skills of royal officers, imposed a uniform mode of forest exploitation and sought to steer forest exploitation toward what would today be called “sustainable” practices. This major reform also reflected a long-term strategy to protect forestry resources at a time when wood was not only the primary construction material (including its all important role in maritime construction), but also the primary source of energy for households and industry. Today's forest codes in France and in many other countries are direct heirs of this ordinance.

== History ==
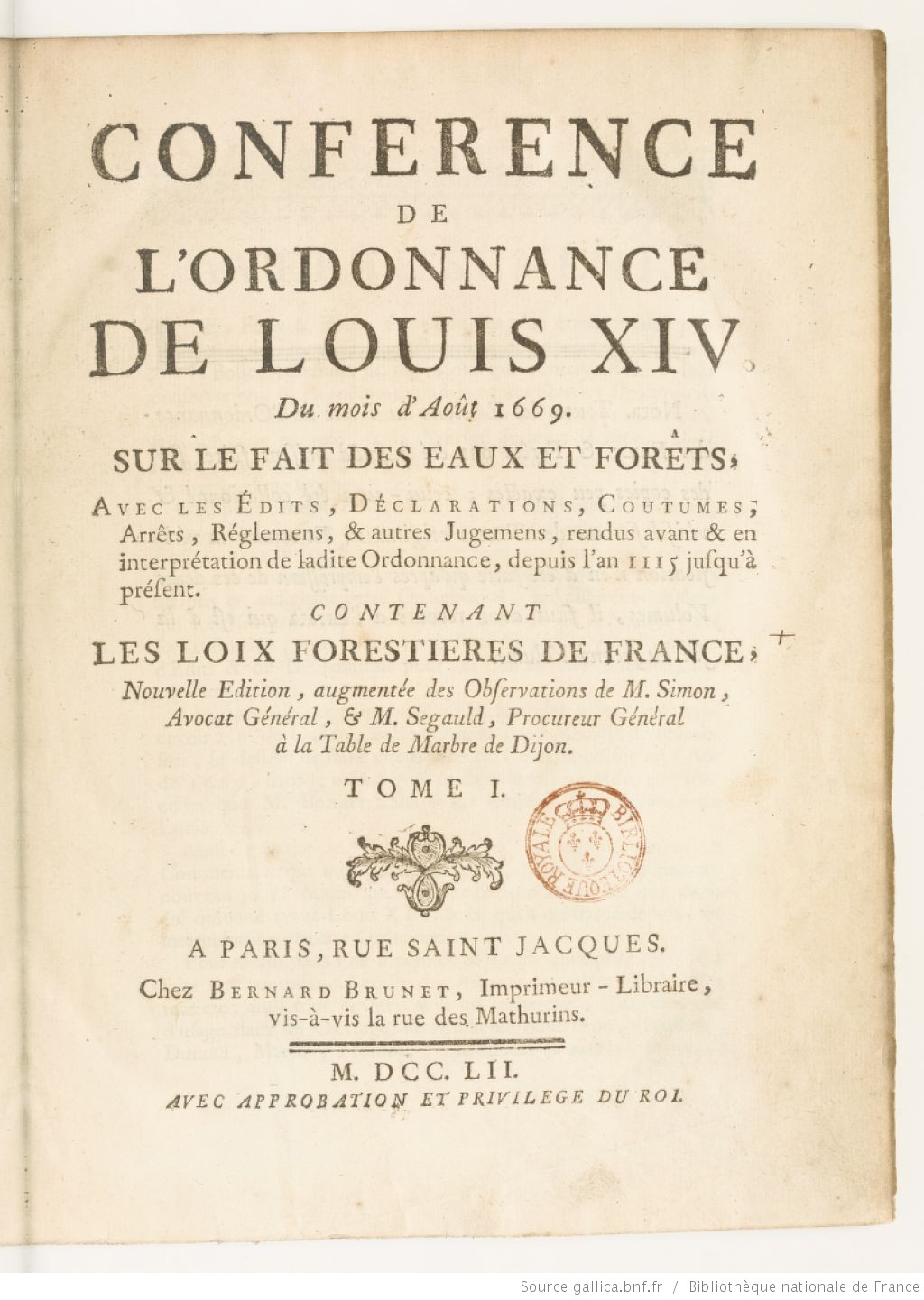
Conference on the Ordinance of Louis XIV on Eaux et Forêt; published in 1752 with the approbation of the King

Noting that "the disorder which had crept into the Waters and Forests of our kingdom was so universal and so inveterate that the remedy seemed almost impossible", Louis XIV promulgated an ordinance that was to become a landmark in the history of forestry. However, the Ordinance of 1669 was part of a broader campaign of forestry reform under Louis XIV that lasted from 1661 to 1680. Colbert provided the knowledge and the impetus for this reform effort, but Louis XIV provided his wholehearted support.

=== The deplorable state of French forests in the first half of the 17th century ===
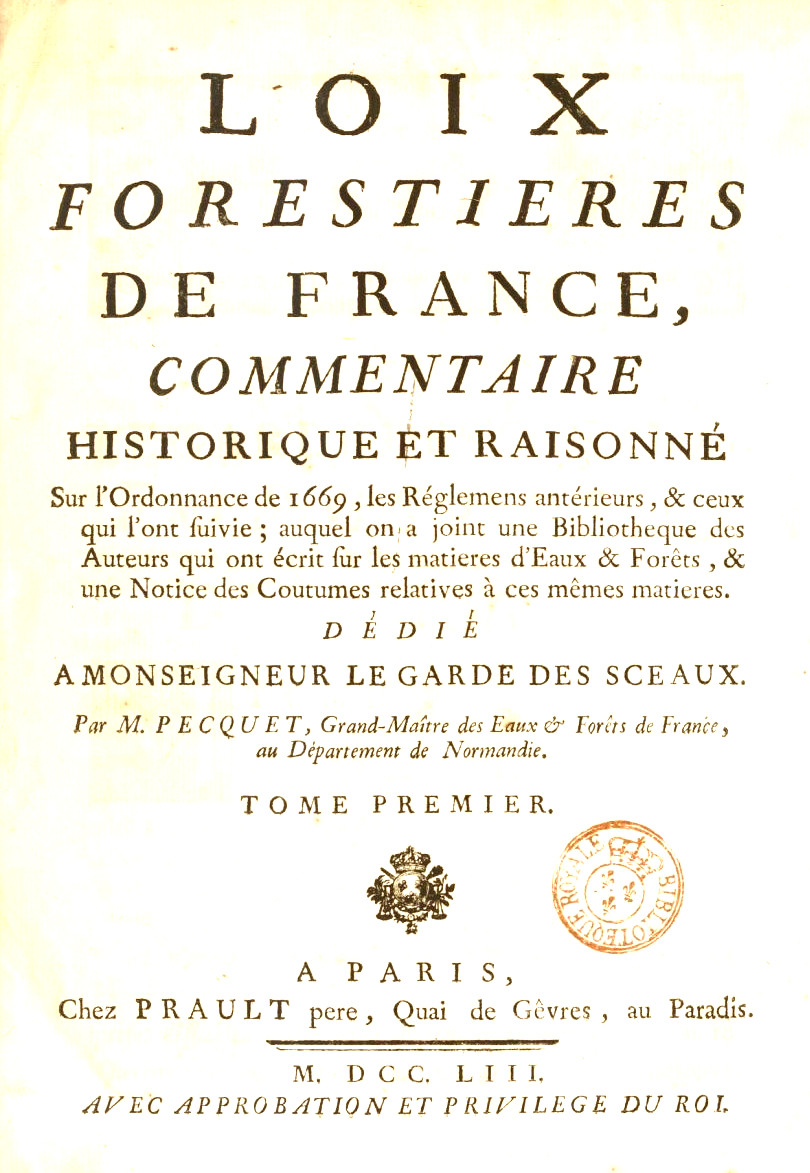
Historical and analytical commentary on the Ordinance of 1669, by M. Pecquet; published in 1753 with the approbation of the King

French forests were beset by numerous problems in the first half of the 17th century. These problems had been a long time in the making. From the 13th century onwards, political powers had attempted to put some order in the rampant exploitation of forest resources for fuel and building materials.^{:11-12} However, these efforts had shown over the centuries that they were not up to the task of dealing with the tragedy of the forest commons.

By the mid-17th century, the urgent need for reform was clear from the extreme disorder of the administration of royal property after the long period of the Wars of Religion and the Huguenot Rebellions. Colbert, as Minister of Louis XIV, exclaimed: "France will perish for lack of wood!"^{:13}

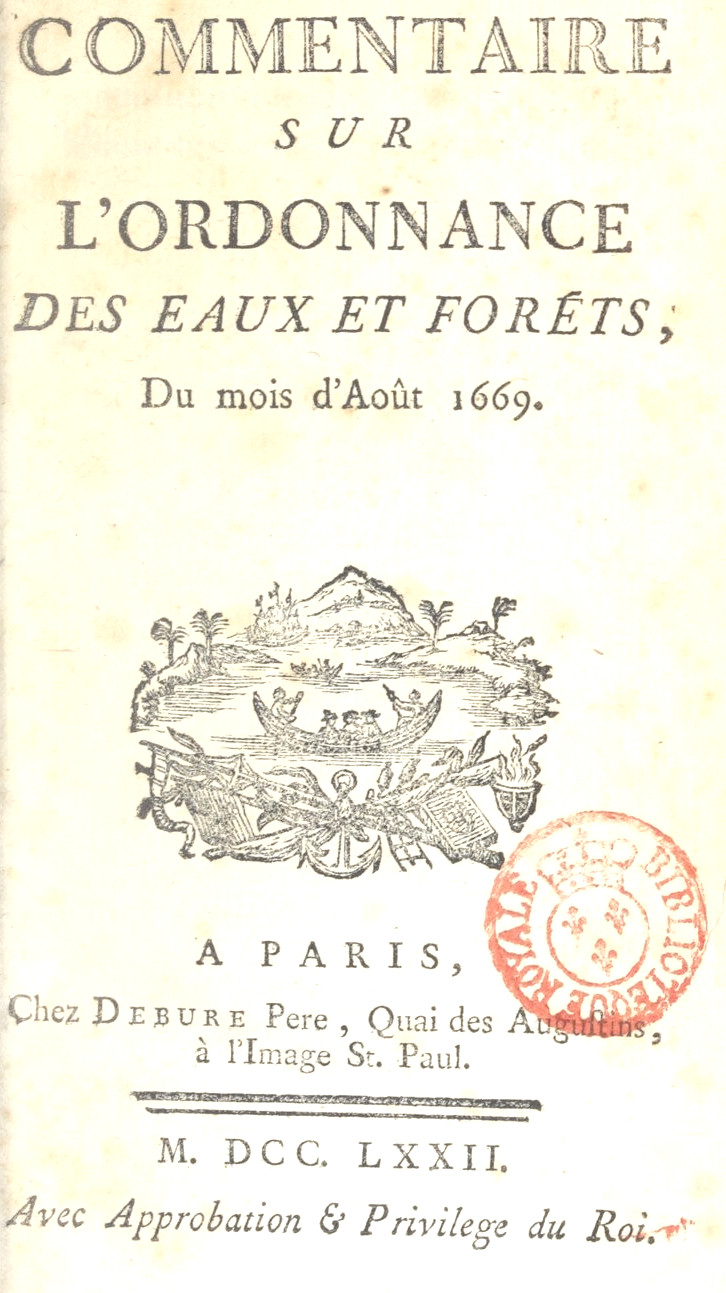
Commentary on the Ordinance on Eaux et Forêts of 1669; published in 1772 with the approbation of the King

Indeed, war and civil strife had taken their toll on the forests themselves and on the administrative structure that was supposed to manage them. As in other areas of service to the King,^{:22} many of the commissioners and other forestry officials engaged in self-dealing and embezzlement.^{:15-26} Often they were not well qualified or not motivated to do their jobs. Indeed, the "ignorance of forest officers, the constant need for money from the Treasury, and embezzlement had led to enormous waste and inconsiderate sales of wood. "^{:291} As a result, little of the forestry revenues that should have accrued to the Treasury actually ended up there and often the forests were a drain on royal coffers.^{:30-37}

In addition, the system of rights enjoyed by the various users of forest resources (nobles, ecclesiastics, commoners and towns) was not well documented – nobles or ecclesiastics would usurp royal rights by encroaching on the King’s land or exploiting his resources;^{:16-20} users of the forest would buy exploitation rights from people who did not in fact own them; and many users – particularly the noble and ecclesiastical elites –would simply exploit the forest in ways that were detrimental to it (e.g. excessive grazing of animals, building kilns for firing bricks using the forest's wood as an energy source). As a result, France was being rapidly deforested. Of particular concern to Colbert and Louis XIV was that, for ship building, France was forced to rely on masts imported from the Netherlands or from nordic countries, leaving it vulnerable to blockades.^{:79}

=== Colbert takes control of forestry policy ===
Colbert was the main instigator and drafter of the Ordinance, with the approval and encouragement of Louis XIV.^{:87} While overseeing the forestry holdings of Cardinal Mazarin as his Intendant, Colbert had obtained insights into the problems of forestry management. Thus, he was well positioned to deal with these issues before being named Intendant of Finance in 1661. Forestry reform was one of many other projects that Colbert would launch as first steps in the transition to the modern French state. Indeed, Colbert and the King XIV were well aware that the self-dealing of officers of the Crown and the usurping of royal rights by the nobility were broader problems that extended well beyond forestry and they sought to address these problems.^{:22}

In late 1661, Colbert's first step in forestry reform was to take stock of the situation – he initially ordered the grands maîtres (the top officials in charge of forestry management) to report on the size of the forests for which they were responsible, the distribution and composition of species of trees and the type of forest exploitation that was taking place. He also asked for a list of harvests^{:23} and sales of forest products from 1635 to 1661.^{:87} Also inventoried were local residents' rights as well as abuses, usurpations and crimes committed in France’s forests. All of this reporting was to be finished in only a few months (by January 1662). The initial reports were disappointing. Some of the Grands Maîtres failed to submit reports and others proved to be of little use. Often, the officials faced hostility from the local elites.

After several attempts, Colbert managed to compile reliable information about the state of many forests, principally by constituting a team of trusted commissioners. On the 10th of March 1663, Colbert issued detailed instructions on how the commissioners or 'maîtres de requetes" were to carry out their investigative mission. He begins by itemising a detailed list of the corruption and shortcomings of earlier commissioners. He then warns his commissioners to be on their guard against all previous officials, given the long tradition of abuses in the sector.^{:25}

The Reformation was implemented by stewards, as well as a small number of forestry Commissioners like Louis de Froidour who initially made himself known in the reformation of the forests of Île-de-France and was then made responsible for that of the department of Languedoc, to which all the Pyrenees, Quercy and Angoumois were later to be added.^{:137} These officials collected information from archives of legal documents, interviews of local people and from forest visits where measurements were taken and assessments of abuses made. Their reports provided both information and proposals that would be used later during the drafting of the Ordinance of 1669. One analysis asserts that these reports by Commissioners may also have exaggerated the misdeeds of earlier forest gardiens so as to justify their existence and mission and in order to justify the State's interference in this key area of local life.

Colbert's information gathering efforts also resulted in the imposition of disciplines and punishments on the corp of royal officials charged with implementing forestry policy. Indeed, "never before had royal forest policy been implemented with such exactitude and serverity." In November 1662, he instructed the Commissioner of Ile-de-France to "execute justice, spare no one, fear nothing .. it is necessary to bring the greatest severity to those who have committed depredations in the forests."^{:27} Some of the delinquent forest officials were dismissed and others were punished. In one case, a sergeant in the forest of Alençon had been condemned to the galleys (forced labour). Colbert wrote: "His punishment will serve as an example; and it will be well that you give, if you please, the order for his being taken to La Toulon with the first chain."^{:27}

Officials and others were also fined and required to disgorge ill-gotten gains.^{:31} By the end of this reform, the Crown had recovered more than 70,000 acres of wood and the amount of fines exceeded 2 million pounds.

== The Ordinance ==
Between 1215 and 1611, 18 Forest Ordinances were issued by royal decree.^{:52} These earlier attempts at regulation of forests were not successful and, indeed, were a subject of widespread mockery, but they also meant that Colbert was not starting from a blank slate when he began drafting the Ordinance of 1669. This Ordinance consists of 32 Titles which are themselves divided into several hundred Articles.

The Ordinance first defines "the Jurisdiction of Waters & Forests" — it governed the Kingdom's Waters and Forests, including hunting, fishing and water policing and, in addition to royal forests, it covered ecclesiastical forests, those owned by the nobility, and those belonging towns. All of these were to be governed by rules and administrative and legal structures put in place by the King.

Broadly speaking, the Ordinance defines the rights and responsibilities of different actors in the forest system; creates a cadre of royal officials with defined roles; and sets rules for avoidance of conflict of interest and punishments for officials who are remiss in their duties. The highest ranking personnel were the Grand Masters (Title III^{:69-76}), who were qualified officers whose role was to oversee the execution of the Ordinance and the conduct of the lower officers (Title II^{:66} ^{68}) -Masters, Lieutenants, Attorneys, Gardes-Marteau (keeper of the stamping hammers used in martelage, which defines forest boundaries, windthrows and stolen trees and trees for sale; only this official was to have access to this hammer; Title VII) and Greffiers (who kept copies of documents and decrees, took minutes of meetings and forest visits and accounts of wood harvests, sales auctions and other events; Title VIII) These lower officers were organised in a pyramidal structure under the Grand Master and were subject to several constraints: 1) they had to be at least 25 years of age: 2) they could not have family relationships any closer than first cousins with other forest officers; and 3) most were not allowed to hold other royal positions.^{:66-67}

The Ordinance also regulates the major processes of forest exploitation: the sale, felling and martelage of trees (Title XV; this provides detailed instructions on record keeping, avoidance of conflict of interest, due care by forest officials); the sale of windthrows (uprooted trees; Title XVII); the sale of rights to the glandée (the use of the fruits of some trees, especially oak, as animal feed; Title XVIII); the organisation of pasturing of cattle and pigs (Title XIX); wood used for heating and construction (Title XX); the provision of building timber for royal mansions and the Navy (Title XXI). Titles XXIV imposes what would now be called a "sustainable" system of logging. Under this system, large forests were divided into compartments, which each compartment being subjected to successive clear cuts (except that 16 trees were to be left standing to reseed). By the end of the cycle of successive logging of parcels, the first parcel would be ready to be logged again.^{:45-47} In addition, in communal and ecclesiastical forests, one fourth of the land area was to be reserved for timber trees (Titles XXIV and XXV).

The last five titles are: the “Police and Conservation of Forests, Waters & Rivers”, “Roads and Chemins Royals és Forests & marshes of Rivers”, followed by two Titles -- “Des Chasses” (Title XXX, Hunting, which broadly preserves royal and noble prerogatives regarding hunting of forest animals) and “De la Pesche” (Title XXXI, Fishing). The final Title is devoted to “Penalties, fines, restitution, damages, interests, & confiscations”. Title XXXII provides inter alia for penalties and punishments for crimes committed by forest officials: "Officers who have been convicted of forgery or fraud are to be condemned to pay quadruple, be deprived of their offices, banished from the forests and subjected to corporal punishment ... the Guards who shall have made the [fraudulent] reports shall be sent to the galleys for life, without any moderation."^{:179} Many other offences under the Ordinance were punishable by fines. Culprits found guilty of depredations were liable for both fines and restitution, with the latter being greater than or equal to the fine. The fine was paid to the royal Treasury, while the restitution accrued to the possessor of the forest (the King or some other right holder). If the possessor was a community, it was required to spend the restitution money on public works in the forest or elsewhere.^{:55.} The death penalty could be imposed for serious offenses.

The principal judicial structure charged with adjudicating disputes or judging violations had 3 levels: a lower court (Gruries); an intermediate forum (the Master or Maîtres) and, finally, the highest court (the Courts of the Marble Table^{:54}). For some types of offense (e.g. appeals by the Grand Masters themselves or by officials of the Marble Tables), Parliament could serve as an appeals body (Titles XIII and XIV).

== Legacy ==
An administrative monument of the Ancien Régime, the 1669 Ordinance now serves as the basis for France's current Forest Code and those of other countries as well. An analysis of French forestry policy by the European Forestry Institute credits the Ordinance with being "the first real forestry code." It goes on to say: "This code unified the law, regulated practices and defined the rules of forest management. Known as the 'amènagement forestier', this code has ever since determined the management plan of the forest. This forest management became a model throughout Europe."

However, the Ordinance presented serious shortcomings as a general framework for forest management in France. Although its regulations of were ideal for oak silviculture, they were unsuitable for stands of conifers which do not sprout on stumps. For this reason, in the years following the enactment of the Ordinance, hundreds of supplementary statutes were issued. Some of these were designed to remedy the Ordinance's shortcomings with respect to non-deciduous trees. Subsequent legislation and local adaptations to the law managed to alleviate, "but did not eliminate, the damaging effects of technical deficiencies in the law."^{:99}
