= Château de Creully =

11-12th century castle in Cruelly, France

Coordinates: 49°17′11″N 0°32′24″W

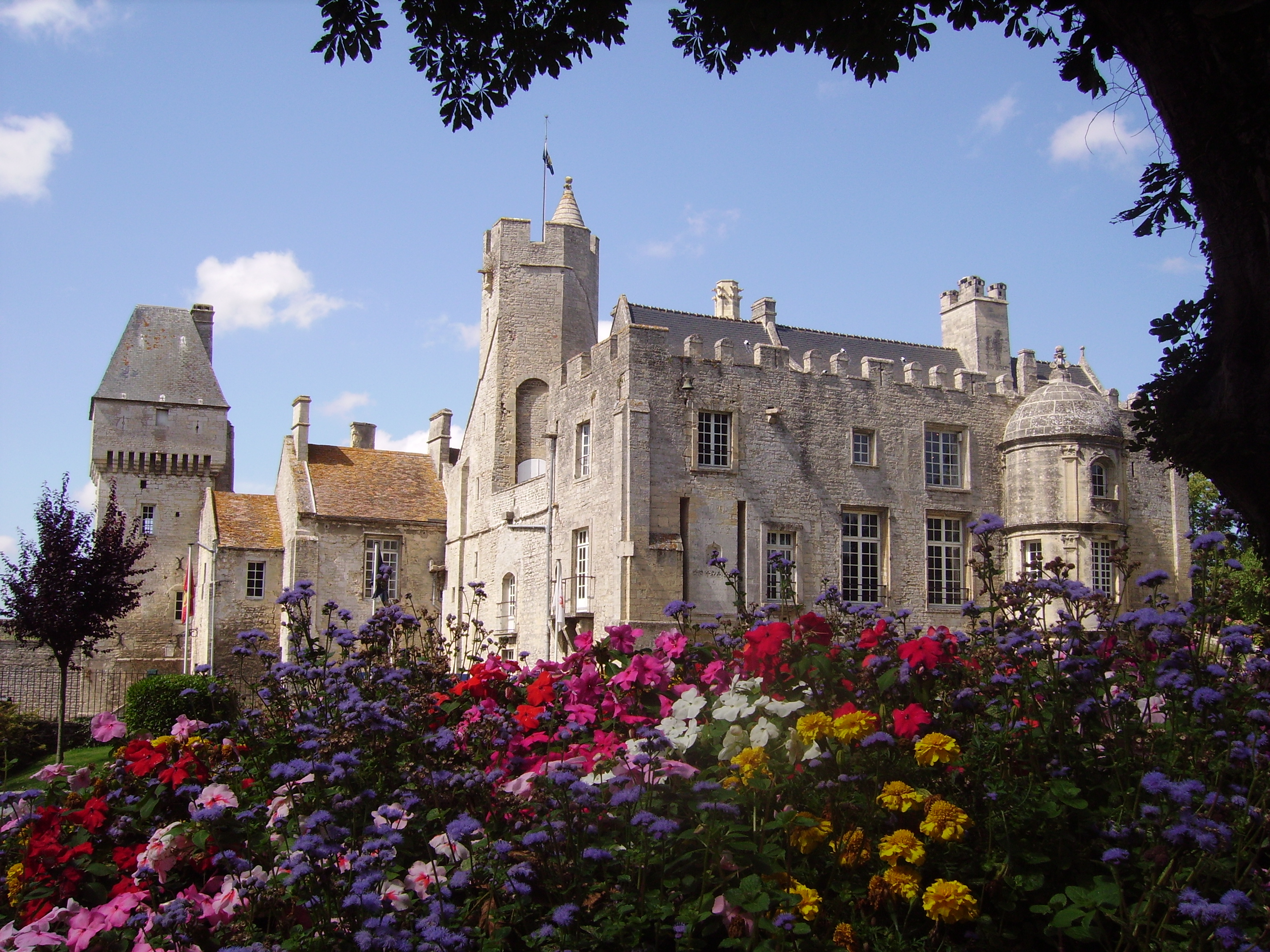

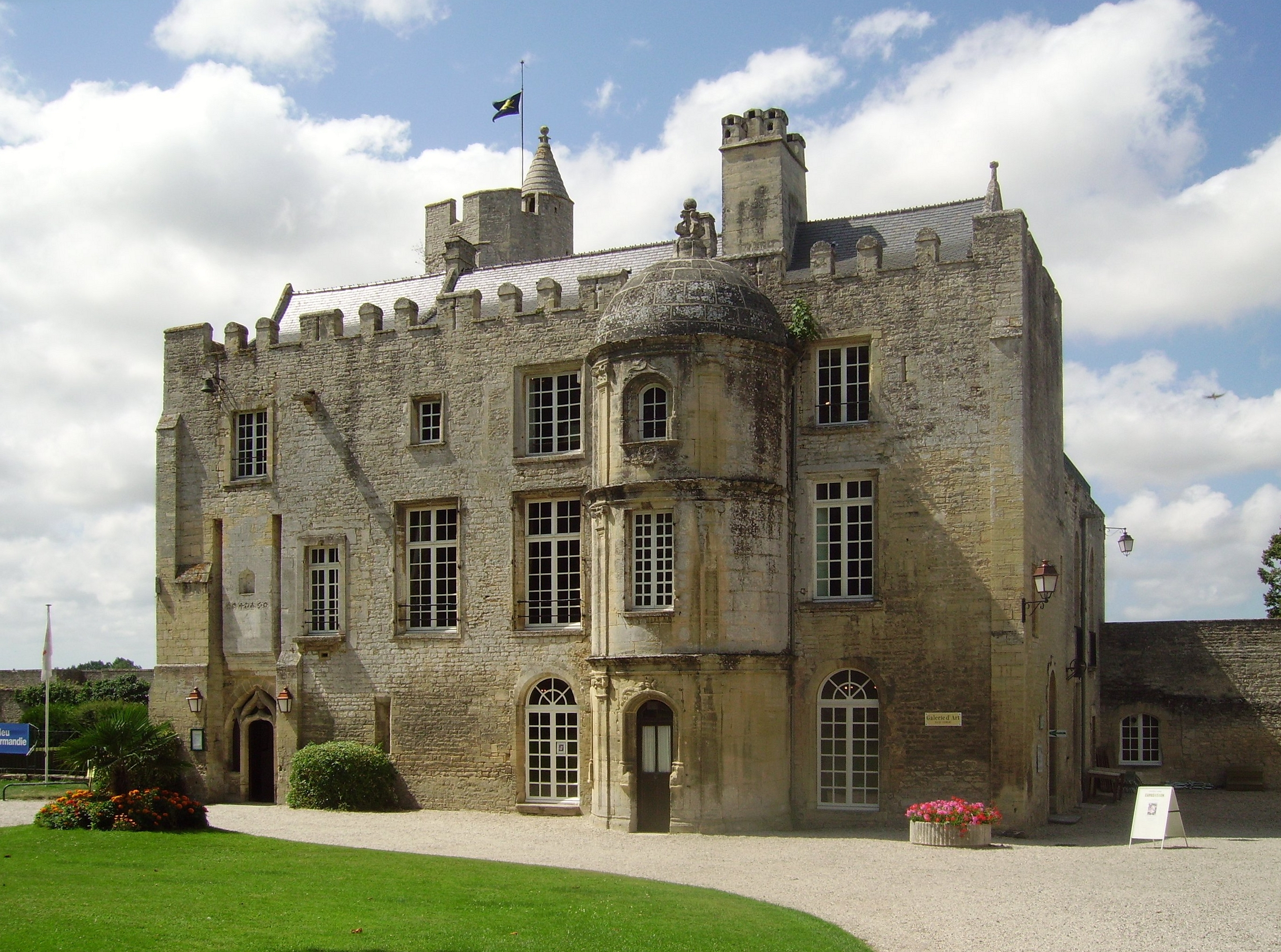

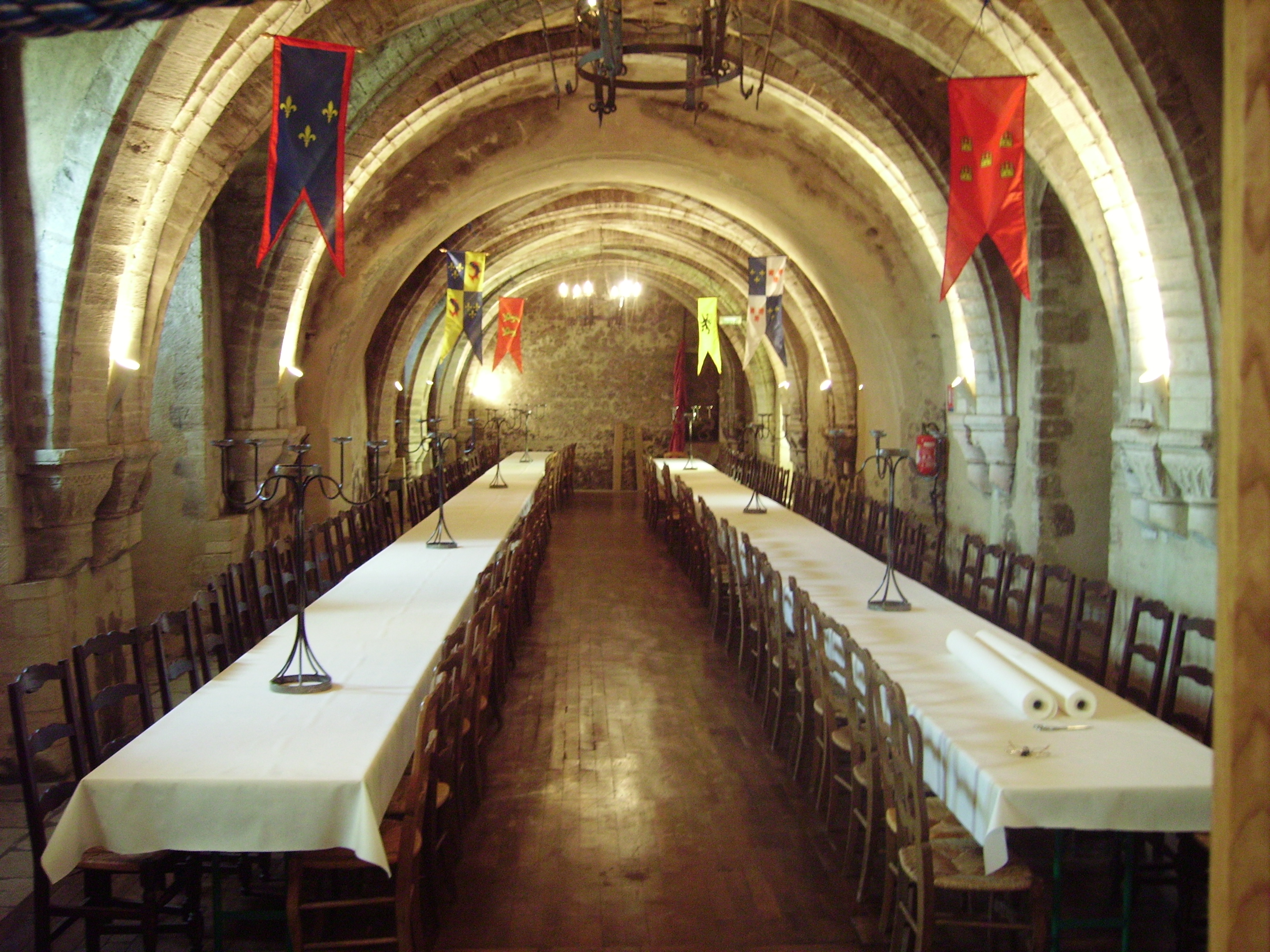

The Château de Creully is an 11th- and 12th-century castle, much altered over the years, located in the town of Creully in the Calvados département of France.

== History ==
The castle has been modified throughout its history. Around 1050, it did not resemble a defensive fortress but a large agricultural domain. In about 1360, with the Hundred Years War, it was modified into a fortress. During this period, its architecture was demolished and reconstructed with each occupation by the English and the French:

- The square tower was built in the 14th century
- A watchtower was added in the 15th century
- Drawbridge in front of the keep (removed later in 16th century)
- Fortification of the walls and demolition of other buildings likely to pose a danger to besieged inhabitants (stables, depots, outside kitchens).

With the end of the war (1453), ownership of the castle returned to baron de Creully. It was demolished on the orders of Louis XI in 1461 through plain jealousy. According to legend, When Louis XI passed through Creully in 1471 he authorised its rebuilding to thank the local people for their warm welcome.

In the 16th and 17th centuries, the barons made modifications:

- Filling of the interior ditch and destruction of the drawbridge
- Construction of a Renaissance style turret and large windows
- Outbuildings, originally stables, added in 17th

Twenty two barons of the same family had succeeded to the castle between 1035 and 1682. In 1682, the last baron of Creully, Antoine V de Sillans, heavily indebted, sold the castle to Jean-Baptiste Colbert, minister of Louis XIV, who died the following year without living there. Descendants of Colbert occupied Creully until the French Revolution in 1789, when it was confiscated and sold to various rich landowners.

In 1946, the commune of Creully became the owner of part of the site. The castle's large halls are used today for various events, including weddings, concerts, exhibitions and conferences.

The site is classified as a monument historique.

== Second World War ==
From 7 June 1944, the day after D-Day, until 21 July, the square tower housed BBC war correspondents and their radio studio, where the first news of the Battle of Normandy was transmitted. From 8 June to 2 August 1944, Field Marshal Montgomery had his tactical headquarters at the nearby château de Creullet. Prime Minister Winston Churchill visited him there.

== See also ==
List of castles in France

== Bibliography ==
- Impey, E Le Château de Creully
- Vigoureux, J J La Baronnie de Creully
