= Château de Flaugergues =

Castle in Montpellier, Occitania, France

Coordinates: 43°36′37″N 3°55′12″E

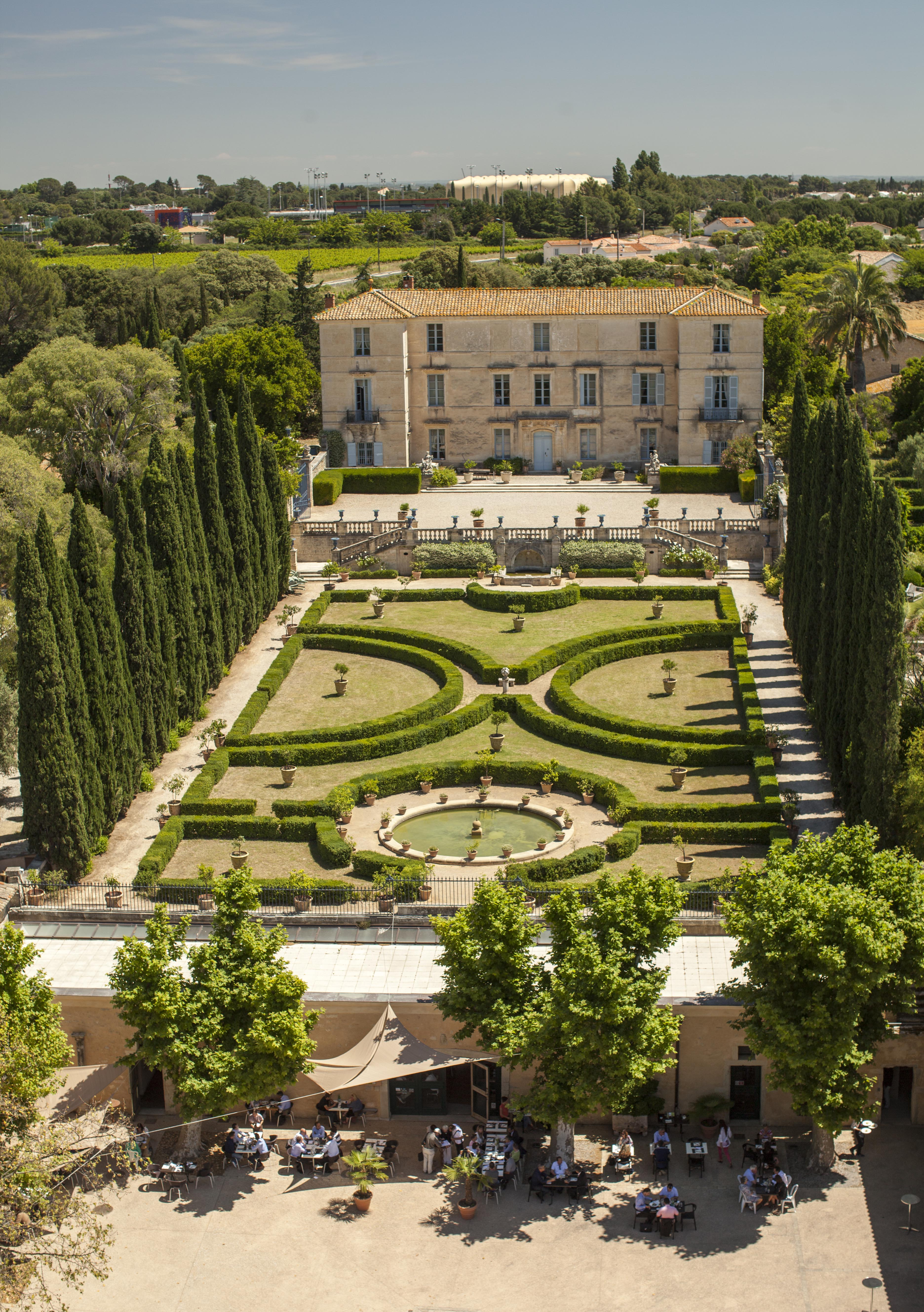
- Interactive map of Château de Flaugergues
- Type: Castle
- Location: Montpellier

History
- Built: Mostly 1696–1705

Site notes
- Area: Occitanie
- Architectural style: 17th century architecture with other later styles
- Owner: count and countess of Colbert

Located on the territory of the French city of Montpellier close to the Mediterranean Sea, the château de Flaugergues is a "Folie of Montpellier" built in 1696. Listed as a Monument historique, it now belongs to the count and countess of Colbert. It is the center of a winery and can be visited all year round.

== History ==
The folies in the region were constructed by members of the local gentry at the end of the 17th century and during the 18th century. In 1696, Etienne de Flaugergues, a magistrate and member of the local financial Court, bought a piece of land and built the mansion which henceforth carried his name. It took him 45 years to give the castle its current appearance. From then on, Flaugergues became an example for the various other folies constructed by noble families around the city of Montpellier.

In 1811, the Boussairolles family inherited the estate, and the baron Charles Joseph de Boussairoles designed the orangerie and the park in English garden style in 1850. Passed down over ten generations, it still gives an idea of the life of the French nobility from the 17th to the 21st century.

The castle, the gardens, the wineyard, the archives and the furniture are listed Monument historique since 1986.

== Architecture ==
It is not so much the building itself as the use that is made of the area surrounding it that makes Flaugergues interesting architecturally speaking. The architect is not known, but it is certain that multiple people worked on the estate between 1696 and 1730. Much use is made of the difference in terrain level, creating separate spaces within the garden, and making the mansion look grander than it in fact is.

The façade is cut in half by a doorway with Doric pilasters, carrying an entablature with rose sculpted metopes. The different levels of the house are emphasized by bands, which was fashionable in the 17th century. The large windows give the first level an air of importance, while the back wall of the building is almost blind.

Staircase at chateau de flaugergues, Montpellier, France

The most striking part of Flaugergues is the interior, with the staircase taking up almost one-third of it. Every floor is served by this staircase with its characteristic hanging key vaults and wrought iron banisters.

== Interiors and furniture ==
In the staircase is displayed a serie of tapestries from Flanders made in 1670 depicting scenes from the life of Moses.

The salons are furnished with Louis XV and Louis XVI style furniture, family portraits and an important collection of porcelain and faience and include a zograscope, an optical box in Louis XV style.

The library houses a series of ancient scientific instruments.

The Eagle’s room features an exceptional mural decoration on the theme of the Campaign of Egypt created in 1990 by the artist Diane de Montbron.

== Wine ==
Since Roman times, vines have been grown on that place. A descendant of Jean-Baptiste Colbert's family now produces the Flaugergues wine. It is part of the Mejanelle, one of the twelve terroirs of the Coteaux du Languedoc AOC.
