= Villacerf =

Commune in Grand Est, France

- Commune
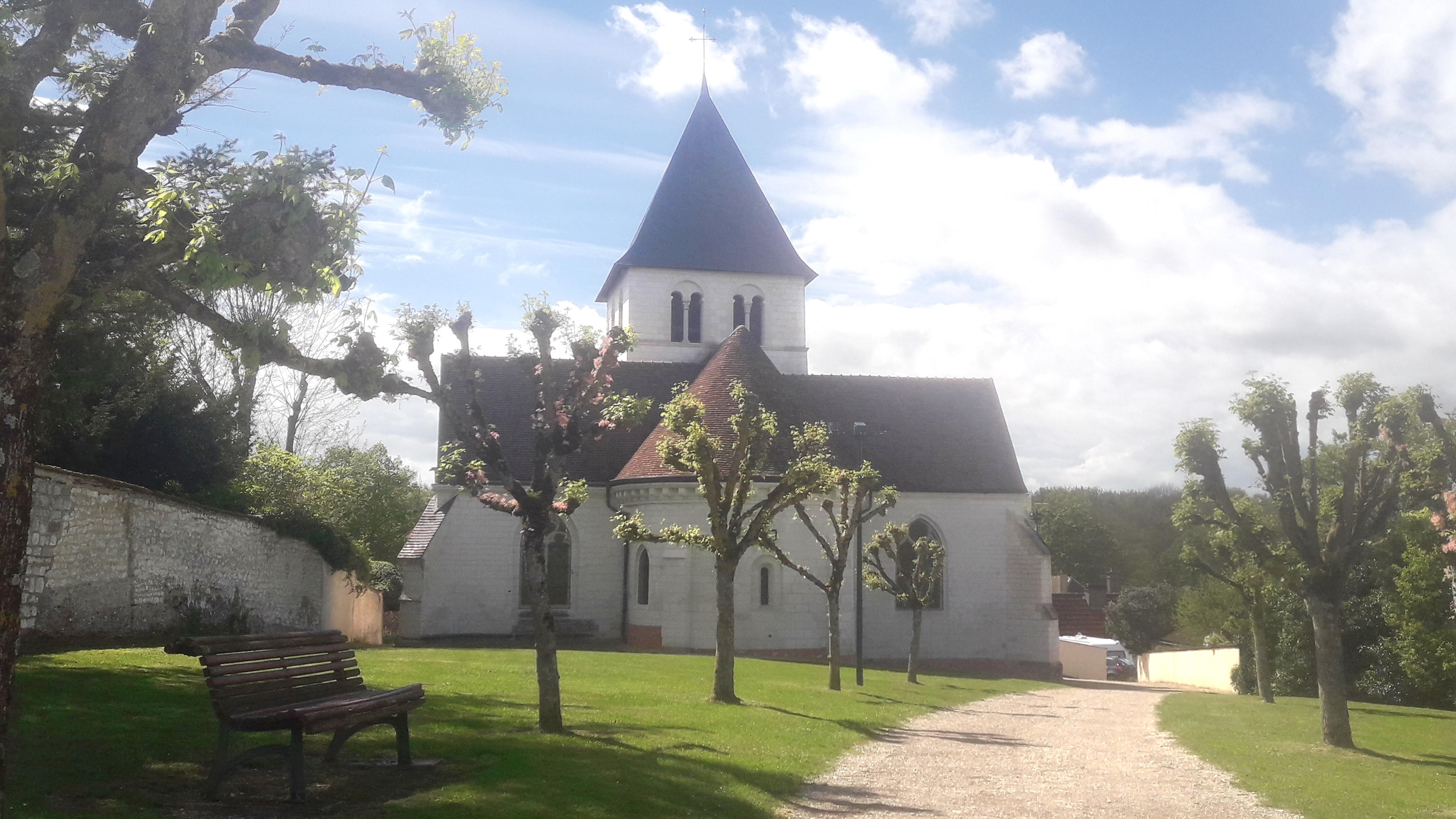
- The church in Villacerf
- Location of Villacerf
- Location within France Location within Grand Est
- Coordinates: 48°23′59″N 3°59′30″E
- Country: France
- Region: Grand Est
- Department: Aube
- Arrondissement: Troyes
- Canton: Creney-près-Troyes
- Intercommunality: CA Troyes Champagne Métropole

Government
  - Mayor (2020–2026): Kevin Poivez
- Area^{1}: 9.64 km^{2} (3.72 sq mi)
- Elevation: 105 m (344 ft)
- Highest elevation: 191 m (627 ft)
- Lowest elevation: 88 m (289 ft)
- Population (2023): 598
  - Density: 62.0/km^{2} (161/sq mi)
- Time zone: UTC+01:00 (CET)
  - Summer (DST): UTC+02:00 (CEST)
- INSEE/Postal code: 10409 /10600
- ^{1} French Land Register data, which excludes lakes, ponds, glaciers > 1 km^{2} (0.386 sq mi or 247 acres) and river estuaries.

Villacerf is a commune in the Aube department in north-central France.

Site : https://villacerf.fr/

== Population ==
Historical population
Year	Pop.	±% p.a.
1968	279	—
1975	300	+1.04%
1982	384	+3.59%
1990	390	+0.19%
1999	421	+0.85%
2007	484	+1.76%
2012	551	+2.63%
2017	589	+1.34%
2023	598	+0.25%
Source: INSEE

== See also ==
- Communes of the Aube department
