= Beuzeville-la-Guérard =

- Commune
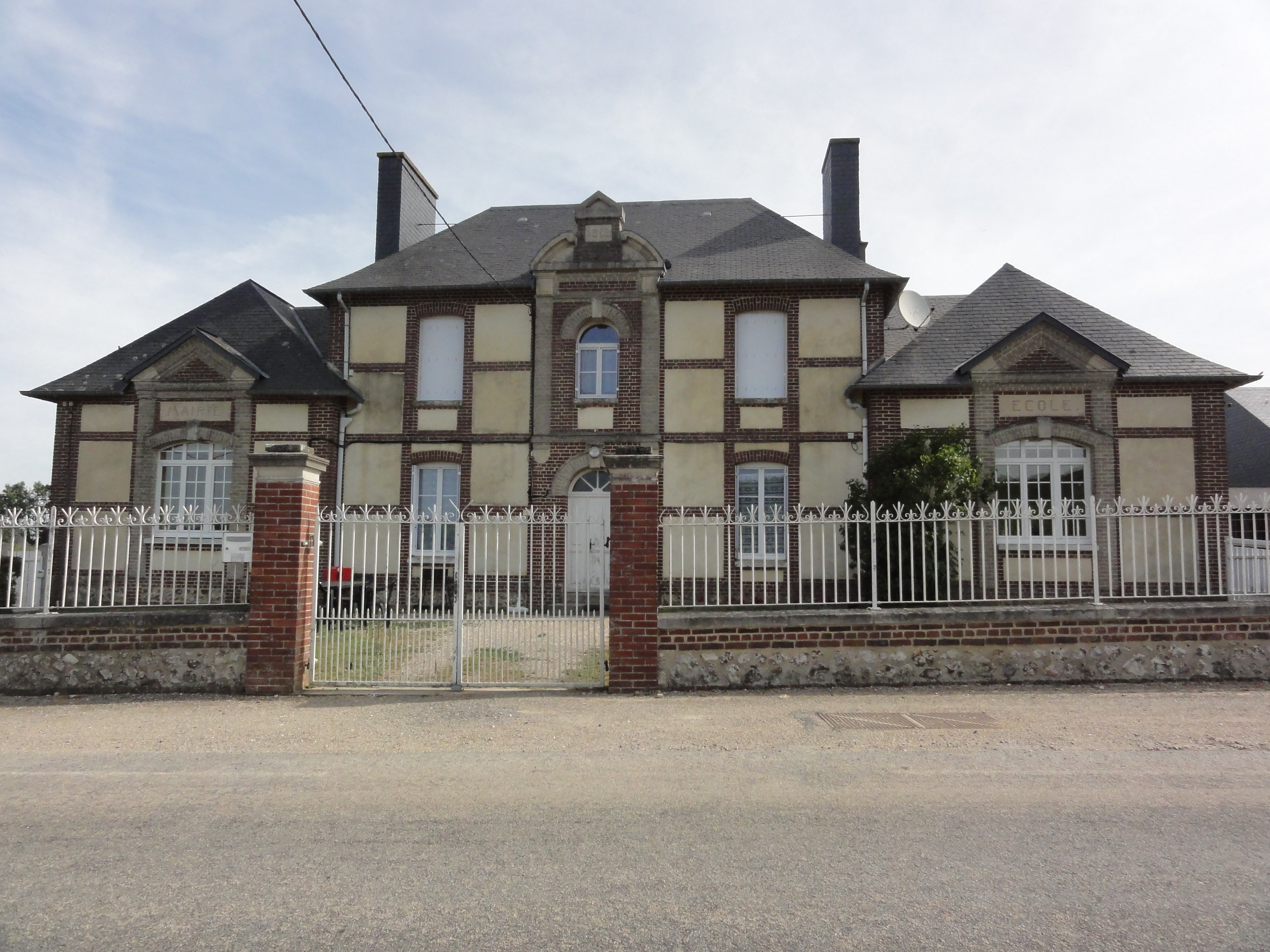
- Town hall
- Location of Beuzeville-la-Guérard
- Location within France Location within Normandy
- Coordinates: 49°42′52″N 0°37′12″E
- Country: France
- Region: Normandy
- Department: Seine-Maritime
- Arrondissement: Dieppe
- Canton: Saint-Valery-en-Caux
- Intercommunality: CC Côte d'Albâtre

Government
  - Mayor (2020–2026): Luc Bréant
- Area^{1}: 6.42 km^{2} (2.48 sq mi)
- Elevation: 110 m (360 ft)
- Highest elevation: 144 m (472 ft)
- Lowest elevation: 106 m (348 ft)
- Population (2023): 237
  - Density: 36.9/km^{2} (95.6/sq mi)
- Time zone: UTC+01:00 (CET)
  - Summer (DST): UTC+02:00 (CEST)
- INSEE/Postal code: 76091 /76450
- ^{1} French Land Register data, which excludes lakes, ponds, glaciers > 1 km^{2} (0.386 sq mi or 247 acres) and river estuaries.

Beuzeville-la-Guérard (French pronunciation: [bøzvil la ɡeʁaʁ]) is a commune in the Seine-Maritime department in the Normandy region in northern France.

== Geography ==
A small farming village situated in the Pays de Caux, some 25 miles (40 km) northeast of Le Havre, at the junction of the D5, D50 and the D306 roads.

== Population ==
Historical population
Year	Pop.	±% p.a.
1968	180	—
1975	139	−3.63%
1982	152	+1.29%
1990	147	−0.42%
1999	150	+0.22%
2007	165	+1.20%
2012	196	+3.50%
2017	225	+2.80%
2023	237	+0.87%
Source: INSEE

== Places of interest ==
- The church of Notre-Dame, dating from the eleventh century.
- A manorhouse and a farmhouse from the sixteenth century.

== See also ==
- Communes of the Seine-Maritime department
