= Jacques Nicolas Colbert =

French churchman (1655–1707)

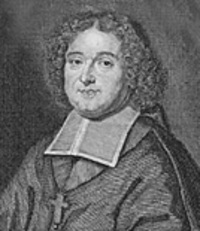
Jacques Nicolas Colbert

Jacques Nicolas Colbert (14 February 1655, in Paris – 10 December 1707, in Paris) was a French churchman.

Youngest son of Minister Jean-Baptiste Colbert, he was educated for a career in the church, tutored by Noël Alexandre, a Dominican theologian and philosopher later condemned for his Jansenist views.

The young Colbert was abbot at Le Bec-Hellouin before becoming Archbishop of Rouen in 1691. He was admitted to the Académie Française on 31 October 1678 and was one of the first members of the Académie des Inscriptions et Belles-Lettres.

He was a patron of Jules Hardouin-Mansart and André Le Nôtre and commissioned the restoration of the official residence of the Archbishops of Rouen, the Château de Gaillon.

== Publications ==
- Philosophia vetus et nova, ad usum scholae accommodata, in regia Burgundia novissimo hoc biennio pertractata (1674)
- Harangue faite au roi, à Versailles, le 21 juillet 1685, par monseigneur l'illustrissime et révérendissime Jacques-Nicolas Colbert, archevêque et primat de Carthage, assisté de messeigneurs les archevêques, évêques, et autres députés de l'Assemblée générale tenue à Saint-Germain-en-Laye en ladite année 1685, en prenant congé de Sa Majesté (1685)
