= Château du Saussay =

French monument

Coordinates: 48°31′6″N 2°22′25″E

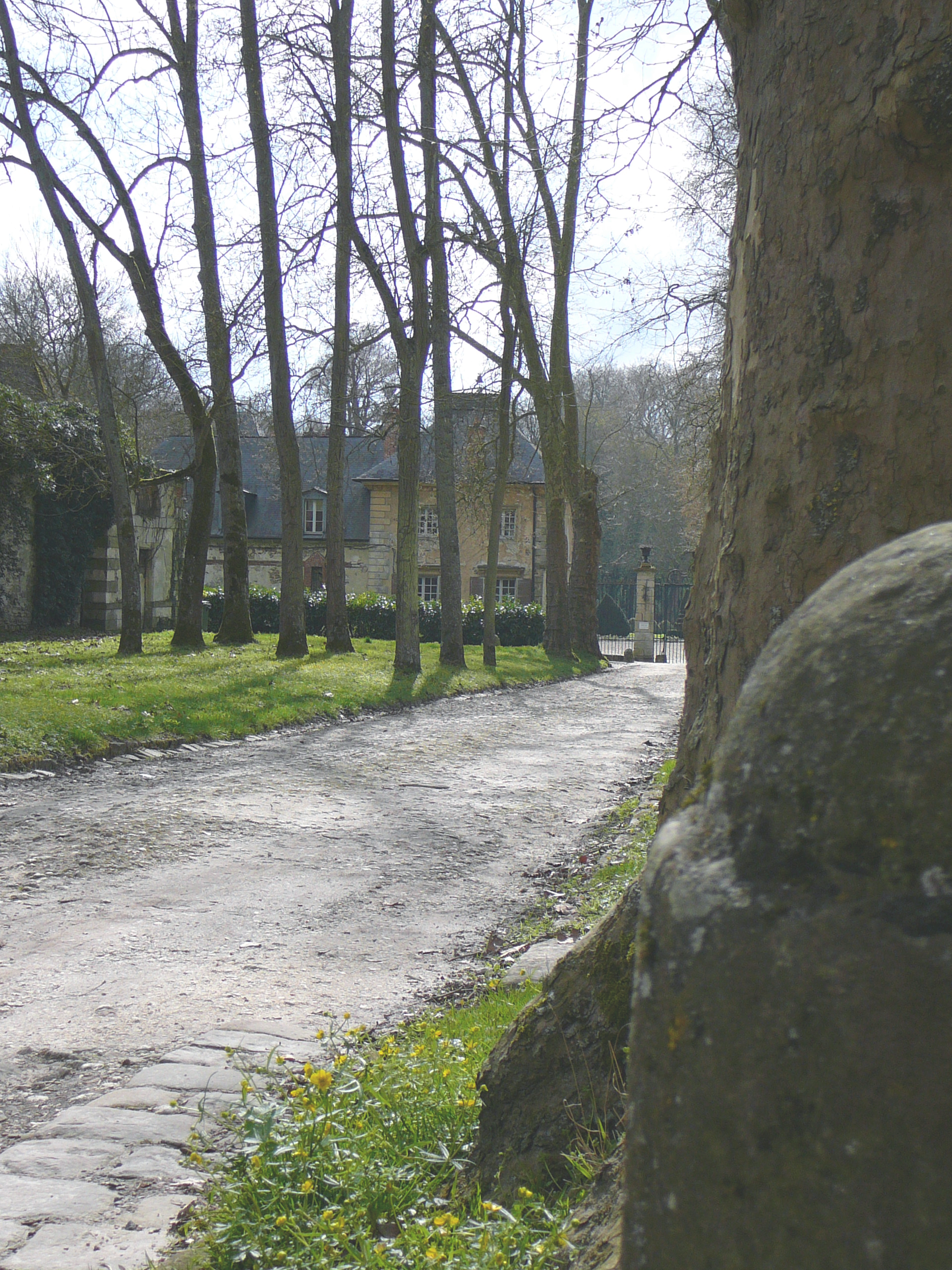
The Château du Saussay

The château du Saussay is a French château that forms part of the commune of Ballancourt-sur-Essonne in the department of Essonne. It is situated in the valley of the river Essonne between Corbeil and La Ferté-Alais, on the territory of an old Templar commandery. It is built on the ruins of a 15th-century feudal castle, and is a rare collection of two 18th-century châteaux facing each other at the entrance to a Romantic park surrounded by water. Inside, their reception rooms evoke the lives of their inhabitants. The Château du Grand-Saussay and its park are listed monuments.

== History ==
The property of Olivier Le Daim, barber to the French kings from Louis XI to Louis XV, the château was burned by the Spanish during the Wars of Religion.

The owner obtained permission from Henry IV by letters patent to surround the château with water. He then rebuilt the château in the brick-and-stone style. The property of Me de Gaumont, a member of parliament, it was handed down by the women of the Bragelongne family, by Canclaux and finally Colbert at the start of the 19th century.

In 1735 a pavilion - identical in appearance to the original château - was built facing it, to give the appearance (surviving to this day) of two châteaux opening onto a park. Just before the French Revolution, the entry building and raised bridge were demolished and replaced with two elegant pavilions in the style of the architect Nicolas Ledoux (end of the 18th century). In the 19th century the Colberts doubled the size of the main pavilion and endowed the château with a magnificent library.

At the start of the 20th century, the château passed to the Bourbon Busset family, and the park was redesigned by the great landscape artist Achille Duchêne, joining the charm of parks in the English style with classical harmony of gardens in the French style. His redesigned park was made up of three perspectives, several water features, and lawns framed with topiary or planted with rare trees. The académicien Jacques de Bourbon Busset lived in this château, where his children, grandchildren and great-grandchildren still live today.

== Use as a film location ==
The real Château du Saussay provided locations for Fred Zinnemann's The Day of the Jackal (1973) and interior shots for Stephen Frears' Dangerous Liaisons (1988).
