= Jean-Jules-Armand Colbert =

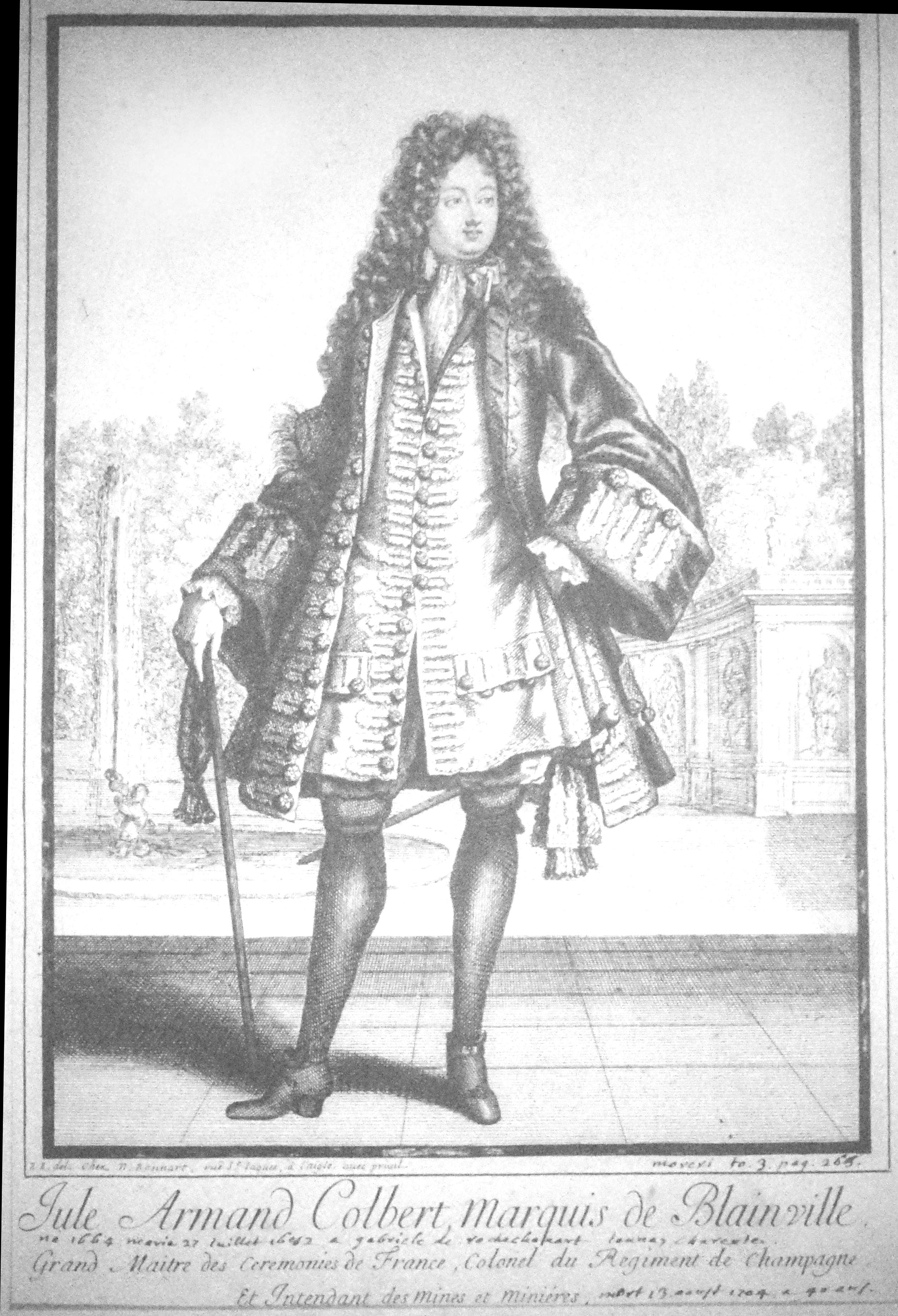
Marquis de Blainville (1663–1704)

Jean-Jules-Armand Colbert, Marquis de Blainville (17 December 1663 – Ulm, 13 August 1704) was a French nobleman, Master of Ceremonies, and military officer.

== Biography ==
Colbert was the fourth son of Jean-Baptiste Colbert, Marquis de Seignelay and Chief minister of France, and Marie Charron Menars. Through his marriage to Gabrielle de Rochechouart-Morte, he became a nobleman and bore the title Marquis de Blainville.

He became Superintendent of Buildings, a title he inherited from his father in 1674, and Grand Master of Ceremonies of France in 1685. He disliked these functions at Court, as he felt drawn to military service.

He rose quickly in the army of Louis XIV, becoming captain in the Picardy Regiment (1683) and colonel of the Foix Regiment (1684). He participated in the capture of Philippsburg, Mannheim, and Frankenthal in the Nine Years' War. He fought at Cochem and received a regiment in his name, with which he served in Germany (1690). He was promoted to maréchal de camp, fought on the Moselle and commanded the Rhine troops from Rheinzabern to Lauterbourg, served on the Meuse (1696), in Flanders (1697), and in Landau (1699).

After selling his title of Superintendent, he returned to military service after the outbreak of the War of the Spanish Succession in 1701 and participated in the sieges of Kortrijk and Diksmuide. As acting military governor, he was forced to surrender after 59 days in the Siege of Kaiserswerth (1702). The Prince of Nassau-Usingen granted him honorable terms. This brave resistance earned him the title of Lieutenant-General.

He then served in the Low Countries, in the army of the young Louis, Duke of Burgundy and Marshal Boufflers. From 1703, he fought in Bavaria under Marshal Villars. He participated in the First Battle of Höchstädt, served in the army of the Elector of Bavaria, and in 1704 fought alongside Marshal Marsin, capturing the small imperial city of Giengen.

Jean-Jules-Armand Colbert also fought in the disastrous Second Battle of Höchstädt, where he was so severely wounded on 13 August, that he died the same day.

== Sources ==
- Jacques de Quincy, Histoire militaire du règne de Louis le Grand, vol. 3, (Paris), 1726, 825 p..
- Jean-Baptiste-Pierre Jullien de Courcelles, Dictionnaire historique et biographique des généraux français, depuis le onzième siècle jusqu'en 1821, Paris, 1821, volume 3, p. 562
