= Vandières, Marne =

Vandières
- Commune
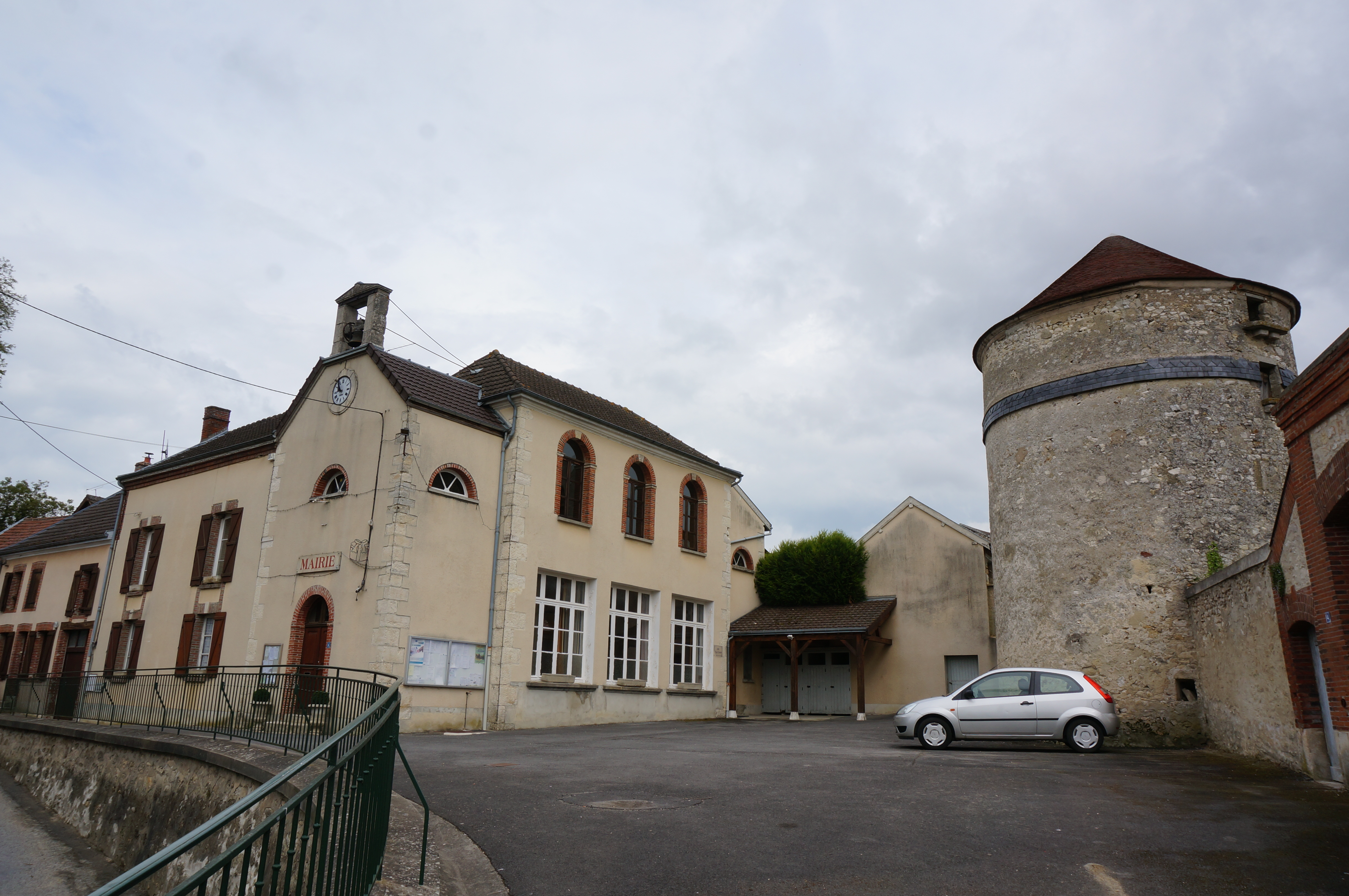
- The town hall in Vandières

- Coat of arms
- Location of Vandières
- Location within France Location within Grand Est
- Coordinates: 49°06′31″N 3°44′18″E
- Country: France
- Region: Grand Est
- Department: Marne
- Arrondissement: Épernay
- Canton: Dormans-Paysages de Champagne
- Intercommunality: Paysages de la Champagne

Government
  - Mayor (2020–2026): Odile Lemaire
- Area^{1}: 13.2 km^{2} (5.1 sq mi)
- Elevation: 120 m (390 ft)
- Population (2023): 303
  - Density: 23.0/km^{2} (59.5/sq mi)
- Time zone: UTC+01:00 (CET)
  - Summer (DST): UTC+02:00 (CEST)
- INSEE/Postal code: 51592 /51700
- ^{1} French Land Register data, which excludes lakes, ponds, glaciers > 1 km^{2} (0.386 sq mi or 247 acres) and river estuaries.

Vandières (French pronunciation: [vɑ̃djɛʁ]) is a commune in the Marne department in north-eastern France.

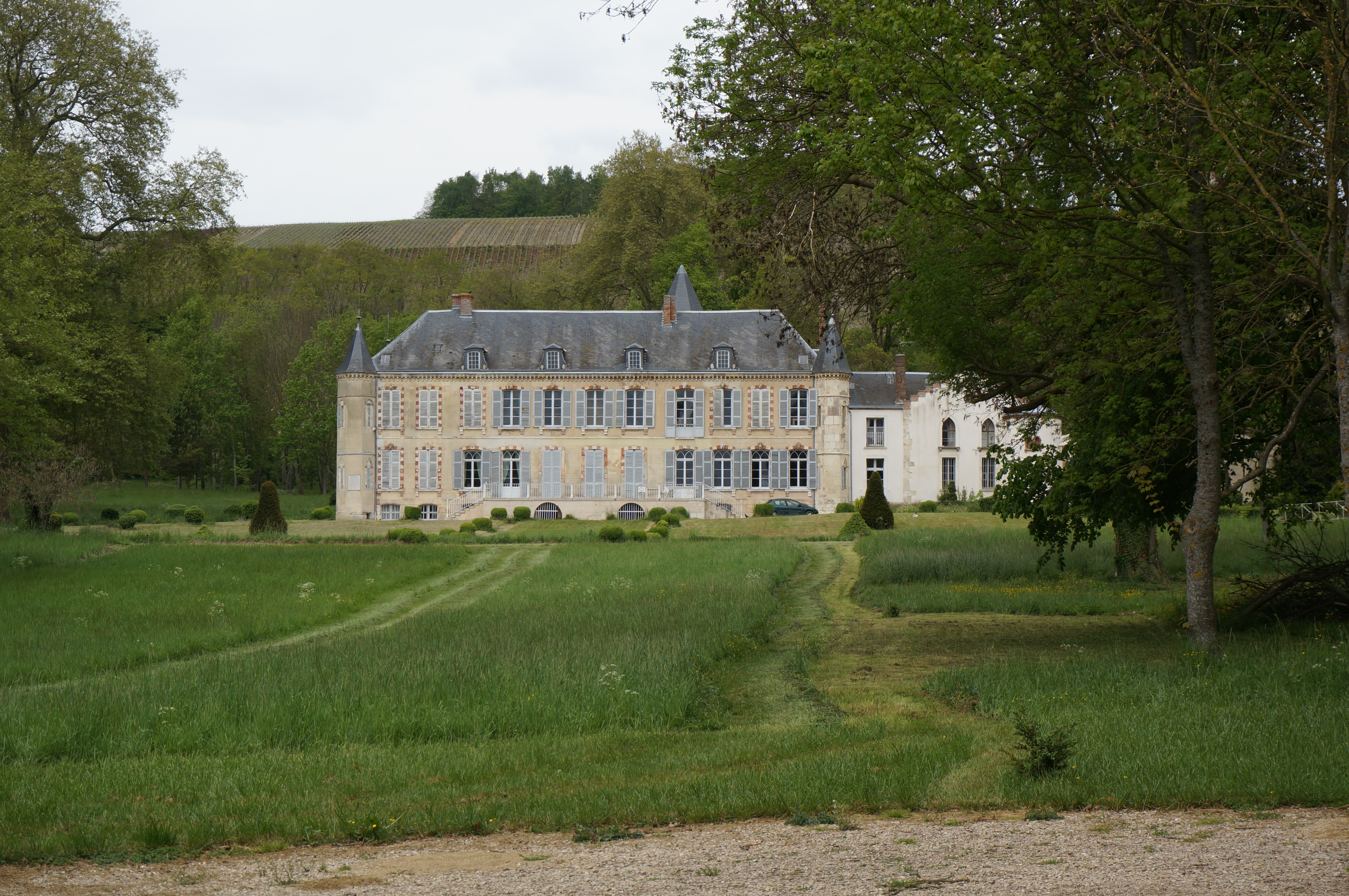
Château Vandières.

== See also ==
- Communes of the Marne department
- Montagne de Reims Regional Natural Park
