= Jean-Baptiste Colbert =

French statesman (1619–1683)

Jean-Baptiste Colbert Lord of Vandières and Cernay
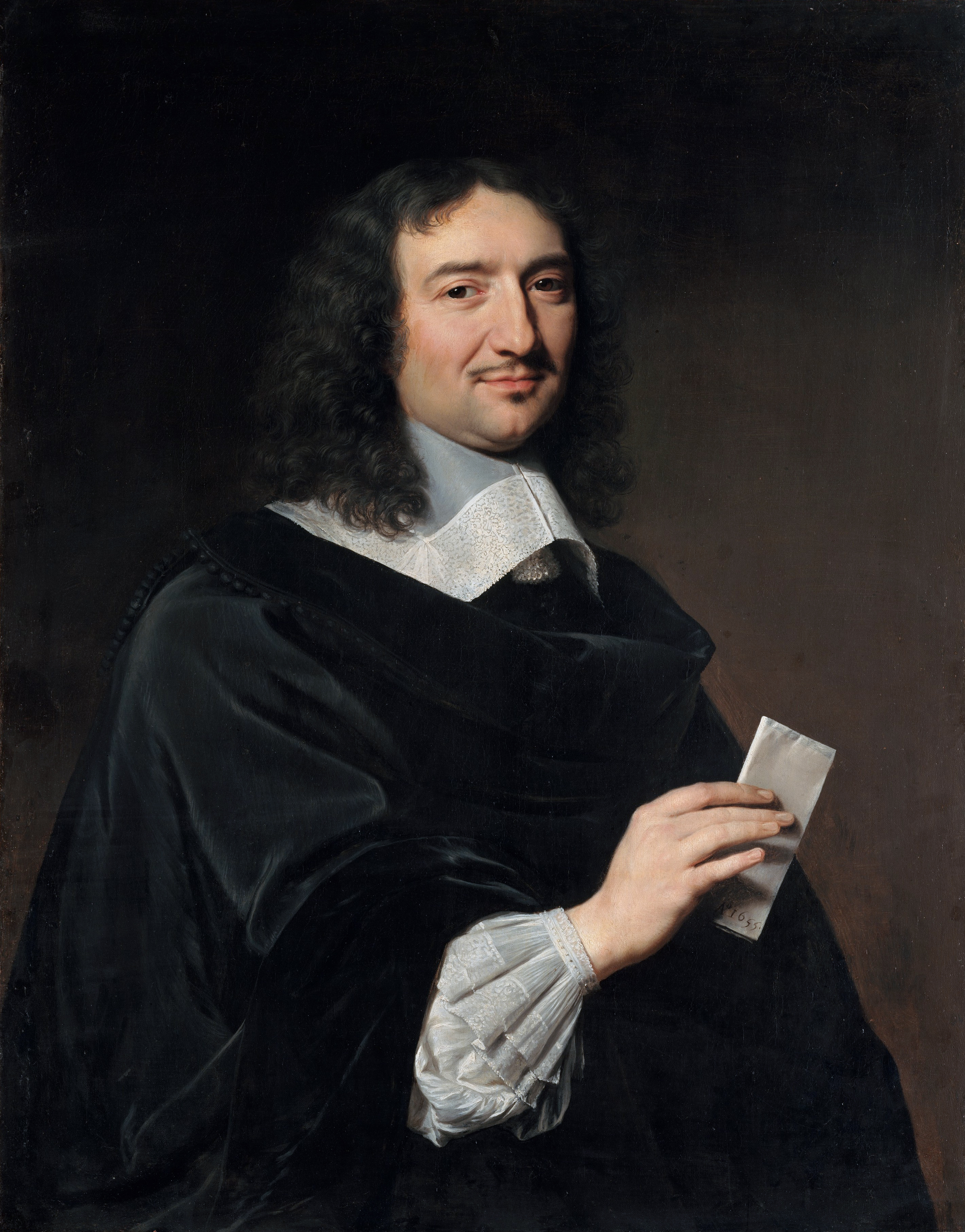
- Portrait de Jean-Baptiste Colbert (1655) by Philippe de Champaigne

Chief minister of France
- In office 9 March 1661 – 6 September 1683
- Monarch: Louis XIV
- Preceded by: Cardinal Mazarin
- Succeeded by: The Marquis of Louvois

Secretary of State of the Navy of France
- In office 7 March 1669 – 6 September 1683
- Monarch: Louis XIV
- First Minister of State: Himself
- Preceded by: The Marquis of Fresnes
- Succeeded by: The Marquis of Seignelay

Secretary of State of the Maison du Roi of France
- In office 16 February 1669 – 6 September 1683
- Monarch: Louis XIV
- First Minister of State: Himself
- Preceded by: Henri de Guénégaud
- Succeeded by: The Marquis of Louvois

Controller-General of Finances of France
- In office 12 December 1665 – 6 September 1683
- Monarch: Louis XIV
- First Minister of State: Himself
- Preceded by: Louis Le Tonnelier
- Succeeded by: Claude Le Pelletier

Personal details
- Born: 29 August 1619 Reims, France
- Died: 6 September 1683 (aged 64) Paris, France
- Resting place: Saint-Eustache, Paris
- Spouse: Marie Charron (m. 1648–1683)
- Children: Jean-Baptiste; Jacques Nicolas; Jean-Jules-Armand
- Nickname(s): Le Grand Colbert (The Great Colbert)

Academic background
- Influences: Josiah Child; Barthélemy de Laffemas

Academic work
- Discipline: Economics; Military science; Architecture
- School or tradition: Mercantilism
- Institutions: Académie française; Académie royale d'architecture; Académie des sciences
- Notable ideas: Colbertism
- Awards: Order of the Holy Spirit

Jean-Baptiste Colbert (French: [ʒɑ̃batist kɔlbɛʁ]; 29 August 1619 – 6 September 1683) was a French statesman who served as First Minister of State from 1661 until his death in 1683 under the rule of King Louis XIV. His lasting impact on the organization of the country's politics and markets, known as Colbertism, a doctrine often characterized as a variant of mercantilism, earned him the nickname le Grand Colbert ([lə ɡʁɑ̃ kɔl.bɛʁ]; "the Great Colbert").

A native of Reims, he was appointed Intendant of Finances on 4 May 1661. Colbert took over as Controller-General of Finances, a newly created position, in the aftermath of the arrest of Nicolas Fouquet for embezzlement, an event that led to the abolishment of the office of Superintendent of Finances. He worked to develop the domestic economy by raising tariffs and encouraging major public works projects, as well as to ensure that the French East India Company had access to foreign markets, so that they could always obtain coffee, cotton, dyewoods, fur, pepper, and sugar. He acted to create a favorable balance of trade and increase colonial holdings. As there was slavery in the colonies, in 1682, Colbert commissioned the beginning of a project that would become the Code Noir in 1685, two years after his death. In addition, he founded France's merchant navy (marine marchande), becoming Secretary of State of the Navy in 1669.

His effective market reforms included the foundation of the Manufacture royale de glaces de miroirs in 1665 to supplant the importation of Venetian glass, which was forbidden in 1672 as soon as the national glass manufacturing industry was on sound footing. Also encouraging the technical expertise of Flemish cloth manufacturing in France, he founded royal tapestry works at Gobelins and supported those at Beauvais. He issued more than 150 edicts to regulate the guilds. The Académie des sciences was founded in 1666 at his suggestion; he was a member of the Académie française from 1 March 1667 to his death, where he occupied the 24th seat, to which Jean de La Fontaine was later elected. His son Jean-Baptiste Colbert, Marquis de Seignelay (1651–1690), succeeded him as Navy Secretary.

== Biography ==
=== Early life ===
Colbert's father and grandfather were merchants in his birthplace of Reims, France. He claimed to have Scottish ancestry. A widespread (but unconfirmed) belief exists that he spent his early youth at a Jesuit college, working for a Parisian banker; as well as working for the father of Jean Chapelain.

Before the age of 20, Colbert had a post in the war office, a position generally attributed to the marriage of an uncle to the sister of Secretary of War Michel Le Tellier. Colbert spent some time as an inspector of troops, eventually becoming the personal secretary of Le Tellier. In 1647, through unknown means, Colbert acquired the confiscated goods of an uncle, Pussort. In 1648, he and his wife Marie Charron, received 40,000 crowns from an unknown source; and in 1649 Colbert became the councilor of state, i.e. a political minister.

In 1657, he purchased the Barony of Seignelay.

=== Rise to power ===
Colbert was recommended to King Louis XIV by Mazarin. While Cardinal Mazarin was in exile, Louis's trust in Colbert grew. In 1652, Colbert was asked to manage the affairs of the Cardinal while he was away. This new responsibility would detach Colbert from his other responsibility as commissaire des guerres. Although Colbert was not a supporter of Mazarin in principle, he would defend the cardinal's interests with unflagging devotion.

Colbert's earliest recorded attempt at tax reform came in the form of a mémoire to Mazarin, showing that less than half of the taxes paid by the people reached the King. The paper also contained an attack on Nicolas Fouquet. The postmaster of Paris, a spy of Fouquet's, read the letter, leading to a dispute which Mazarin attempted to suppress.

In 1661, Mazarin died and Colbert "made sure of the King's favor" by revealing the location of some of Mazarin's hidden wealth. In January 1664 Colbert became the Superintendent of buildings; in 1665 he became Controller-General of Finances; in 1669, he became Secretary of State of the Navy; he also gained appointments as minister of commerce, of the colonies, and of the palace. In short, Colbert acquired power in every department except that of war.

A great financial and fiscal reform now claimed all his energies. Not only the nobility, but many others who had no legal claim to exemption, paid no taxes; the bulk of the burden fell on the rural poor. Supported by the young king Louis XIV, Colbert aimed the first blow at the man accused of being the greatest of the royal embezzlers, the superintendent Nicolas Fouquet. Fouquet's fall secured Colbert's own advancement.

=== Economic reform ===
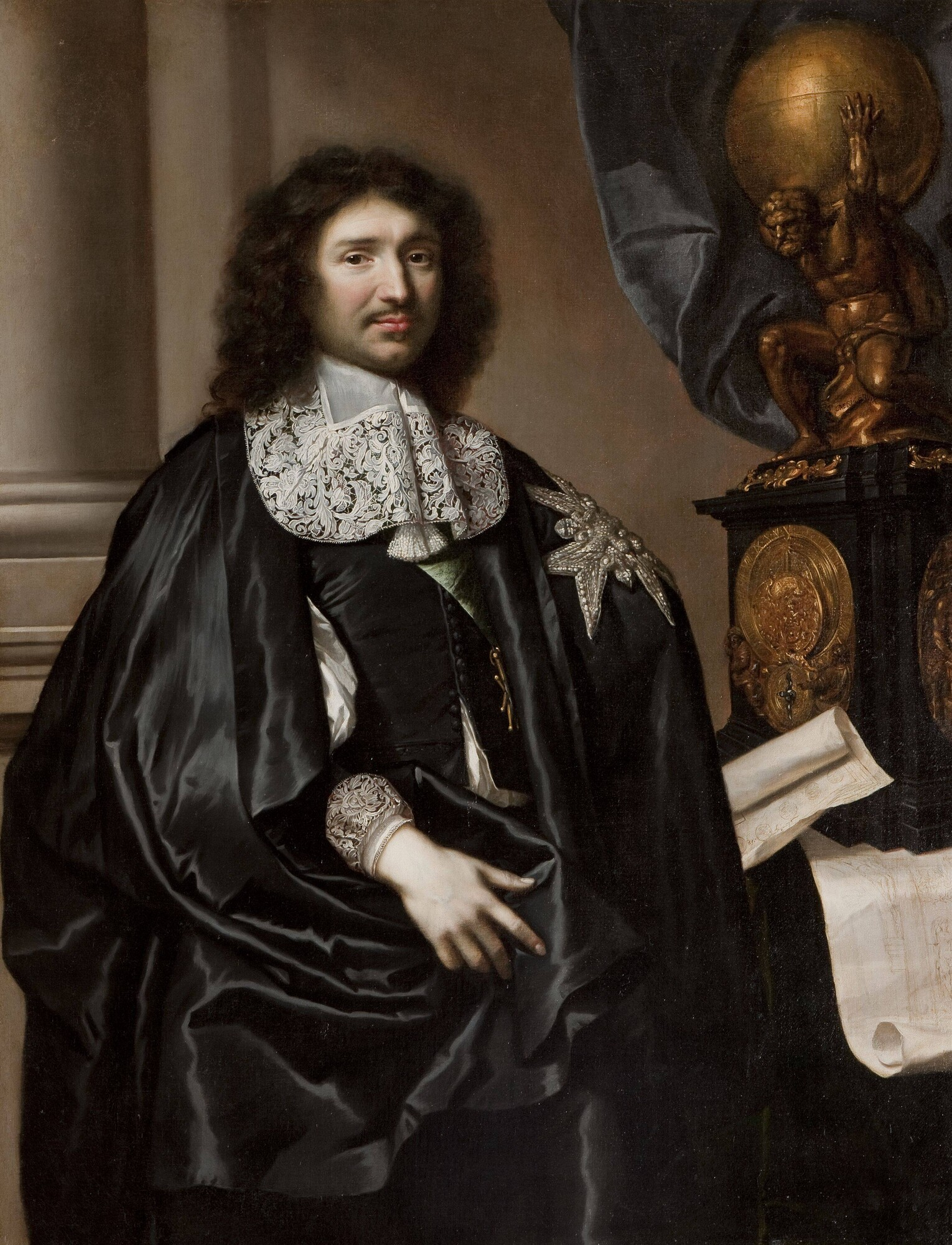
Colbert en grande tenue by Claude Lefèbvre, 1666

After the abolition of the office of superintendent and of many other offices dependent upon it, control of France's finances fell to a royal council. The sovereign functioned as its president, but Colbert, though only an intendant for the first four years, operated as its ruling spirit, enjoying as he did king's favor and confidence.

His ruthlessness in the execution of his functions may have set a dangerous precedent, but it probably struck him necessary in that the council could not defer to individual interests. This way of administering his policies was particularly in evidence in his preparation and enforcement of his forestry ordinance of 1669. When he had severely punished guilty officials, he turned his attention to the government's fraudulent creditors. Here he had a simple way of operating. He repudiated some of the public loans and reduced the interest rate on others. The amount of the reduction was initially his own decision but ultimately that of a council he established to examine all claims against the state.

Much more serious difficulties met his attempts to introduce equality in taxation among the various classes. Cutting back the number of the privileged proved impossible, but Colbert firmly resisted false claims for exemption and lightened direct taxation by increasing indirect taxes, from which the privileged could not escape. At the same time, he undertook improvements to the way taxes were collected.

In 1665, Colbert suggested bringing the country under a unified system of weights and measures.

Colbert's relentless hard work and thrift made him an esteemed minister. He achieved a reputation for improving the state of French manufacturing and bringing the economy back from the brink of bankruptcy. Nevertheless, despite his best efforts, France grew increasingly impoverished because of the King's excessive spending on wars.

=== Economic theory ===
Having introduced a measure of order and economy into the workings of the government, Colbert called for the enrichment of the country by means of commerce. Through Colbert's dirigiste policies, France fostered manufacturing enterprises in a wide variety of fields. The authorities established new industries, protected inventors, invited in workmen from foreign countries, and prohibited French workmen from emigrating.

To maintain the character of French goods in foreign markets as well as to afford a guarantee to the domestic consumer, Colbert had the quality and quantity of each article fixed by law, punishing breaches of the regulations by public exposure of the delinquent and destruction of the goods concerned, and, on the third offense, by the pillory. Colbert prohibited the production of certain products that might have suited consumers, and the time-consuming supervision he imposed on commercial enterprises may have acted as a hindrance to improvement. Other parts of Colbert's schemes have met with less equivocal condemnation.

By his firm maintenance of the corporation system, each industry remained in the hands of certain privileged bourgeois; while the lower classes found opportunities of advancement closed. He did, however, wisely consult the interests of internal commerce.

Unable to abolish the duties on the passage of goods from province to province, he did what he could to induce the provinces to equalize them. Currency exchange rates still remained between these provinces despite a policy focusing on the unification of French trade. His régime improved roads and canals. Pierre Paul Riquet (1604–1680) planned and constructed the Canal du Midi under Colbert's patronage.

To encourage overseas trade with the Levant, Senegal, Guinea and other places, Colbert granted privileges to companies, but, like the noted French East India Company, all proved unsuccessful.

=== Promoter of culture and science ===
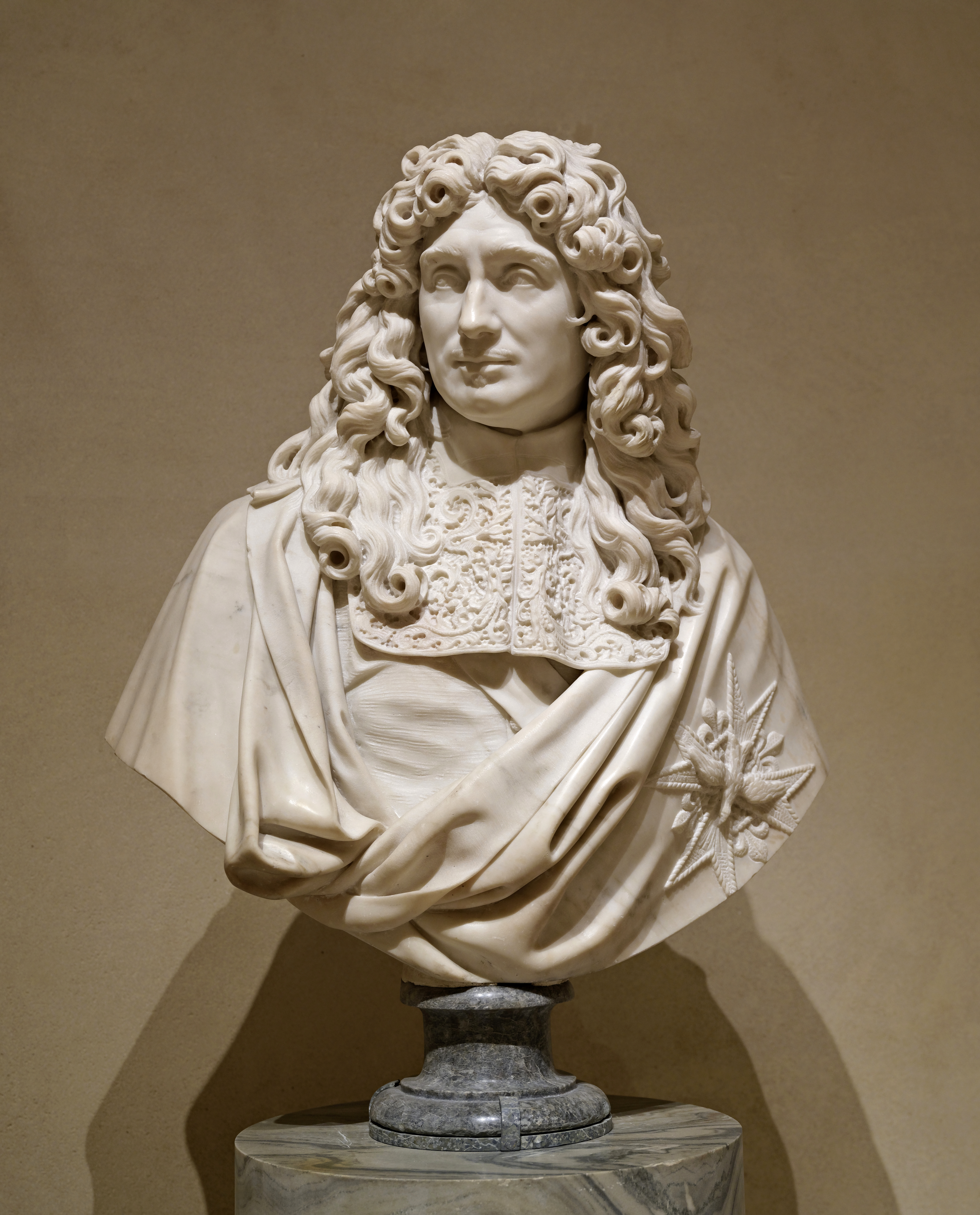
Bust of Colbert by Antoine Coysevox, Paris, Louvre

Colbert took much interest in art and literature. He possessed a remarkably fine private library, which he delighted to fill with valuable manuscripts from every part of Europe and the Near East where France had placed a consul. He employed Pierre de Carcavi and Étienne Baluze as librarians. Colbert's grandson sold the manuscript collection in 1732 to the Bibliothèque Royale.

Colbert founded a number of institutions:

- in 1663 the Academy of Inscriptions and Medals
- in 1666 the Academy of Sciences
- in 1667 the Paris Observatory, which he employed Claude Perrault to build and brought Giovanni Domenico Cassini (1625–1712) from Italy to superintend
- in 1669 the Académie d'Opéra, later renamed the Académie Royale de Musique, and the École royale des jeunes de langues|Royal School for Language Apprentices (located at Constantinople, moved in Paris in 1700)
- in 1671 the Academy of Architecture
- Academies at Arles, Soissons, Nîmes and many other towns

He reorganised the Academy of Painting and Sculpture which Mazarin had established. Wishing to increase the prestige of the image of France and the French royal family, Colbert played an active role in bringing the great Italian architect-sculptor, Gian Lorenzo Bernini, to Paris (June–October 1665), in order to design the new East Facade of the Louvre. This was a striking coup and caused a sensation because Bernini, the most famous artist in all of Europe, had never before (or after) consented to travel any significant distance to meet a patron, however highly ranked, but had to agree in this case for reasons of diplomacy between France and the Holy See. While in France, Bernini also sculpted a marble portrait bust of Louis XIV (Versailles palace). However the relations between the two strong-willed men, Colbert and Bernini, proved melodramatically stormy. Bernini's Louvre design was ultimately rejected.

In 1666 Colbert established an Académie dedicated to the development of science and advising the government in this field. For the French Academy of Sciences he chose scientists, mathematicians, as well as physicists which at the time included anatomists, botanists, and zoologists. The first session was held on 22 December 1666 in Paris. Colbert himself became a member of the Académie Française. He proposed one very characteristic rule with the intention of expediting the great Dictionary, in which he had a great interest: no one could count as present at any meeting unless he arrived before the hour of commencement and remained till the hour for leaving.

In 1673 Colbert presided over the first exhibition of the works of living painters and he enriched the Louvre with hundreds of pictures and statues.

He gave many pensions to men of letters, among whom we find Molière, Corneille, Racine, Boileau, P D Huet (1630–1721) and Antoine Varillas (1626–1696); and even foreigners, as Huygens, Carlo Roberto Dati the Dellacruscan. Evidence exists to show that by this munificence he hoped to draw out praises of his sovereign and himself. But this motive certainly does not account for all the splendid, if in some cases specious, services that he rendered to literature, science and art.

=== Death ===
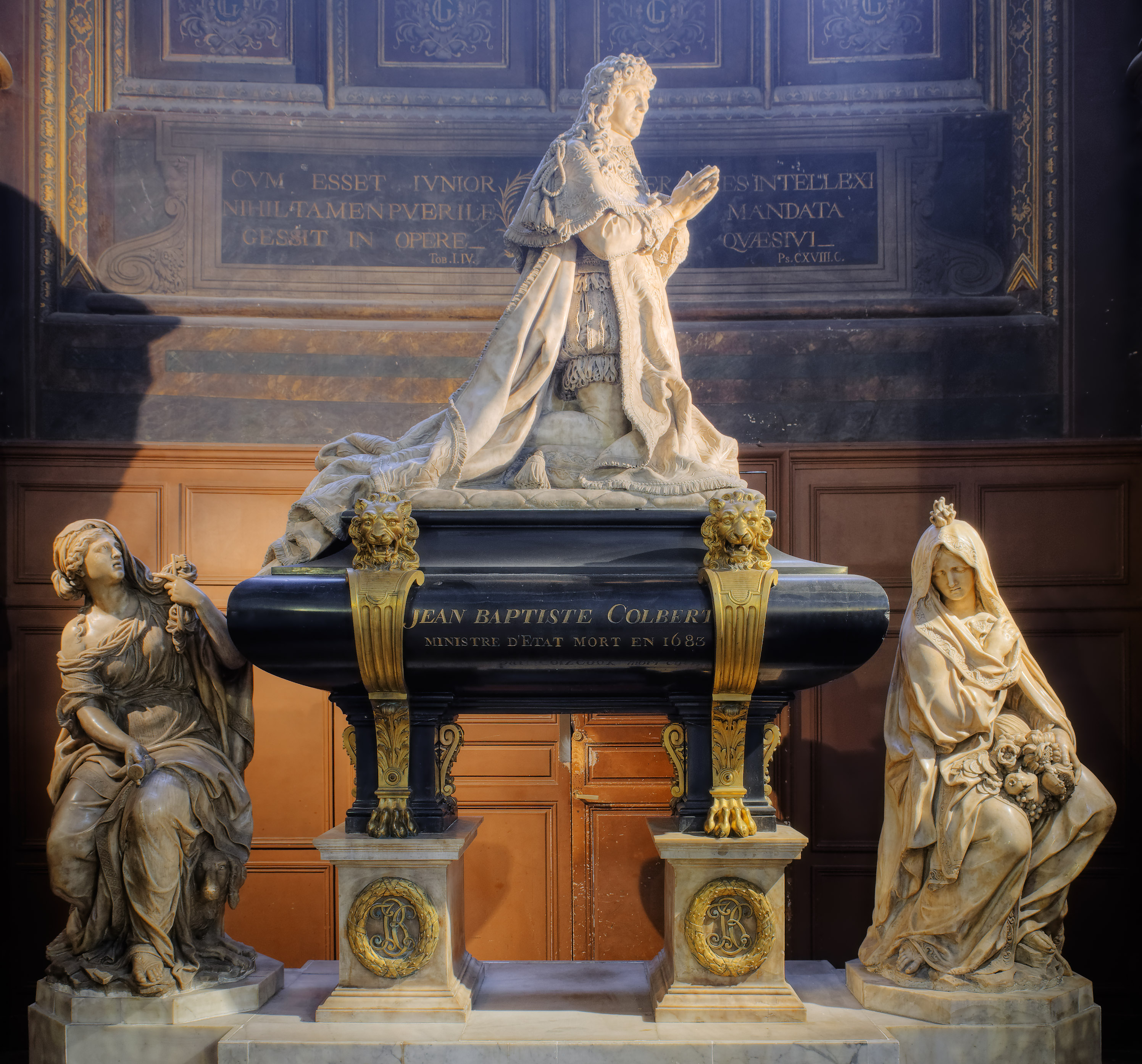
The tomb of Colbert, by Antoine Coysevox and Jean-Baptiste Tuby, 1685, in Église Saint-Eustache, Paris

Colbert worked incessantly hard until his final hours. Work was his religion; he once pondered whether it was better to rise early and work or retire very late and work. He concluded that rising early and retiring late would be the ideal combination. Towards the end of his life he suffered from stomach aches, which caused him much distress. He was reduced to eating moist bread dipped in chicken broth for his meals.

By 64 he was bedridden and died seven days after his birthday. The surgeons who examined him found that he had been suffering from kidney stones. A huge stone was found in his urinary tract, which would explain his pain.

== Legacy ==
Coat of arms of the Colbert family

The main building of the Ministry of the Economy and Finance building, completed in 1989, is named after him.

Colbert had nine children, including :

- Jeanne-Marie Colbert (1650–1732), married Charles Honoré d'Albert, duc de Luynes
- Jean-Baptiste Colbert, Marquis de Seignelay (1651–1690), followed his father as Secretary of State of the Navy
- Jacques-Nicolas Colbert (1654–1707), Archbishop of Rouen
- Henriette-Louise (1657–1733), married Paul de Beauvilliers, 2nd duc de Saint-Aignan
- Antoine-Martin Colbert (1659–1689), killed after the Battle of Walcourt
- Jean-Jules-Armand Colbert (1664–1704), marquis de Blainville, killed at the Battle of Blenheim
- Charles-Edouard Colbert (1670–1690), comte de Sceaux, killed at the Battle of Fleurus

His policies inspired those of Alexander Hamilton, the first treasury secretary of the United States.

Six ships of the French Navy bore his name:

- A steam corvette in 1848
- A battleship in 1875
- A cargo ship in 1914
- A dundee in 1916
- A French heavy cruiser, launched 1928
- A French missile cruiser, launched 1956

In literature, the power struggle between Colbert and Fouquet is one of the main plotlines of Alexandre Dumas, père's novel The Vicomte of Bragelonne, the second sequel to The Three Musketeers. Dumas paints Colbert as an uncouth and ruthless schemer who stops at little, in contrast to the more refined Fouquet, counselled by Aramis, but also as a visionary patriot.

== The Code Noir ==
Colbert's statue stands outside the Assemblée nationale. Following a series of international protests, the statue was vandalized in 2020 due to Colbert's part in drafting the Code Noir. This legal instrument sanctioned an intentionally brutal system of torture and repression to enforce institutional slavery in the French colonial empire and restrict the enterprise of free Black people.

== Quotes ==
- "It is simply, and solely, the abundance of money within a state [which] makes the difference in its grandeur and power."
- "The art of taxation consists in so plucking the goose as to obtain the largest [number] of feathers with the least possible amount of hissing."

== See also ==
- French West India Company
- Nicolas Fouquet
- French forestry Ordinance of 1669

== Sources ==
- Ames, Glenn J. Colbert, Mercantilism, and the French Quest for Asian Trade (1996)
- Chisholm, Hugh, ed. (1911). "Colbert, Jean Baptiste" . Encyclopædia Britannica (11th ed.). Cambridge University Press.
- Clément, Jean-Pierre. Vie de Colbert, (Paris, 1846)

Lettres, instructions, et Memoires de Colbert, (eight volumes, Paris, 1861–82)
Histoire de Colbert et son administration, edited by Mademoiselle Clément, (Paris, 1874)

- Gordault, Colbert, ministre de Louis XIV, (Tours, 1885)
- Lavisse, Histoire de France, volume vii, part i, (Tours, 1905)
- Sargent, Economic Policy of Colbert, (London, 1899), which contains a bibliography of works relating to Colbert and his time.
- Tellier, Luc-Normand, Face aux Colbert : les Le Tellier, Vauban, Turgot ... et l'avènement du libéralisme, Presses de l'Université du Québec, 1987, 816 pages.
- Soll, Jacob The Information Master: Jean-Baptiste Colbert's Secret State Intelligence System; (University of Michigan Press 2009).
