= Antoine II Coëffier de Ruzé =

French aristocrat (1638–1719)

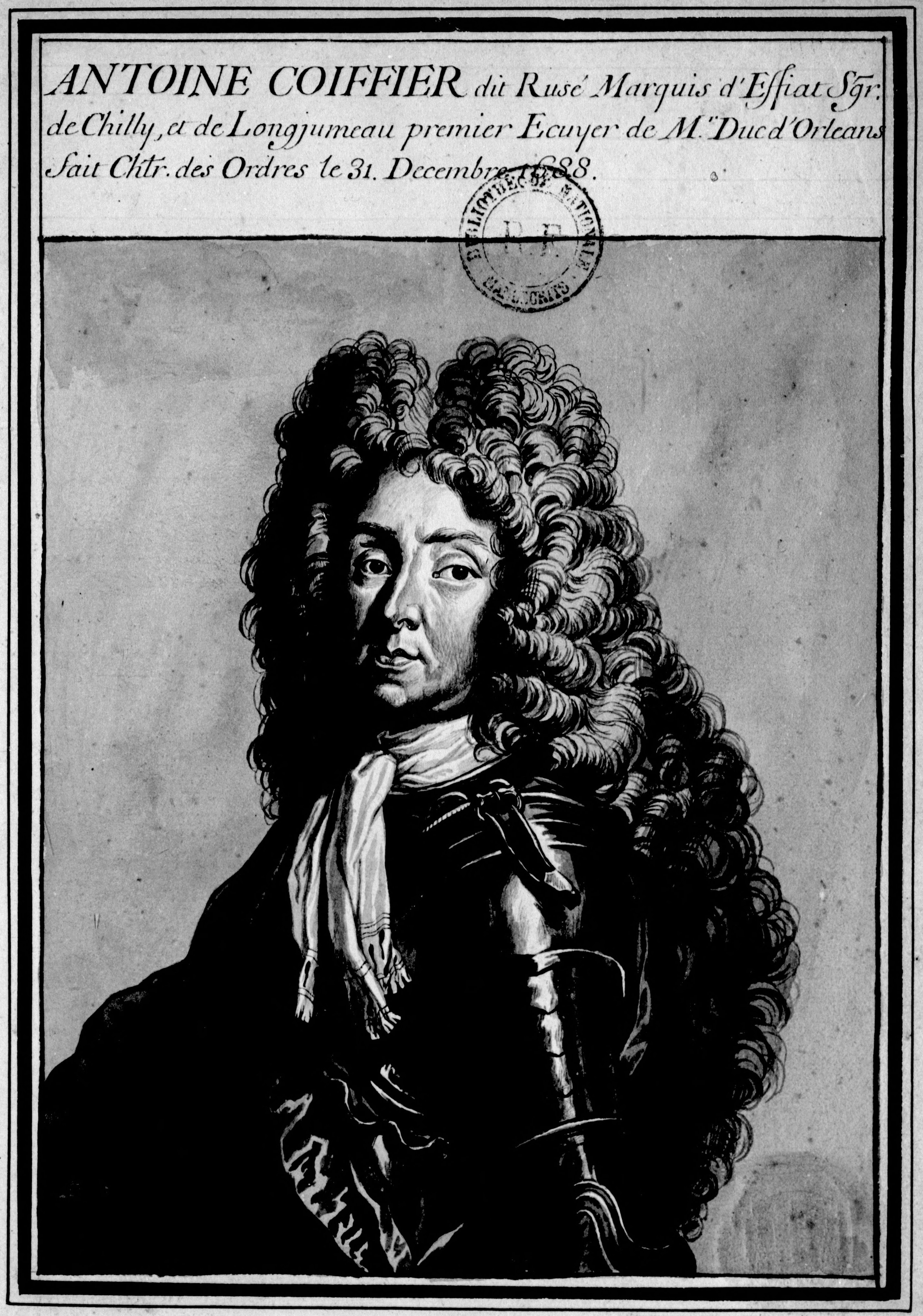
- Portrait taken from Volumes consacrés à l'histoire de l'ordre du Saint-Esprit.
- Born: 1638 or 1639
- Died: June 1719; Paris
- Occupation: Courtier
- Spouse: Marie-Anne Olivier de Leuville
- Parents: Martin Coëffier de Ruzé (father); Isabelle d'Escoubleau de Sourdi (mother)

Antoine II Coëffier (or Coiffier) de Ruzé (or Coiffier-Ruzé), Marquis d'Effiat, was a French aristocrat who born in 1638 or 1639 and died in Paris in June 1719. A grand seigneur with possessions in the Auvergne, Loire Valley, and Paris regions, he was a member of the court at Versailles and a keen hunter on his lands and those of the House of Orléans.

A member of the household of the two successive Dukes of Orléans, he has a sulfurous reputation due to his relationships with them. As one of Philippe I's favorite lovers, he was involved in many intrigues, notably against Philippe's two successive wives. Members of the court suspected him of having poisoned Philippe's first wife, Henrietta of England, and he was an enemy of the second, Princess Palatine Elisabeth-Charlotte of Bavaria. She refused to allow him to be governor to her son, the future Regent. Nevertheless, he played a role in concluding the latter's marriage to Mademoiselle de Blois and became one of her "roués", debauched companions at the famous "petits soupers". Saint-Simon detested the Marquis d'Effiat.

During the Polysynod, he was vice-president of the Finance Council, and then a member of the Regency Council. He founded the royal military college in Effiat and hospices in Chilly and Montrichard. He died childless, and this branch of the Coëffier de Ruzé family died out with him.

== Biography ==
=== Family ===
Antoine II Coëffier de Ruzé, Marquis d'Effiat, born 1638 or 1639, was the son of Martin Coëffier de Ruzé, Marquis d'Effiat (1612–1644) and Isabeau d'Escoubleau de Sourdis (died 1644), married in 1637. He was the nephew of the Marquis de Cinq-Mars, a favorite of Louis XIII, who was executed in 1642 for conspiring against Richelieu, and the grandson of his namesake Antoine Coëffier de Ruzé, Superintendent of Finances and Marshal of France.

The Marquis d'Effiat was orphaned at an early age, five or six, and was survived only by his grandmother Marie de Fourcy, wife of Antoine Coëffier de Ruzé, through whom he was linked to the powerful ministerial family of the Phélypeaux and to the minister Claude Le Peletier, who in 1696 bought the Hôtel d'Effiat, the family's former Parisian townhouse.

On May 2, 1660, he married Marie-Anne Olivier de Leuville, born in 1637 or 1638, daughter of Louis Olivier, Marquis de Leuville, lieutenant general of the king's armies, and his wife Anne Morand. Marie-Anne Olivier de Leuville died on February 21, 1684, childless. Thereafter, the Marquis d'Effiat did not remarry.

=== Grand seigneur and courtier ===
Antoine II Coëffier de Ruzé was marquis of Effiat, lord of Vichy, Longjumeau, Gannat, Montrichard and Chilly. He was lord of Crocq from 1668 to 1701 when he sold this barony to François du Ligondès.

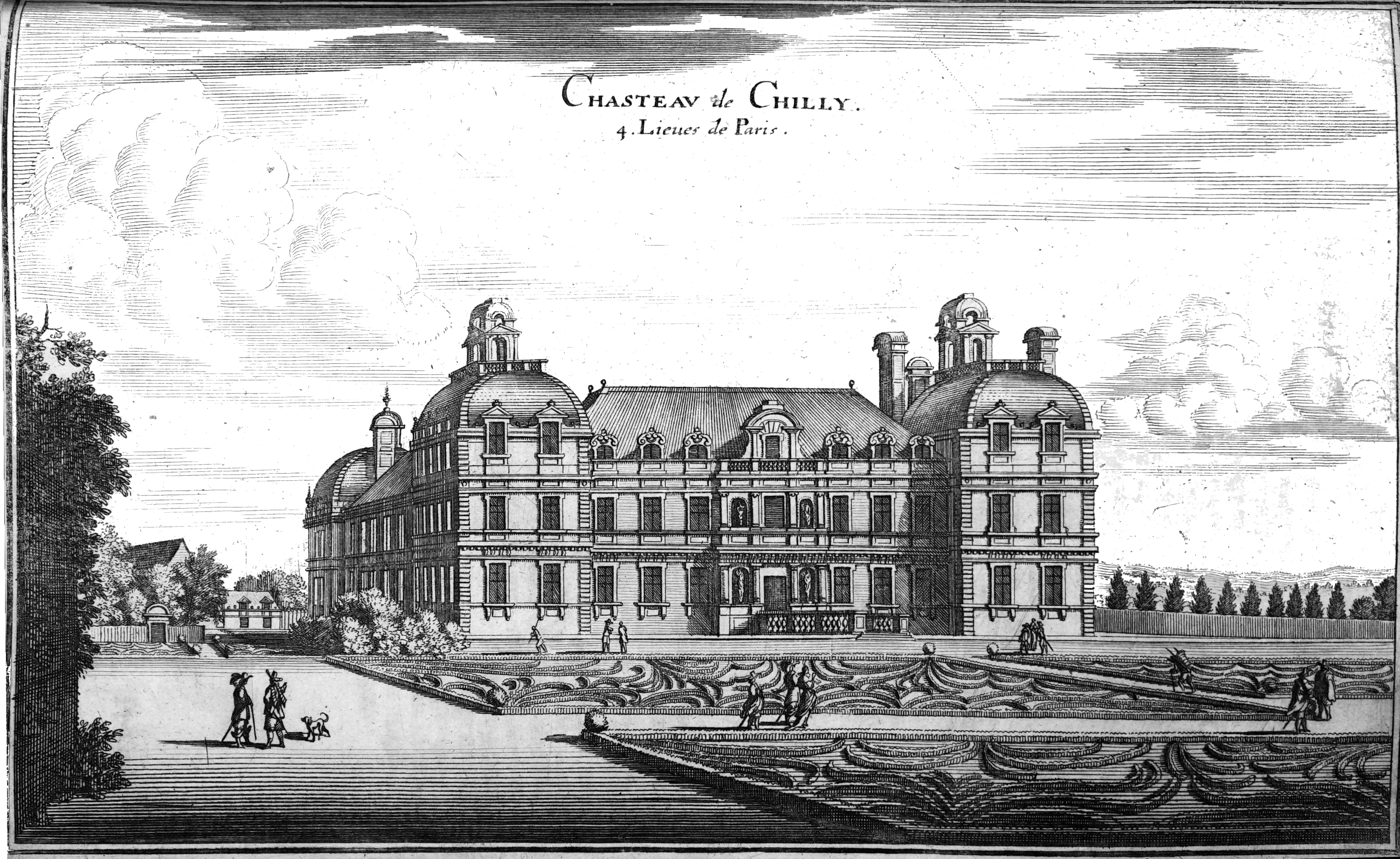
Chilly Castle in 1657. Excerpt from the Topographia Galliæ.

It was his grandfather and namesake, Antoine Coëffier de Ruzé d'Effiat, who in 1624 obtained the erection of Chilly and Longjumeau into a marquisate and then launched the construction of Château de Chilly, which was continued by his widow, Marie de Fourcy. Louis XIV spent several nights there during the Marquis d'Effiat's youth. Antoine II Coëffier de Ruzé d'Effiat inherited the seigneury of Montrichard from his mother. He organized hunts there, to which he gave particular splendor.

In the mid-1660s, the Marquis d'Effiat entered the household of Monsieur (Philippe d'Orléans), brother of Louis XIV, where he obtained the enviable positions of premier écuyer and grand veneur. His wife, Marie-Anne Olivier de Leuville, became governess to Monsieur's children in December 1679, but did not hold this position for long, dying in February 1684.

Monsieur appointed the Marquis d'Effiat governor of his châtellenies of Dourdan and Montargis. Effiat became governor of the latter town around 1691 and remained so until he died in 1719. He liked to stay there and, as in Montrichard, to hunt in the forest of Montargis, as Saint-Simon, who disliked him and despised his family origins, too recent nobility according to him, points out:

Effiat lived as a boy, very rich, very inaccessible, very fond of hunting, and had the pack of Monsieur, and after him [that] of M. le Duc d'Orléans, who had no use for them; six or seven months of the year in Montargis, or in his lands almost alone, and seeing only obscure people, very particular, and also obscure in Paris, with creatures of the same kind; sometimes debuting in good company, as he was only good with his grisettes and his complaisants. He was a rather small man, dry, well-built, upright, clean, with a blond wig, a shaggy face, very glorious, polite with the world, and who had a great deal of the language and bearing of it.

Fontenelle seems to have had a very different opinion of the Marquis d'Effiat. Indeed, in 1692, the Recueil des plus belles pièces des poètes français tant anciens que modernes (Collection of the finest works by French poets, both ancient and modern), of which Fontenelle was most certainly the author, was dedicated to the Marquis d'Effiat. The dedication states that Effiat is "the man in the world most capable of [...] knowing all the beauties [of this book]". Further on, the author states:

I am thinking here only of the accuracy of your discernment and the finesse of your taste [...]. Some of the most agreeable Authors who have entered this Collection have had the honour of being in a private company with you & I owe you even the greater part of their Works, which they have done for you or which they have entrusted to you.

The Marquis d'Effiat was a courtier, housed in the Princes' Wing at the Palace of Versailles, in a five-room apartment with three rooms above. These apartments were later allocated to Louis XIV's valet de chambre, Alexandre Bontemps. On December 31, 1688, Effiat was appointed Knight of the King's Orders in a large promotion. The award ceremony took place on January 1, 1689. This promotion indicated that he was appreciated by Louis XIV.

=== Monsieur's favorite and accused of poisoning ===
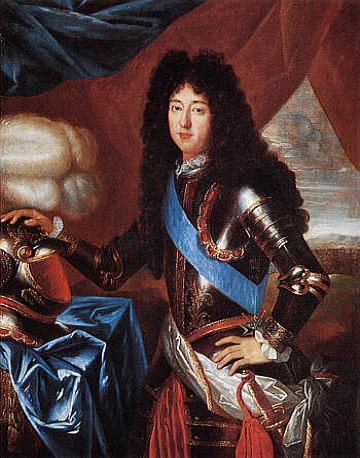
Portrait of "Monsieur", Philippe d'Orléans (1640–1701) by Henri Gascar, Musée des Beaux-Arts d'Orléans.

Along with Philippe, Chevalier de Lorraine, Effiat was one of the main favorites of Monsieur, whose homosexuality (an anachronistic term) was notorious. Although the Chevalier de Lorraine was the main lover of the Duc d'Orléans, the relationship was not exclusive, and the duo sometimes became a trio with the Marquis d'Effiat. The presence of other favorites led to disputes and reconciliations, comically described by Madame de Sévigné in her letters to her daughter dated August 9, 1675, August 12, 1675, and August 28, 1675. The angry Chevalier de Lorraine takes refuge with the Marquis d'Effiat in Chilly, before returning to court at Effiat's insistence. Saint-Simon specialist Damien Crelier considers this group of favorites, including the Marquis d'Effiat, to be composed of homosexuals for opportunism.

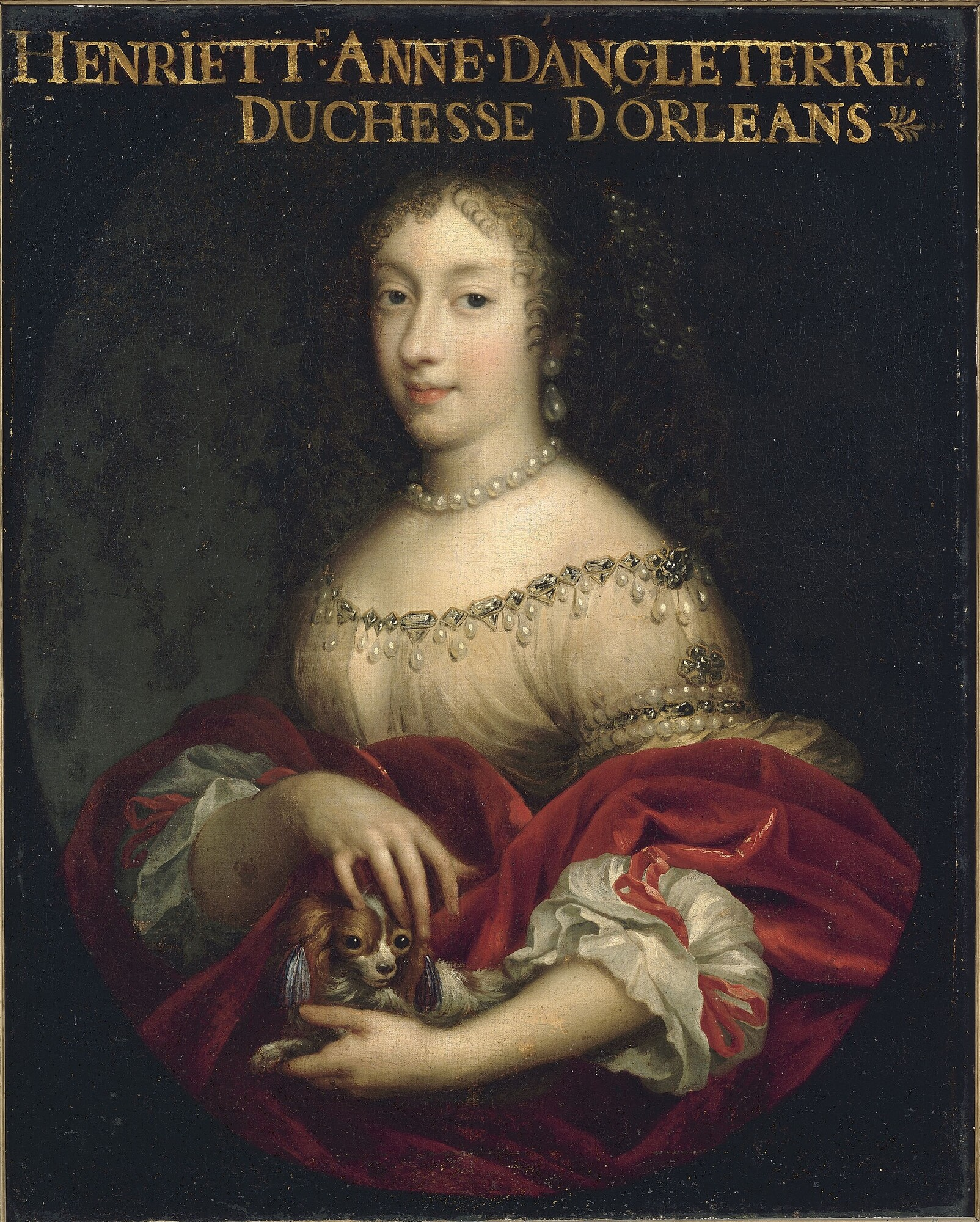
Portrait of Henrietta of England, wife of Philippe d'Orléans (1640–1701), attributed to Jean Nocret. 73 x 62 cm, Palace de Versailles.

Monsieur's favorites intrigued against the Duc d'Orléans' first wife, Henrietta of England. When she died suddenly at the age of 26 in 1670, the idea that she had been poisoned, as Henrietta herself claimed before her death, seemed to take hold at court. Louis XIV ordered an autopsy on the princess, and the doctors' report concluded that she had died of natural causes. Poisoning was not proven and, despite several hypotheses, the precise cause of death remains unknown.

However, rumors persisted that the Marquis d'Effiat was the murderer. In his Mémoires, Saint-Simon took up the rumor, claiming to have heard it from the Attorney General Joly de Fleury. Saint-Simon recalls that the Chevalier de Lorraine had been exiled by the King and that Monsieur's favorites were worried about Henrietta's favor with the King. The Marquis d'Effiat was said to have mixed poison with the chicory water drunk by the princess. To find out the truth, Louis XIV allegedly questioned Purnon, Madame's first butler, who accused the Chevalier de Lorraine of being responsible for the poisoning. As early as the 18th century, Marmontel, the king's historiographer, was suspicious of Saint-Simon's assertion. For him, "nothing in this account is believable".

The persistence of this rumor arises in the context of the poisons affair, and the crimes by poisoning committed a few years after the death of Henriette of England by the Marquise de Brinvillers; poison has been considered a feminine weapon par excellence since Antiquity.

In addition to the accusation, Saint-Simon portrays the Marquis d'Effiat as an unscrupulous schemer, while discreetly alluding to his homosexuality:

the Marquis d'Effiat was a man of great wit and manoeuvrability, who had neither soul nor principles, who lived in a disorder of morals and public irreligion, equally rich and miserly, with an ambition which always sought a way to achieve it, and to whom everything was good for that, insolent to the last point with M. le Duc d'Orléans himself, who, from the time when, with the Chevalier d'Lorraine, whose damned soul he was, he governed Monsieur, his court and often his affairs, with a rod, had become accustomed to fearing him and admiring his spirit.

=== Enemy of the Princess Palatine ===
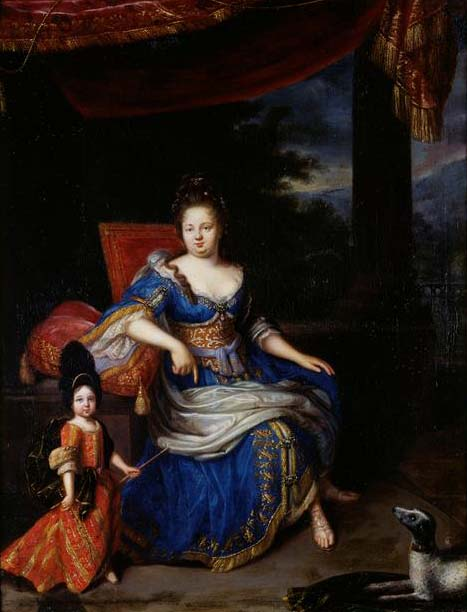
Portrait of Princess Palatine, Elisabeth-Charlotte of Bavaria (1652–1722) by Constantijn Netscher, Château of Blois.

In 1716, almost fifty years after the death of Henrietta of England, Princess Palatine, Monsieur's second wife and a close enemy of the Marquis d'Effiat, returned to the same accusations. Monsieur's favorites were said to have poisoned his first wife without telling her, for fear of her gossip. Monsieur was reputed to lack discretion and to love gossip. He was considered to be effeminate and was thus attributed to faults considered feminine. More precisely, according to the Princess Palatine, the Marquis d'Effiat was clever enough to poison the Princess's cup, which no one else touched, rather than the chicory water it contained, which could then be consumed by others.

In 1671, the Duc d'Orléans remarried to the Princess Palatine. The Marquis d'Effiat continued to exert considerable influence over the Duc d'Orléans, and his relationship with the latter's second wife was as difficult as with the first. He practices a kind of moral harassment towards Monsieur's new wife, with the Chevalier de Lorraine and a woman – who tries to pass herself off as Monsieur's mistress – called Mademoiselle and then Madame de Grancey. The latter is Elisabeth Rouxel de Médavy (1653–1711), daughter of Marshal de Grancey. In 1682, they tried to discredit the Princess Palatine in her husband's eyes by spreading the rumor that she was having an affair which she had to defend.

In 1689, Monsieur considered entrusting the governorship of his son, the Duc de Chartres, future Duc d'Orléans and Regent, to the Marquis d'Effiat. For the Princess Palatine, it was unbearable that someone she considered depraved should be responsible for her son's education. She refused and, faced with her husband's stubbornness, intervened with Louis XIV. With candor and humor, she points out the consequences of the poisoning rumor: "Whether true or false, this accusation constitutes a fine title of honor for entrusting my son to him", she writes. She also fears that the marquis will initiate her son:

This marquis is the most debauched fellow in the world, and particularly adept at debaucheries of the worst kind. If he becomes my son's governor, I can be sure he will teach him what is most horrible in the world.

Indeed, this plan has sometimes been misinterpreted as a hidden desire to steer the young Duc de Chartres towards homosexuality. In the end, the King reassured the Princess Palatine that there was no question of appointing Effiat governor to her nephew the Duc de Chartres. Nevertheless, Louis XIV used the Marquis d'Effiat's influence on the Duc d'Orléans to convince the latter to marry the Duc de Chartres to Mademoiselle de Blois, the legitimate daughter of Louis XIV and the Marquise de Montespan. The marriage took place in 1692, despite the disagreement of the Princess Palatine, for whom the marriage of her son to a bastard, even a royal one, was a disgrace. She tried to prevent it but failed. Once the decision was imposed by the king, she publicly voiced her opposition and was therefore excluded from the royal entourage. The monarch was grateful to the Marquis d'Effiat for facilitating the marriage, according to Saint-Simon:

With so many vices so opposed to the taste and character of the King and Madame de Maintenon, he was well wanted and treated with distinction, because he had taken part with the Chevalier de Lorraine in reducing Monsieur to the marriage of Monsieur his son.

In short, Saint-Simon and the Princess Palatine, who differed on many other points, shared the same dislike for the Chevalier de Lorraine and the Marquis d'Effiat. For Saint-Simon, homosexual relations, the use of poison, and support for a bastard, even a royal bastard, combine and make sense in the register of the impure. For the Princess Palatine, her husband's favorites stand in the way of her relationship with him, and she suffers from this incomplete relationship. And unlike Saint-Simon, she doesn't practice allusion, calling the Marquis d'Effiat "the biggest sodomite in France".

=== Regent's favour and member of the Polysynody ===
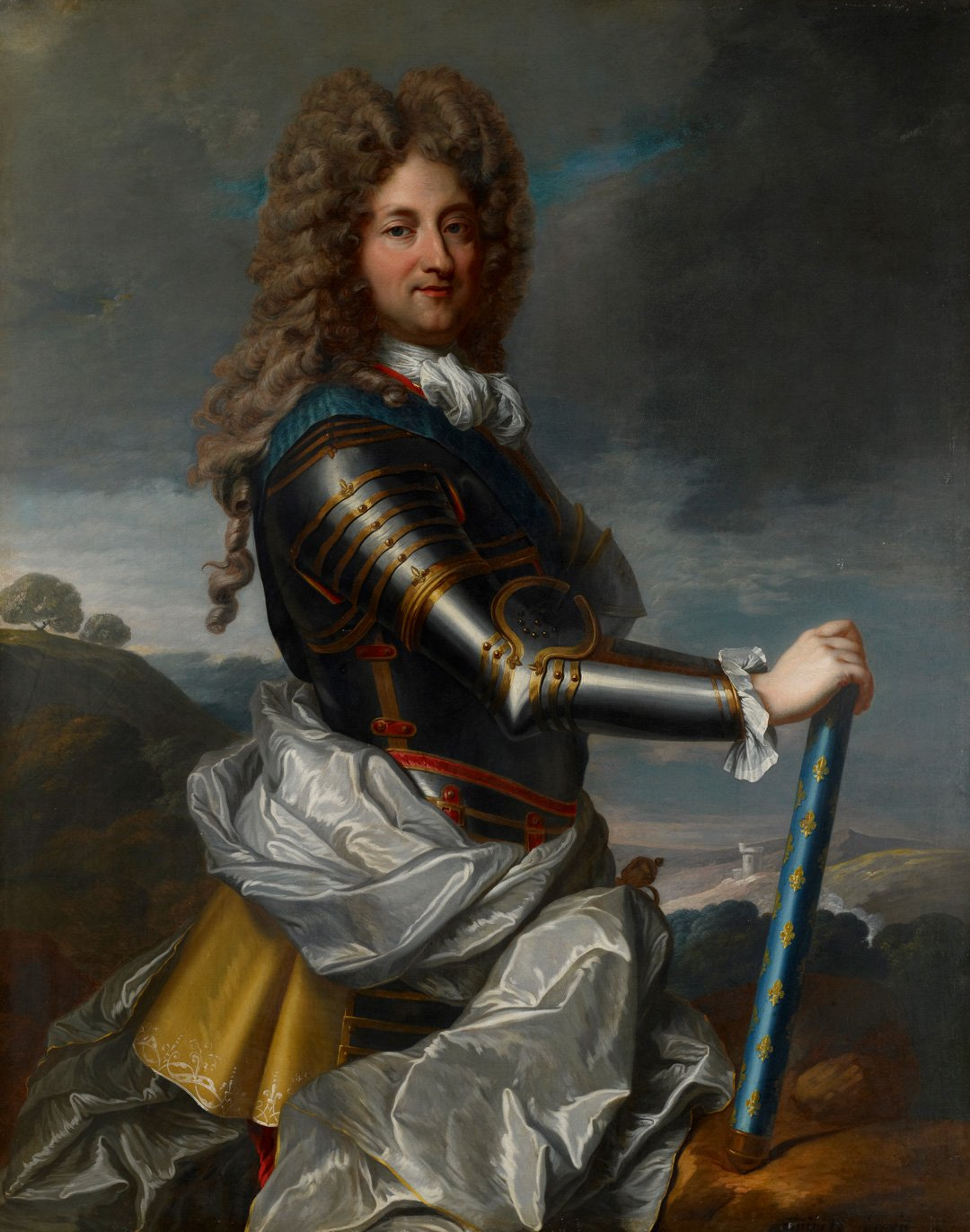
Portrait of Philippe d'Orléans (1674–1723), Regent of France, by Jean-Baptiste Santerre, Birmingham Museum and Art Gallery, circa 1710–1717.

After Monsieur died in 1701, the new Duc d'Orléans, future Regent, remained close to his father's friends, including the Marquis d'Effiat. Along with the Abbé de Grancé, the Marquis de Nesle, François-Antoine de Simiane d'Esparron, Alexandre-Philippe de Conflans and others, the Marquis d'Effiat became one of the new Duc d'Orléans' evening companions, notably at the famous "petits soupers (small dinners)", where guests ate, drank and enjoyed themselves. Under the Regency, the Marquis d'Effiat continued to attend these parties, with other guests joining in.

The Marquis d'Effiat rendered services to his protector. In 1706, he attested that a child born in 1702 to Marie Louise Madeleine Victoire d'Argenton, daughter-in-waiting of the Duchesse d'Orléans, was indeed the natural son of the Duc d'Orléans. This child was baptized in Chilly in 1706 as Jean Philippe d'Orléans, then recognized by his father.

When Louis XIV died in September 1715 and the Regency was established, the Marquis d'Effiat tried unsuccessfully to use his influence to keep his relative Jérôme Phélypeaux de Pontchartrain's position as Secretary of State for the Navy and the King's Household. He failed, but his efforts were instrumental in transferring part of Jérôme de Pontchartrain's duties to his young son, Maurepas.

On September 19, 1715, as part of the Polysynodial System, the Marquis d'Effiat became vice-president of the Council of Finance, without having any qualifications in this field. The Duc d'Orléans thus rewarded him for his loyalty. The title of vice-president gave him pre-eminence over the other councillors, but did not mean he had any particular work to do. He assiduously sat on the Conseil de Finances, before leaving it when he was appointed to the Conseil de Régence in October 1716, where he was not particularly active either. He did, however, take part in the financial reform committee headed by the Duc de Noailles in 1717. The Marquis d'Effiat's presence on these bodies was mainly symbolic, without him performing any duties. Also in 1717, he was a member of an informal committee, chaired by the Regent, to consider policy in the face of the Unigenitus bull. He was particularly attached to Gallicanism.

=== Founder of the Effiat military school and hospitals ===
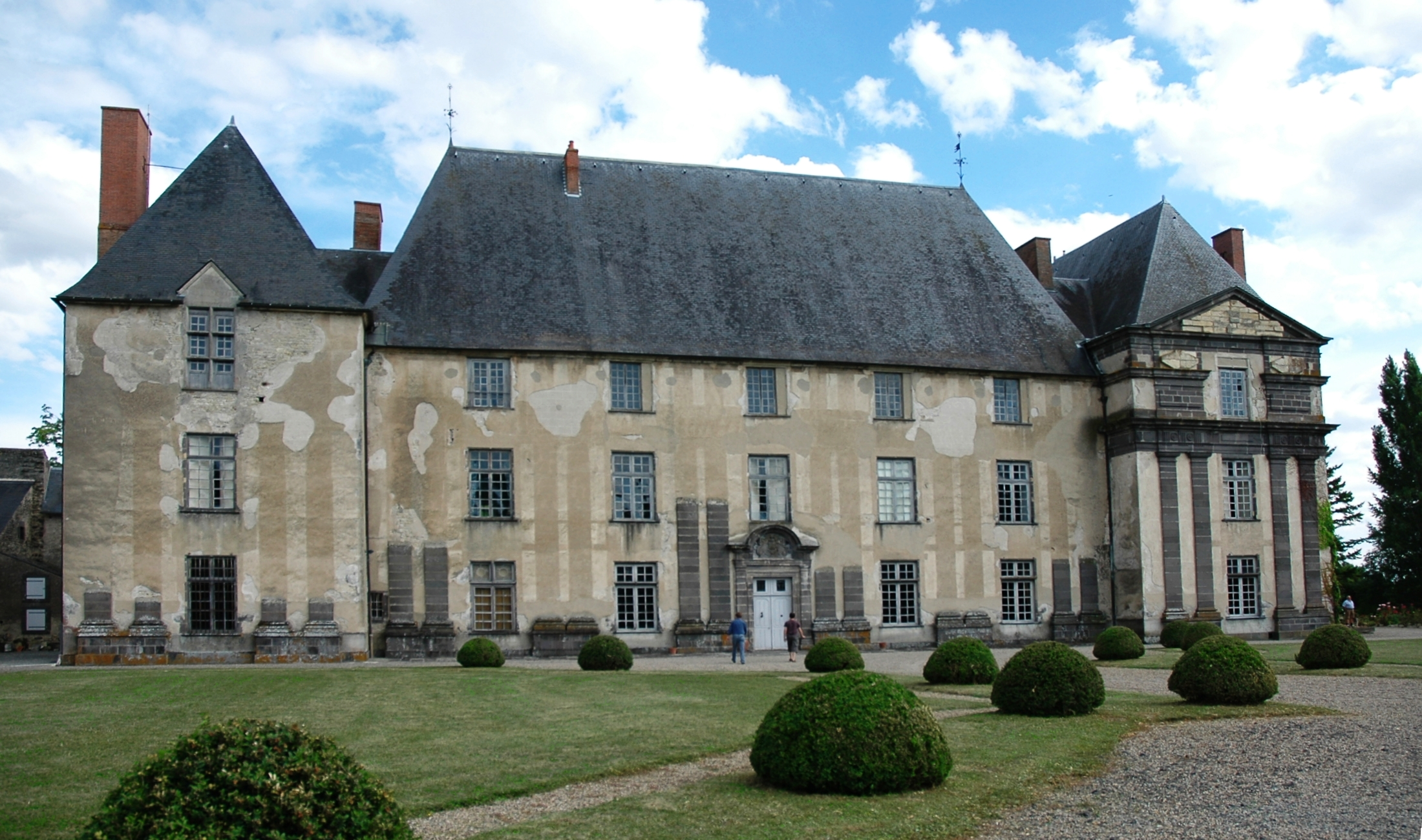
Château d'Effiat (Auvergne, now Puy-de-Dôme).

In 1627, the Marquis d'Effiat's grandfather and namesake, Antoine Coëffier de Ruzé d'Effiat, had installed the Oratorians in Effiat, having the necessary buildings constructed for them and endowing them with a substantial donation. The Oratorians thus continued to settle in Auvergne, where they had already been established in Clermont and Riom since 1618.

In 1714, his grandson Antoine II made two important bequests. He bequeathed 60,000 livres to create a school for six poor gentlemen from Auvergne, to be taught literature, philosophy, blazon, geography, and mathematics from the age of seven to eighteen. He thus founded the Royal Military School of Effiat, which lasted until 1793 and whose most famous pupil was General Desaix. The second bequest was for 50,000 livres to house and maintain twelve local poor.

The same year, 1714, he founded a hospice in Chilly and bequeathed it 30,000 livres. In 1719, under his will, he founded another hospital in another of his seigneuries, Montrichard. He bequeathed his house to the hospital and endowed it with 20,000 livres.

The Marquis d'Effiat died in Paris on 2 or 3 June 1719, without issue. The Princess Palatine writes:

Yesterday an octogenarian died in Paris. May God forgive him for the evil he did to me during the thirty years I lived with my lord. He is the Marquis d'Effiat.

He is buried in the church of Effiat except for his heart, which is buried in Chilly. This branch of the Coëffier de Ruzé family died out with him, and his inheritance passed to the family of the Dukes of Mazarin.

== Coat of arms and decoration ==
=== Coat of arms ===

Gules, a chevron fess-wavy Argent and Azure of six pieces, acc. to three lions Or (arms of Mathieu Ruzé, taken over by Antoine Coëffier) On these coats of arms, the chevron and orientation of the lions may be questionable. The coat of arms shown here is the most likely.

=== Decoration ===
Knight of the Order of the Holy Spirit (promotion of December 31, 1688, awarded on January 1, 1689).

== Portrayals in media ==
Antoine, Marquis d'Effiat has been portrayed in:

- Vatel (2000 film), played by Jérôme Pradon

== See also ==
- Antoine Coiffier de Ruzé, marquis d'Effiat
- Philippe I, Duke of Orléans
- Henrietta of England
- Elizabeth Charlotte, Madame Palatine
- Philippe II, Duke of Orléans
- Philippe, Chevalier de Lorraine
- List of knights of the Order of the Holy Spirit

== Bibliography ==
- Bély, Lucien (2019). Les secrets de Louis XIV. Mystères d'État et pouvoir absolu. Texto (in French) (1st ed.). Paris: Tallandier. ISBN 979-10-210-3975-9.
- Crelier, Damien (2014). "Saint-Simon et le «goût italien» : l'homosexualité dans les Mémoires". Cahiers Saint Simon (in French). 42 (1). Cahiers Saint-Simon: 47–60. doi:10.3406/simon.2014.1533.
- Dupilet, Alexandre (2020). Le Régent. Philippe d'Orléans l'héritier du Roi-Soleil (in French). Paris: Tallandier. ISBN 979-10-210-0143-5.
- Frostin, Charles (2006). es Pontchartrain, ministres de Louis XIV : Alliances et réseau d'influence sous l'Ancien Régime. Histoire (in French). Rennes: Presses universitaires de Rennes. ISBN 978-2-7535-3211-3.
- Labreuille, Abbé (October 1897). Etude historique sur Montrichard et Nanteuil (suite) (in French). Bulletin de la société académique du Centre.
- Plaisance, Daniel (1985). Un gouverneur de Montargis, le marquis d'Effiat (in French). Bulletin de la société d'émulation de l'arrondissement de Montargis.
- Risch, Léon (1934). Le vieux Chilly (in French). Revue de l'histoire de Versailles et de Seine-et-Oise.
- Spangler, Jonathan (2022). Monsieur. Second Sons in the Monarchy of France, 1550–1800. Routledge. ISBN 978-1-000-48290-4.
