= Martin Ruzé de Beaulieu =

French politician (c. 1526–1613)

Martin Ruzé, Lord of Beaulieu of Longjumeau and Chilly (c. 1526, in Tours – 6 November 1613, in Paris) was a French politician of the late sixteenth and early seventeenth century, who was Secretary of State of the Maison du Roi (or King's Secretary) under Henry III of France, Henry IV of France and Louis XIII.

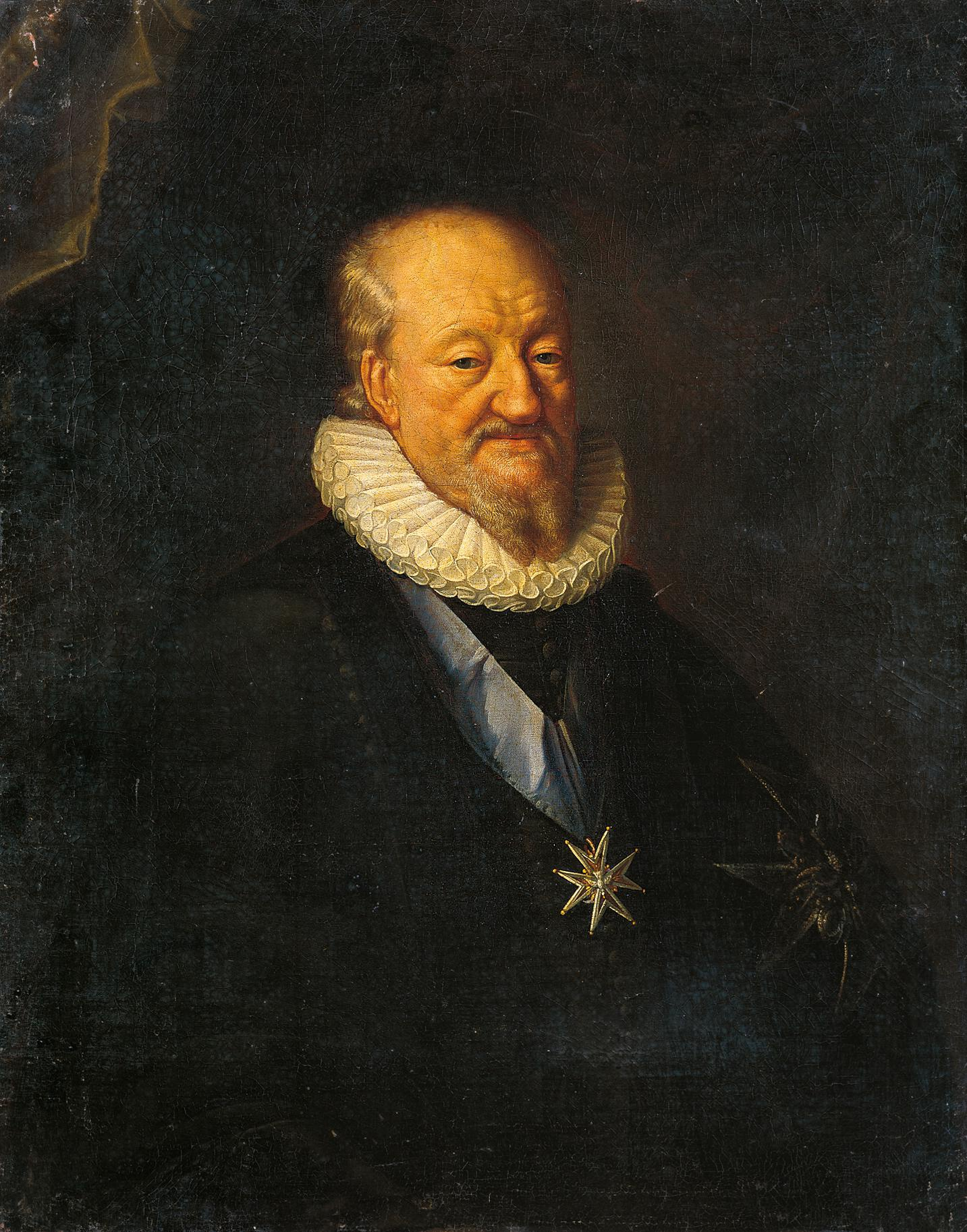
Image of Martin Ruzé, was a French politician

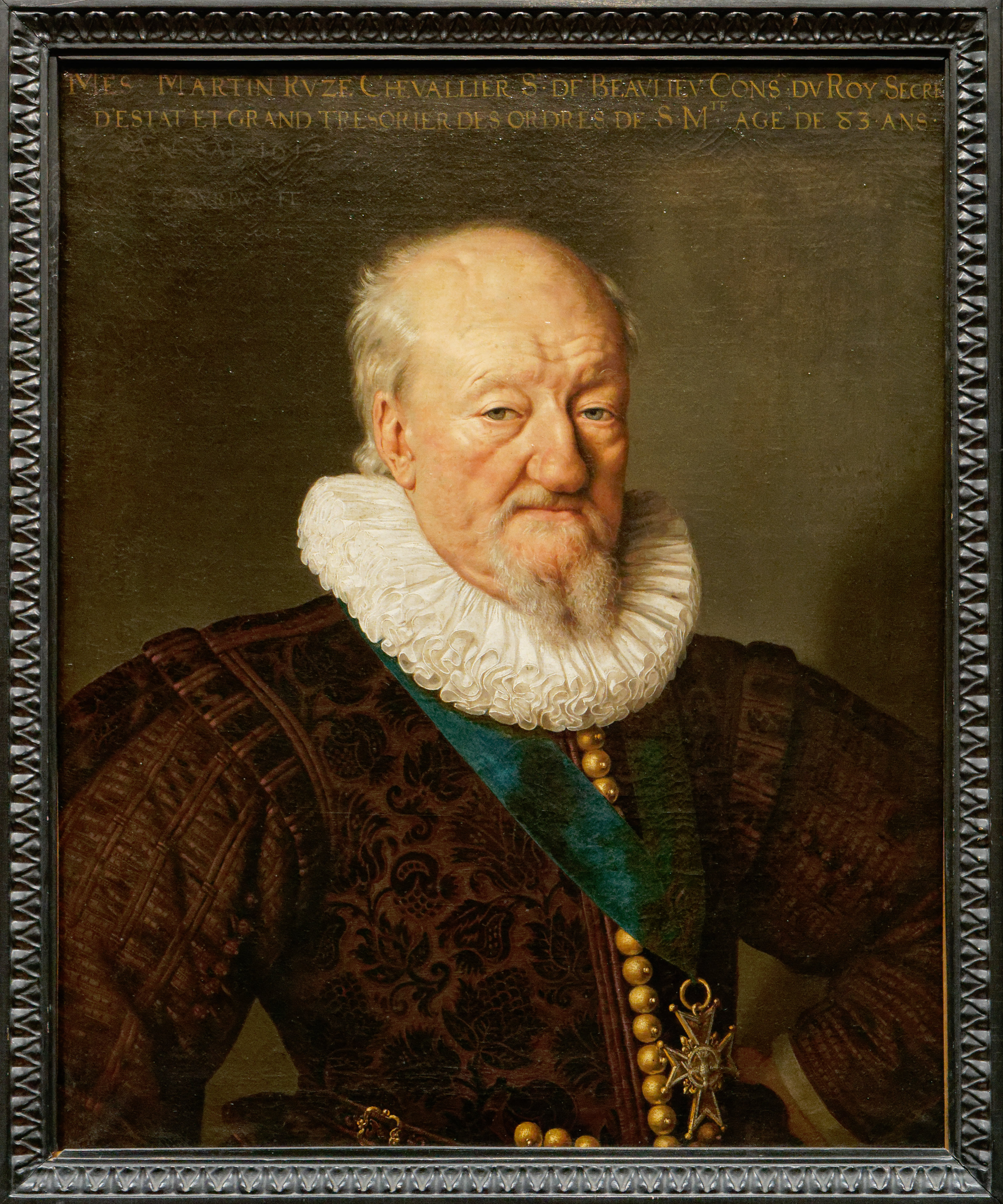
Portrait of Martin Ruzé

== Biography ==
Martin Ruzé was the son of William Ruzé, adviser to the Parliament, and Catherine Briconnet. William was the son of another William Ruzé, Lord of Beaulieu, Receiver General of Touraine, Mayor of Tours in 1534, and had a brother, also named William Ruzé (born about 1520; died 28 September 1587), who was confessor and adviser of kings Henry II, Charles IX and Henri III, and who was appointed bishop of Saint-Malo 1570, then bishop of Angers on 29 August 1572.

Martin began his career in the entourage of the king in 1551, starting with Henry II. From 1571 to 1588 he was general superintendent of ammunition and food. In 1573-1574 he was secretary to the King of Poland and in that capacity, he countersigned and raised the royal seal on the letters of King. In August 1574 he was appointed fifth secretary of state.

On 25 September 1576, Martin Ruzé became King Henry's Secretary of Finance, and adviser to the King and to the Queen Mother (Catherine de Medici). In 1578, after the resignation of Louis Valleé, he was provided with the load controller of the Chancellery. On 10 April 1589, he became Grand Treasurer of the Order of the Holy Spirit to replace the former Secretary of State Nicolas de Neufville, seigneur de Villeroy (who had resigned in disgrace), and retained that office until his death. On 15 April 1589, Ruzé installed, for King Henry III, Philippe de Mornay in the office of Governor of Saumur. The ceremony took place in front of the arbor: Florent Lessart, the former governor, faithful to Henry III brought the keys of the city, but out of spite and shame, he dropped to the ground. It is the king's secretary, who then picked up and presented them to the new governor.

In 1596, Ruzé bought land at Longjumeau from Michel III de Gaillard. Having no children, he bequeathed his property to Antoine Coëffier de Ruzé, Marquis Effiat, his nephew, who later became Superintendent of Finances (1626) and Marshal of France (1631). In 1601, during the reign of Henry IV, Ruzé was appointed Grand Master of Mining and Pierre de Beringhen comptroller-general. Sully ordered them to form a committee to study and conduct excavations in the kingdom of France. On 3 March 1606 Henri IV enlisted Antoine de Loménie, to relieve the elderly Ruzé in his tasks as adviser to the King, as Cabinet Secretary, and as royal chief clerk. Ruzé established a will on 26 August 1609 for his nephew and heir Antoine Coëffier de Ruzé d'Effiat, on condition of taking the name and arms of Ruzé.

Ruzé died on 6 November 1613. His black marble tomb, topped by a statue of Ruzé kneeling, can be seen in the church of Saint-Etienne in Chilly-Mazarin.

Political offices
Preceded by Claude Pinard	Minister for the Maison du Roi; 1588-1613	Succeeded by Louis de Revol
Preceded by Jacques Bourdin	Minister of the Navy and the Colonies; 15 September 1588 - 6 November 1613	Succeeded by Antoine de Loménie
