= Étienne Soulange-Bodin =

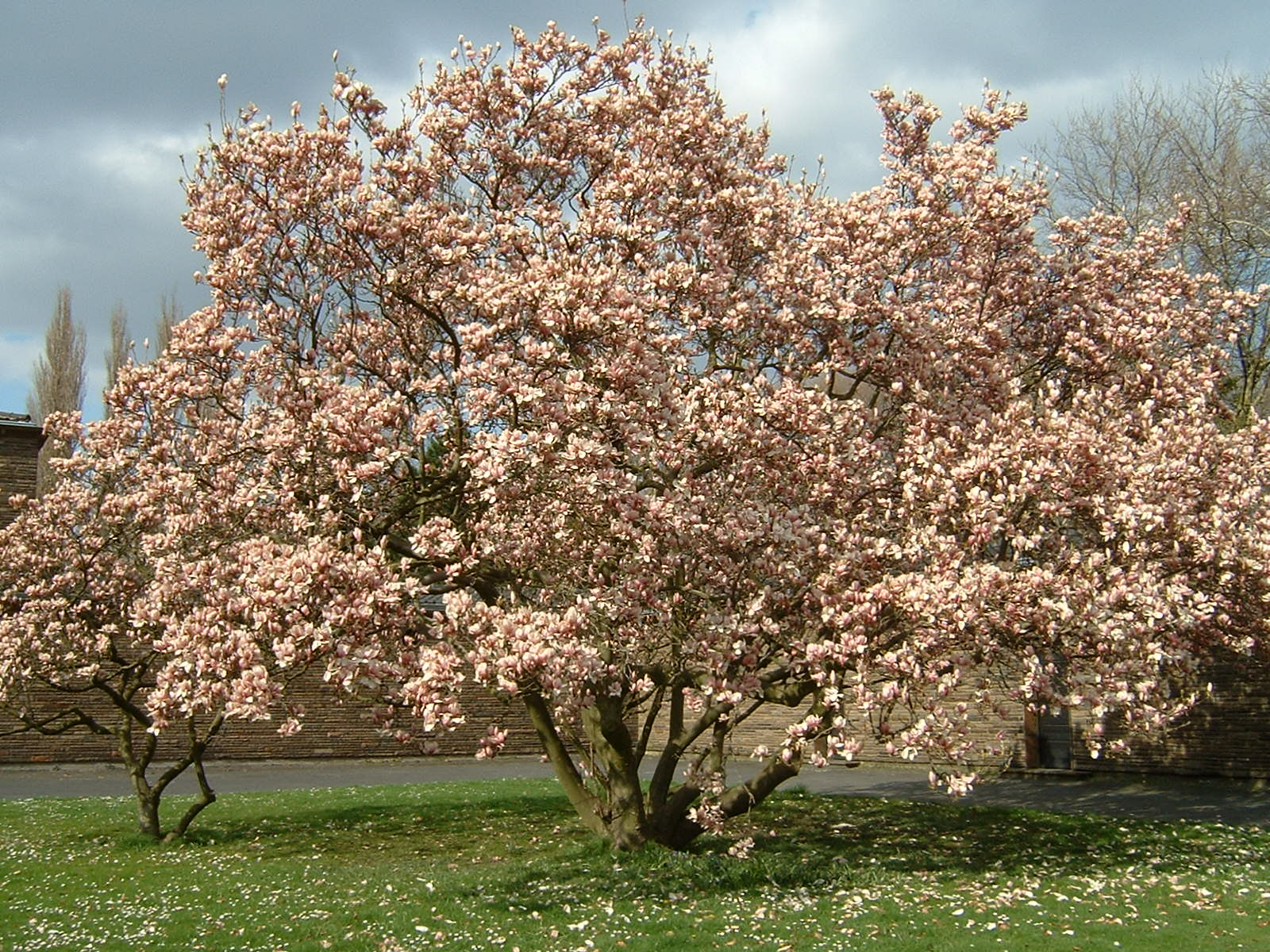
Magnolia × soulangeana

Étienne Soulange-Bodin (1774–1846) was the French biologist botanist and army officer who is commemorated by his hybrid magnolia, Magnolia × soulangeana. Though he is otherwise scarcely remembered today, he played a major role in the organization of professional horticulture in France, 1815–1845.

Born at Tours (Indre-et-Loire), he initially followed a course in medicine and grounded himself in the still closely related field of botany. In 1796, he served for a year as secretary to the French embassy to Constantinople, and then fulfilled several administrative functions upon his return to France. In 1807, he was nominated Intendant in the cabinet of advisors to prince Eugène de Beauharnais, viceroy of Italy, whom he followed in his diplomatic campaigns. Napoleon conferred upon him the cross of the Légion d'honneur and that of the Iron Cross.

In 1814, Mr. Soulange-Bodin retired to France after the first exile of Napoleon. His Beauharnais service subsequently recommended him for superintendence of the gardens at Empress Josephine's Malmaison. He purchased the 70 hectare château de Fromont at Ris-Orangis (Essonne), where he laid out what was virtually a botanical garden, which gained him the breadth of horticultural experience that informed his publications. He planted an arboretum of exotic trees and amassed a collection of brooms, which were at the time little employed in horticulture. He then assembled every new vegetable he could find, raising the quality of the gardens to the highest level set by the English at Kew. founded an Institut horticole, which Charles X declared royal on the occasion of a state visit in 1829; it dissolved with the Revolution of 1830, but Soulange-Bodin remained a member, and then perpetual secretary of the Société royale d'agriculture. He was a founder of the Société d'horticulture de Paris, and organised the first of the floral expositions at the Louvre (1832).

He died at the Château de Fromont in 1846.

Among his publications are his Notice sur une nouvelle espèce de magnolia (Paris, 1826), which brought M. x soulangeana to wide attention, a Discours sur l'importance de l'horticulture (Paris, 1826), his annual catalogues of the plants at Fromont, published from 1822, the editing of the Annales de l'institut royal horticole de Fromont (Paris, 1829–1834), a Catalogue des dahlias nains d'origine anglaise (Paris, 1831) and a Rapport sur le reboisement des montagnes (Paris, 1842), recommending afforestation of high slopes too steep for effective agriculture.

== Additional Sources ==
Quérard, J.M., (1838). La France littéraire, ou Dictionnaire bibliographique des savants... volume 9: 221
