= Antoine de Loménie =

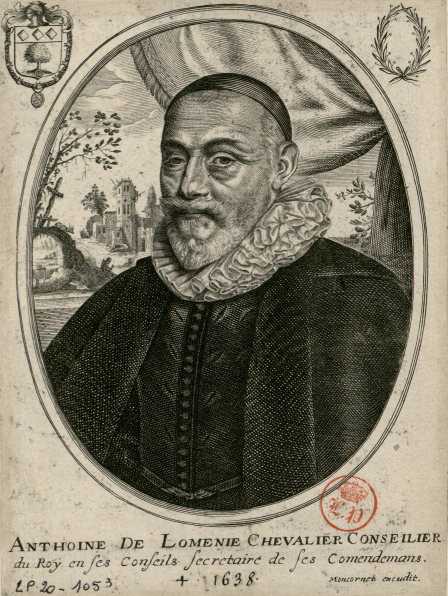
Antoine de Loménie.png

Antoine de Lomenie, lord of La Ville-aux-Clerics (1560 - 17 January 1638 Paris) was a Secretary of the Navy under Louis XIII of 7 November 1613 to 10 August 1615, and Ambassador Extraordinary of France to England.

He was the son of Martial Lomenie, Seigneur de Versailles (†1572 in the St. Bartholomew's Day massacre, Paris) and Jacqueline Pinault.

He was Secrétaire d'État of Navarre 1595–1613.

He was, in the judgment of Adina Ruiu, "a disciple and an old friend of the Jesuits for whom he never missed a chance to do a favor".

He married on 1 October 1593 with Anne of Aubourg, lady Porcheux 1608; they had children:

- Henri-Auguste de 1595-1666 Lomenie
- Catherine Henriette 1667
- Marie Antoinette

Political offices
Preceded by Martin Ruze	Minister of the Navy and the Colonies; 7 November 1613 - 10 August 1615	Succeeded by Henri Auguste de Loménie
