= Château de Fromont =

Town hall in Ris-Orangis, France

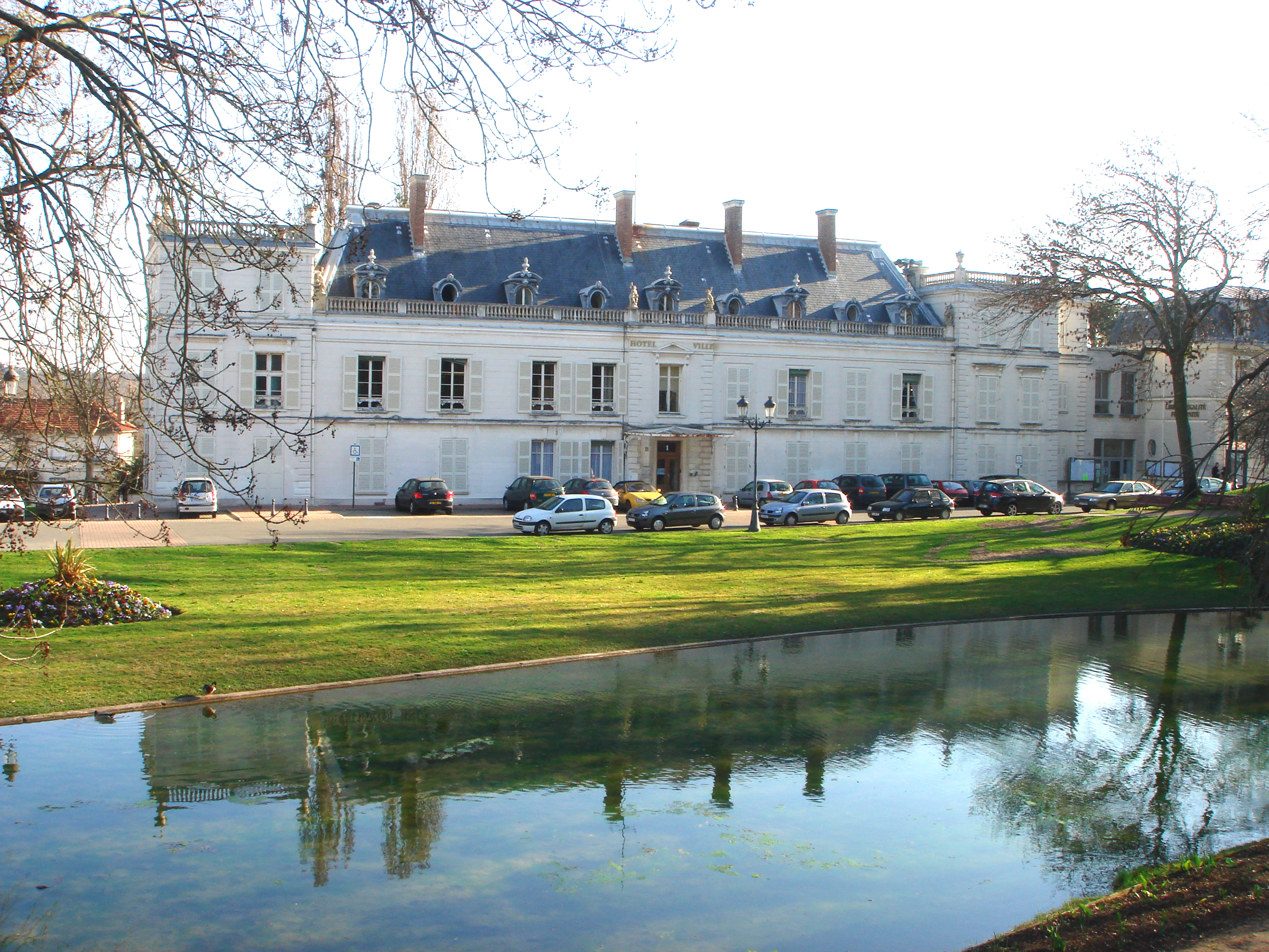
- The main frontage of the Château de Fromont in March 2009
- Interactive map of the Château de Fromont area

General information
- Type: City hall
- Architectural style: Neoclassical style
- Location: Ris-Orangis, France
- Coordinates: 48.6538°N 2.4159°E
- Completed: c.1700

The Château de Fromont, known previously as the Château de Frémont, is a municipal building in Ris-Orangis, Essonne, in the southern suburbs of Paris, standing on Place du Général-de-Gaulle.

== History ==
=== Early history ===
The site was owned by the Knights Templar from at least the mid-13th century. After the order was disbanded, King Philip VI donated the land to the Abbey of Saint-Magloire in the mid-14th century. The building was occupied by the president of the Parlement of Paris, Jacques Auguste de Thou, from 1574 and then by his son, François Auguste de Thou, from 1617. In 1642, following the execution of François Auguste de Thou for treason in the conspiracy of Cinq-Mars, the Château de Fromont was purchased by Arnoul de Nouveau. It was then inherited by his son, Jérosme de Nouveau, an advisor to Louis XIV.

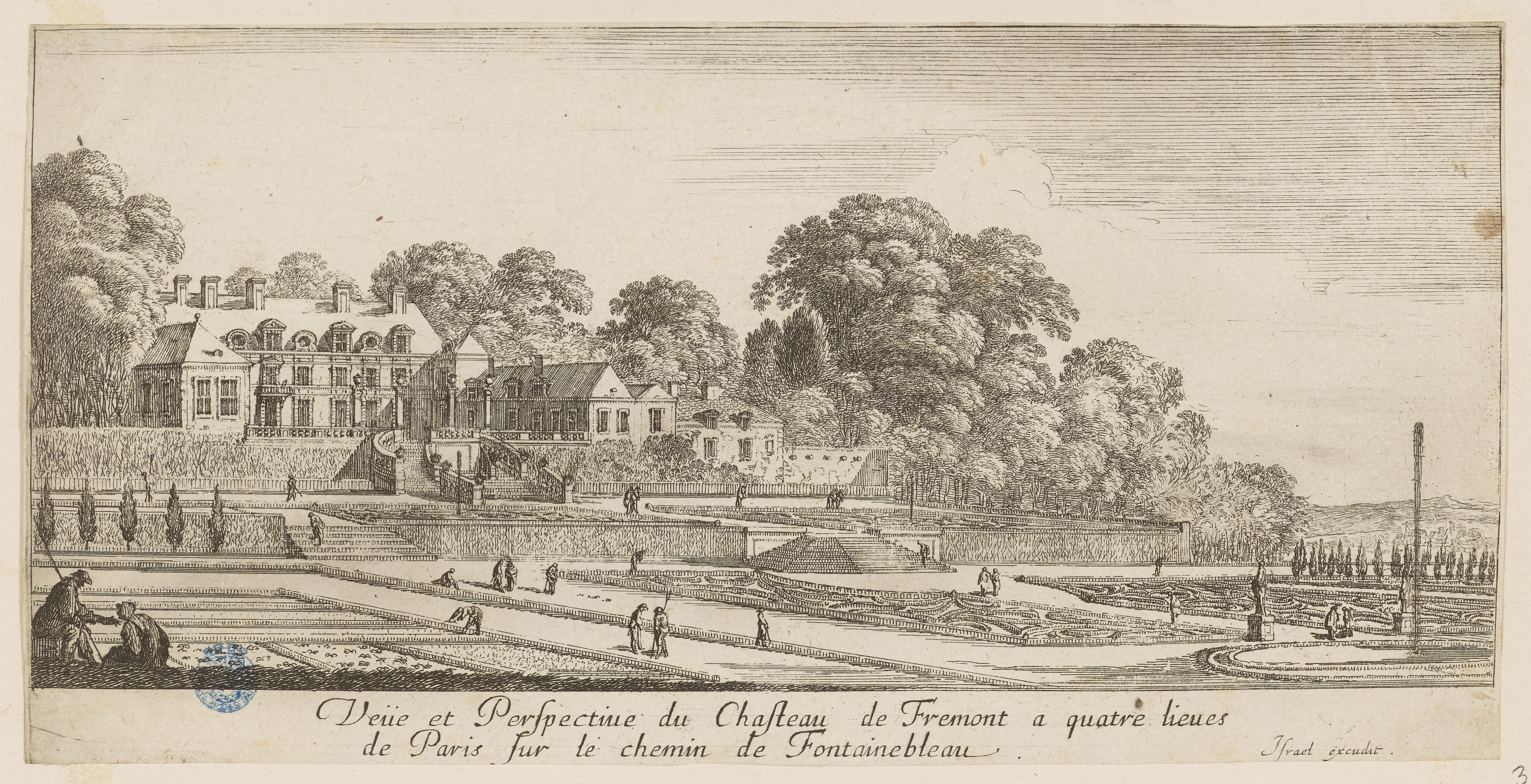
The Château de Fromont in the mid-to-late 17th century, by Israel Silvestre and Israel Henriet

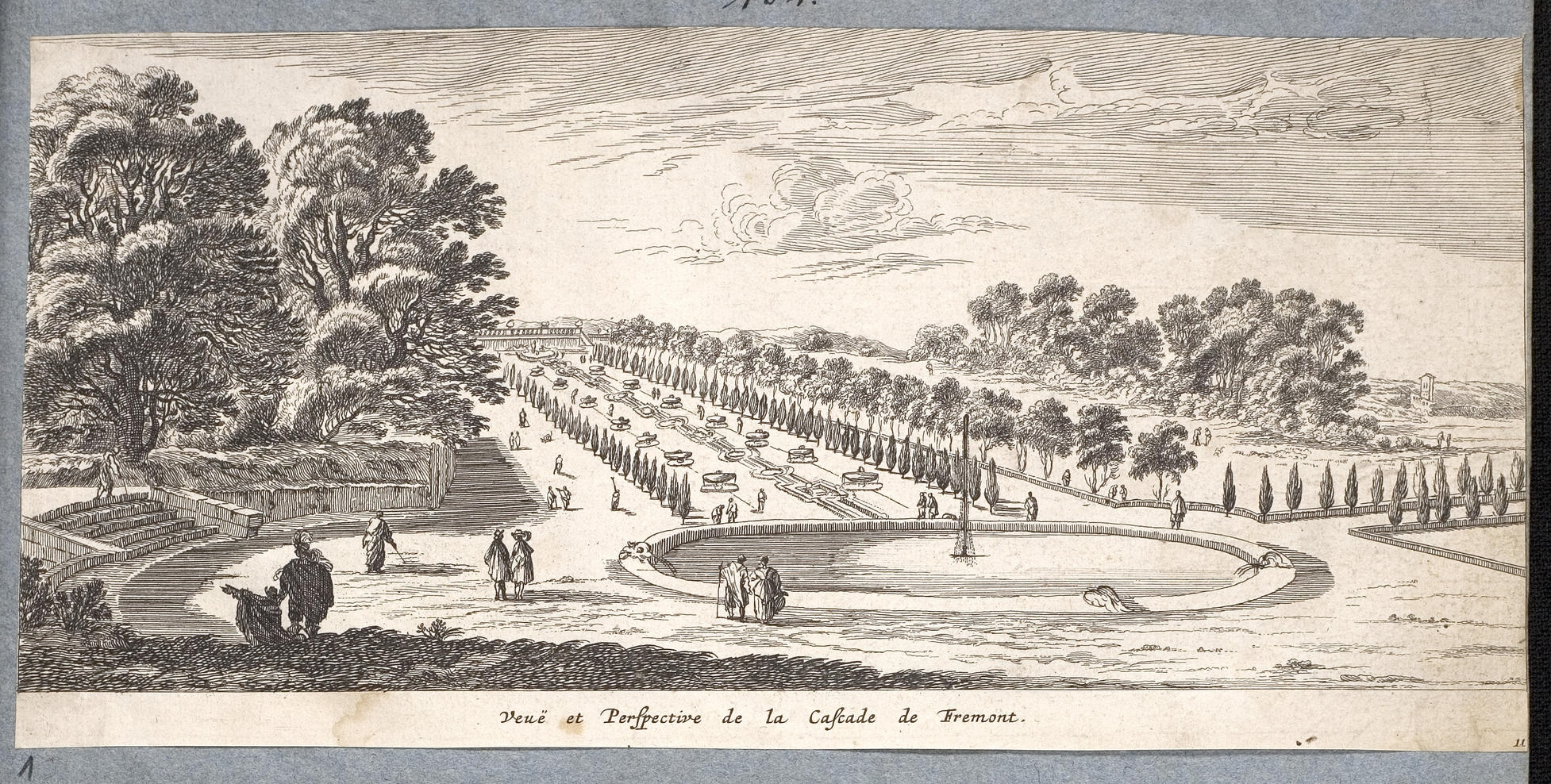
The gardens of the Château de Fromont in the mid-to-late seventeenth century, by Israel Silvestre and Israel Henriet

In 1687, the château was acquired by Philippe, Chevalier de Lorraine, prince étranger and favourite lover of Philippe I, Duke of Orléans, the king's brother. Philippe de Lorraine commissioned the current building in the late 17th century; it was designed in the neoclassical style, built in ashlar stone and was completed around 1700. The design involved a main block with two wings which were projected towards the river Seine. The garden was designed by André Le Nôtre and completed in 1715. After the death of Philippe de Lorraine in 1702, the château passed to Louis Alexandre de Bourbon, Count of Toulouse, the third legitimized son of Louis XIV and his mistress Françoise-Athénaïs, Marquise of Montespan.

=== 19th century ===
The botanist, Étienne Soulange-Bodin, acquired the building and founded the first French school of horticulture there in 1829. It then became the property of the composer, Fromental Halévy, in 1847, before passing to his brother-in-law, Hippolyte Rodrigues, in 1862.

=== 20th century ===
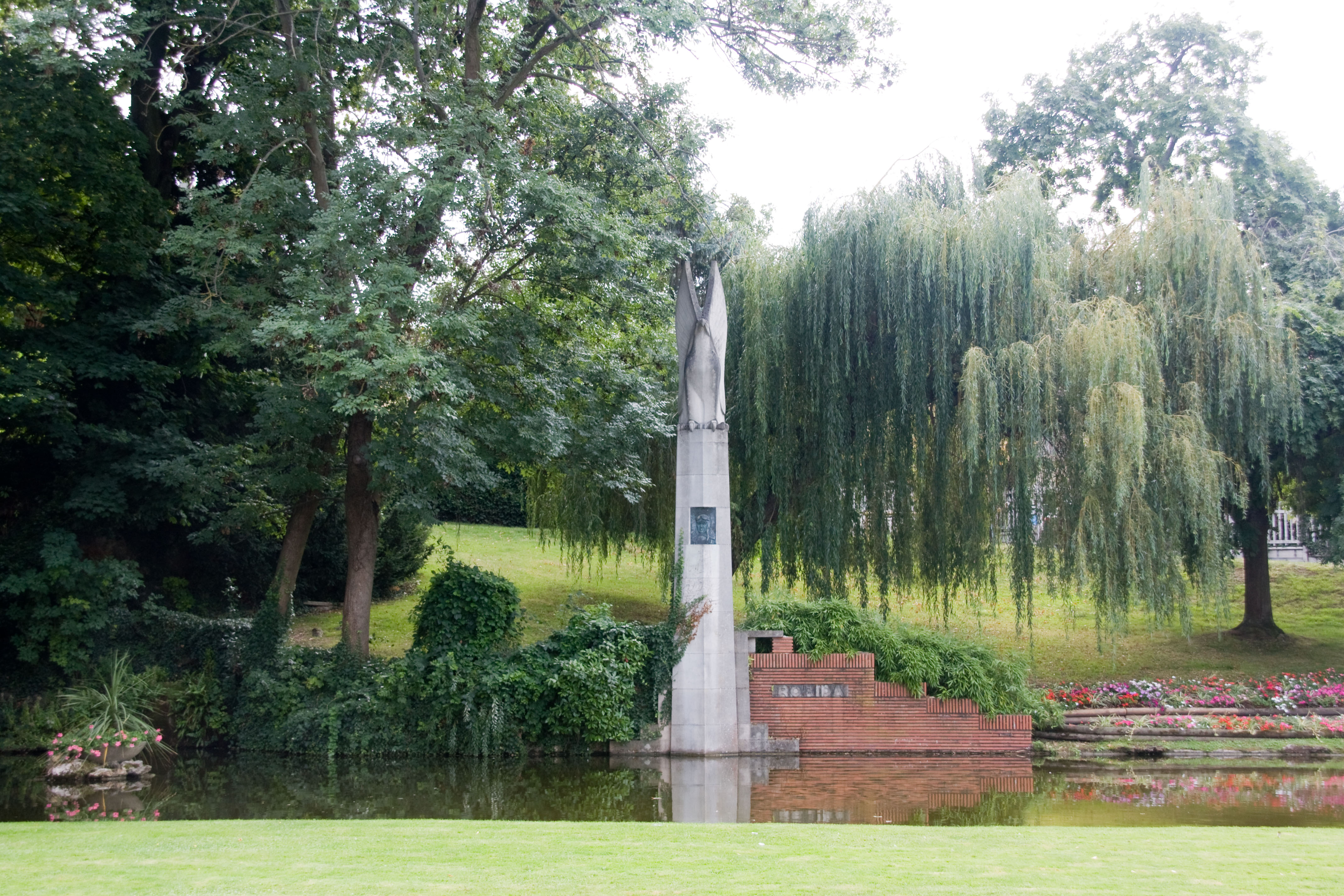
Monument to Henri Robida

After another succession of private owners, the Château de Fromont was acquired by the municipality of Ris-Orangis in the mid-1920s. Following significant population growth, the town council led by the mayor, Albert Rémy, had decided that they required a larger building to replace their small, purpose-built town hall on the corner of Rue du Clos and Rue de Paris (now Rue Albert Rémy). They chose the Château de Fromont. After the building had been converted for municipal use, it was reopened by the minister of the interior, Albert Sarraut, on 10 July 1927.

A monument to commemorate the life of the aviator Henri Robida was installed on the edge of the pond in front of the building and unveiled by then-mayor Jules Boulesteix in October 1934. Following the liberation of Ris-Orangis by American troops on 26 August 1944, during the Second World War, a group from the French Resistance seized the town hall and removed the Vichy regime mayor, Louis Kany, from his post.
