= Antoine Coiffier de Ruzé, marquis d'Effiat =

French noble and Superintendent of Finances (1581–1632)

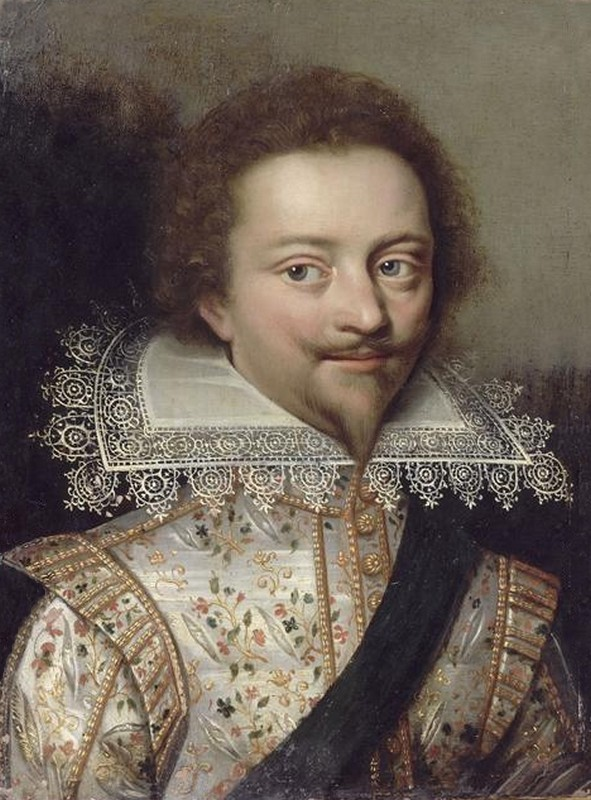

Antoine Coiffier (or Coëffier) de Ruzé d'Effiat, marquis d'Effiat, (1581- 7 July 1632) was a French noble and Superintendent of Finances to Louis XIII during the years 1626 to 1632. He was also a Marshal of France.

== Biography ==
As the nephew of Martin Ruzé de Beaulieu (died in 1613), who was the Secretary of State of the Maison du Roi under three kings of France, he came to court quite quickly. Due to Louis XIII's sympathy for Beaulieu, he easily gained the king's favour.

By 1616, he was already First Gentleman of the king's stable. When Charles de La Vieuville was Superintendent of Finances, he was his assistant. When Cardinal Richelieu entered the King's Council in 1624, Effiat quickly became someone the Cardinal could trust.

Thanks to the pleadings of the cardinal, Effiat entered the council the same year and was appointed ambassador extraordinary to England and tasked with negotiating the marriage of the Prince of Wales (later Charles I) with the sister of the king of France's, Henrietta Maria of France.

After Michel Marillac's transfer from Superintendent of Finances to Keeper of the Seals, the job of superintendent was offered to Effiat, due to the Richelieu's trust in him. Following a treaty with Lorraine, Effiat was sent with an army to secure the fortresses of Clermont-en-Argonne, Stenay, and Jamets, along with towns placed under Louis XIII's protection by the elector of Trier.

He is perhaps known best as the father of Henri Coiffier de Ruzé, Marquis of Cinq-Mars, Louis XIII's male favourite.

== See also ==
- Antoine II Coëffier de Ruzé
