= Lycée Pierre Mendès France (Ris-Orangis) =

Senior high school in France

Lycée Pierre Mendès France is a senior high school in Ris-Orangis, Essonne, France, in the Paris metropolitan area. As of 2016 there are 550 students.
