= Philippe, Chevalier de Lorraine =

Philippe
- Chevalier de Lorraine
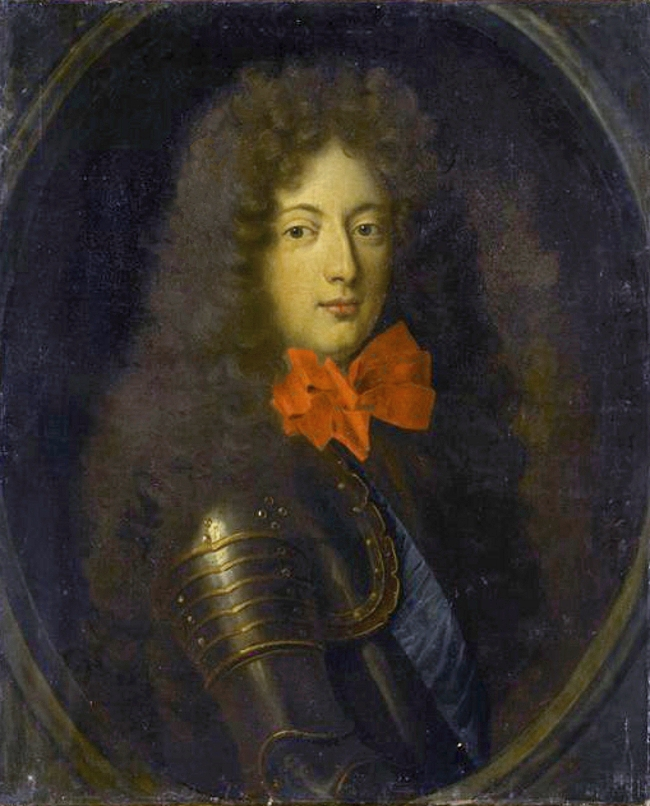
- Portrait by an unknown artist
- Born: 28 September 1643; Paris, Kingdom of France
- Died: 8 December 1702 (aged 59); Palais-Royal, Paris, Kingdom of France
- Issue Detail: Alexandre or Alexis, Chevalier de Beauvernois
Names
- Philippe de Lorraine
- House: Guise; Lorraine
- Father: Henri de Lorraine, Count of Harcourt
- Mother: Marguerite-Philippe du Cambout

Philippe de Lorraine (28 September 1643 – 8 December 1702), known as the chevalier de Lorraine, was a French nobleman and the favourite lover of Philippe I, Duke of Orléans, brother of Louis XIV. He was a descendant of the Dukes of Elbeuf and a member of the House of Guise, a cadet branch of the ducal House of Lorraine, and therefore held the rank of prince étranger at court. He was the commendatory abbot of Sainte-Trinité de Tiron, Saint-Jean-des-Vignes, Fleury, and Saint-Père-en-Vallée.

== Biography ==
=== Early life ===
Philippe de Lorraine was born on 28 September 1643, likely at the Hôtel du Quai Malaquais, which was the official Paris residence of the family of Henri de Lorraine, Count of Harcourt and his wife, Marguerite-Philippe du Cambout. Philippe de Lorraine's father, the count of Harcourt, had in August 1643 been given the role of Grand Squire of France, a prestigious office in charge of the royal stables, the transport of the king, and his ceremonial entourage, and was thus entitled to be referred to as Monsieur le Grand. Less than a week after Lorraine's birth, in his capacity as Grand Squire, Harcourt set out for England under the orders of Anne of Austria and Cardinal Mazarin to act as an intermediary in a dispute between Charles I of England and his parliament.

Lorraine was baptized on 6 June 1644, in the same ceremony as his elder brother, Louis, Count of Armagnac. Lorraine's godmother, Anne of Austria, then-regent of France, named him Philippe, which was the name she also wished to give to her son, the duke of Anjou (later Philippe, Duke of Orléans).

Between 1649 and 1651, Lorraine and the other younger sons of Harcourt and Cambout spent some time in the company of the young King Louis XIV and his brother, the duke of Anjou, although they likely did so with less frequency than did the count of Armagnac, who was one of the king's designated childhood companions.

In January 1649, during the Fronde des Parlements, the king and his court fled Paris, planning to lay siege to it. The count of Harcourt had not been informed, and therefore his family, including Lorraine, were left trapped in their residence, where they were functionally prisoners.

Lorraine was created a knight of Malta on 24 November 1649, at the age of six, at the same time as his two-year-old brother, Raymond-Bérenger de Lorraine. The count of Harcourt purchased positions in the Order of Malta for three of his sons at a price of 3,990 livres each. Such a position allowed his sons to hold ecclesiastical offices, while also affording them the opportunity to have a military command. It was around this time that Lorraine began to be referred to by the title of "chevalier de Lorraine."

At the age of seven, Lorraine was breeched, and received a governor and a preceptor. Lorraine's governor is unknown, but his preceptor was the king's almoner, Gilles Le Jouynel. Lorraine was educated in mathematics, French, Latin, Italian, history, geography, dance, and fencing. He was noted to have been a precocious child with regards to military practice, including equestrianism and hunting.

On the night of 12 January 1652, Lorraine and his brothers escaped the chaos in Paris during the Fronde des Princes to seek safety at the Abbey of Royaumont; however, their mother, Cambout, was arrested while attempting to leave.

=== Monsieur's favourite and sexuality ===
There is some debate as to when Lorraine became the lover of the duke of Orléans (known as Monsieur at court), with hypotheses ranging from 1658 to 1668. Based on the account of Daniel de Cosnac, Monsieur's confessor, Pieragnoli argues that the affair likely began sometime in the winter of 1666-1667. Barker generally concurs, placing the beginning of Monsieur's and Lorraine's relationship during the 1667-1668 War of Devolution.

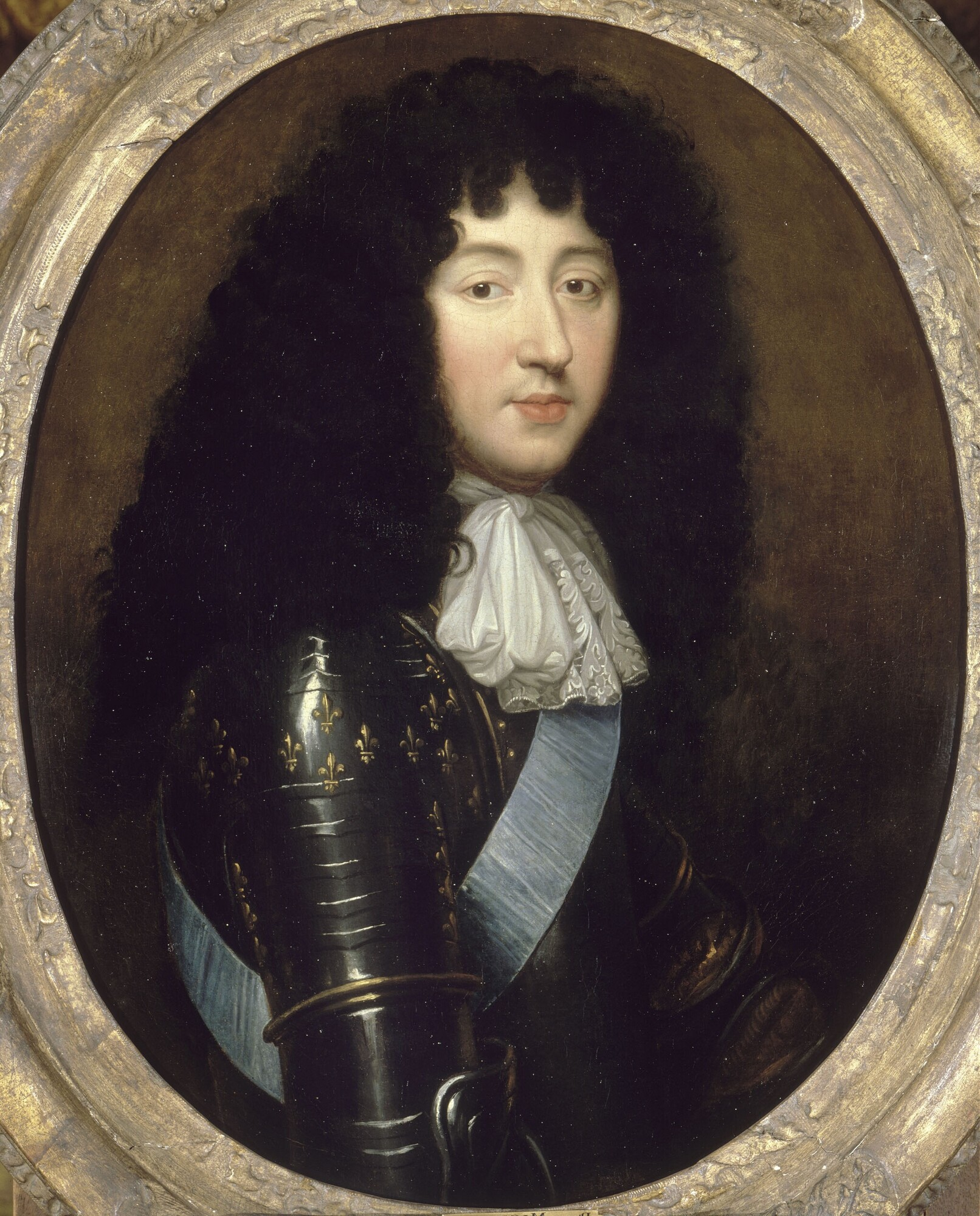
Portrait of Philippe de France, Duke of Orléans by an unknown artist, 1651-1675

During the War of Devolution, the duke requested that the chevalier and his Harcourt Regiment be placed under his command; after initially denying his brother's request, the king eventually approved it. On the night of 24-25 August 1667, Lorraine was wounded in the foot by a grenade during an assault at Lille; contemporaries noted that Monsieur had him moved to his own tent and that Monsieur passed entire days there. Following his return from the campaign in Flanders, Monsieur declared "that he had resolved to distinguish [Lorraine] from all others in the realm [and] to give him a place in his house." Upon arriving at the Château de Villers-Cotterêts, Cosnac records that Lorraine "was received by Monsieur with incredible joy. From that moment, [Monsieur's] favour had been declared." Monsieur and Lorraine were for days inseparable.

Lorraine remained Monsieur's maître en titre (official favourite) or favori déclaré (declared favourite) from the end of the 1660s to the end of the duke's life in 1701, in a "long-term partnership in a very modern sense." As such, Lorraine was entrusted with running the Orléans household. In this capacity he oversaw the duke's finances; ran the duke's residences at the Palais-Royal and the Château de Saint-Cloud; and exercised some influence over household appointments and dismissals. At times during their relationship, Lorraine and the duke lived in a ménage à trois with Antoine Coëffier de Ruzé, Marquis d'Effiat or Charles, Count of Beuvron.

Primi Visconti relates that beginning in the 1670s, Lorraine supplied young men to Monsieur's court, without removing himself as an option as a partner. He kept himself in favour by controlling who Monsieur would have affairs with, without putting himself "outside the ranks."

By the end of the 1670s, Monsieur seems to have considered Lorraine a spouse: on the occasion of her visit, Monsieur insisted that Sophie of Hanover kiss Lorraine, as she was expected to do only with members of the royal family.

The relationship between the Lorraine and the duke reportedly affected Monsieur's first marriage to Henriette Stuart. Saint-Simon indicates that the duke of Orléans declared he could not love his wife without Lorraine's approval, contributing to marital tensions.

Contemporary correspondence and later memoirists attest to the tension between Lorraine and Henriette, as well as to Philippe's limited discretion regarding his long-standing relationship with Lorraine.

According to Henriette, Elizabeth Charlotte, and Saint-Simon, Lorraine frequently manipulated the duke of Orléans. The duke of Orléans married Elizabeth Charlotte of the Palatinate in 1671. Historian Dirk Van der Cruysse later characterized Lorraine as follows:

Philippe de Lorraine was three years younger than Philippe d'Orléans. Insinuating, brutal and devoid of scruple, he was the great love of Monsieur's life. He was also the worst enemy of the latter's two wives. As greedy as a vulture, this younger son of the French branch of the House of Lorraine had, by the end of the 1650s, hooked Monsieur like a harpooned whale. The young prince loved him with a passion that worried Madame Henriette and the court bishop, Cosnac, but it was plain to the King that, thanks to the attractive face and sharp mind of the good-looking chevalier, he would have his way with his brother.

Lorraine's relationship with the second Madame was complex; although she did not fault Monsieur or his favourites for their homosexual relationships, she complained of Monsieur's tendency to overspend on his favourites and of Lorraine's "poisoning [Monsieur's] soul" against her. They had reconciled by the end of the 1690s.

Lorraine was likely bisexual, having had recorded relationships with several people of both genders (many of which occurred during his relationship with Monsieur), including Elizabeth de Fiennes, Louise-Elizabeth de Rouxel, Madame de Grancey (it was rumoured that Lorraine had sons with both Fiennes and Grancey), Monsieur, Effiat, and possibly Armand de Gramont, Comte de Guiche.

=== Imprisonment and first exile ===
On 31 January 1670, the king's guard surrounded Monsieur's apartments at the Château de Saint-Germain and arrested the chevalier de Lorraine. Louis XIV may have ordered the arrest for a variety of reasons, including Lorraine's role in forming a rift between the king and Monsieur by informing Monsieur of his exclusion from negotiations of the Secret Treaty of Dover; "as a result of Monsieur’s overreaching demands for ecclesiastic benefices for his favourite"; and to appease repeated demands for Lorraine's removal from Madame's brother, King Charles II of England, and his ministers, who threatened that to do otherwise "could very well change the whole fact of the affairs under negotiation [the Secret Treaty of Dover]." Lorraine was imprisoned first in the Château de Pierre Scize, near Lyon, and then at the island fortress of the Château d'If, offshore from Marseille.

In protest of Lorraine's imprisonment, Monsieur removed himself to the Château de Villers-Cotterêts and forced Madame to Saint-Germain. Henriette's absence from court prevented her from fulfilling her role as go-between for the signing of the Secret Treaty of Dover, forcing King Louis to negotiate with his brother for his permission for Madame to return.

In February 1670, Louis agreed to mitigate the severity of the punishment, and on 24 February, Monsieur returned to court. The king initially proposed sending Lorraine to fight the Barbary pirates in fulfillment of his military obligation to the Order of Malta (he had not yet completed the military service to the Order necessary to become a full member, and likely never did); however, Lorraine's brother, the count of Armagnac, interceded, using his favour with the king to convince him to send Lorraine into exile in Rome instead. Lorraine was provided with a pension of 10,000 écus, and was exiled together with his brother, Charles, Count of Marsan, who had defended him.

Lorraine stayed until April in Marseille, and arrived in Genoa on 15 April. Marsan had left the French court a few days earlier; they arrived together in Rome at the beginning of May 1670.

Lorraine and Marsan were allowed to return to the French court in 1672, possibly because the king viewed Lorraine as a means by which to control the duke of Orléans, or because Louis was planning another war with the Dutch Republic (this would become the Franco-Dutch War), and viewed Lorraine's proven military capabilities as an asset for his war effort.

=== Accused of poisoning ===
On 30 June 1670, Henriette died suddenly and mysteriously at Saint-Cloud, convinced that she had been poisoned. Although Monsieur was initially suspected, his genuine grief over her passing exonerated him in the eyes of most, and blame for the poisoning fell on Lorraine, the marquis of Effiat, and the count of Beuvron or Antoine Morel de Volonne.

For the king, the accusations that Madame had been poisoned threatened the reputation of his family, his court, and his relations with England. He and Monsieur demanded an open autopsy, which was conducted by the best physicians and surgeons in France, and presided over by French and English diplomats and an English surgeon. The autopsy concluded that Henriette had died of natural causes, having found that several of her vital organs were decomposing, including her stomach, intestines, and liver; her abdominal cavity had advanced gangrene; and she had a punctured lung. In addition, the autopsy found that Madame had been suffering from pulmonary tuberculosis when she died. She had been in poor health for several weeks before collapsing at Saint-Cloud, having been unable to eat anything but milk when she departed for England three weeks prior, and having been complaining for days of "pains in her side and stomach."

Today, experts believe that the first Madame probably died of peritonitis caused by a ruptured ulcer. Historians Nancy Nichols Barker, Elizabeth Lurgo, and Joan Pieragnoli maintain that she was not poisoned.

Despite significant evidence against poisoning, rumours persisted that Lorraine and Effiat had poisoned Henriette. These rumours were taken up between 68 and 78 years later by Louis de Rouvroy, duc de Saint-Simon in his Mémoires, in which he claimed that with the intention of killing the duchess, while exiled in Italy,

the Chevalier de Lorraine sent a sure and rapid poison to his two friends [Effiat and Beuvron] by a messenger who did not probably know what he carried.

Monsieur's second wife, Elizabeth Charlotte of the Palatinate, also believed that Lorraine had poisoned the first Madame, this time with the help of Effiat and Antoine Morel de Volonne. She wrote of the incident that Henriette:

was not capable of forgiving, and was determined to drive away the Chevalier de Lorraine. In that she succeeded, but it cost her her life. He sent the poison from Italy by a Provençal gentleman named Morel, and to reward the latter he was made chief maître-d’hôtel.

=== Scandal of 1682 and second exile ===
In June of 1682, a scandal broke at court: there was revealed to be a group of young men who "pushed their debauchery to horrible excesses," turning the court into "a little Sodom." Only increasing the scale of the scandal was the publication that same summer of the pamphlet La France devenue italienne ("France become Italian"), titled in reference to the "Italian vice," a contemporary term for homosexuality. The pamphlet described a homosexual confraternity of young men at court who had renounced the company of women; historian Joan Pieragnoli, however, argues that such a confraternity never existed, and historian Jonathan Spangler is skeptical. The scandal resulted in the removal of a number of prominent noblemen from court, including Lorraine.

The investigation into the group conducted on behalf of the king by Louis I de Bouchet, Marquis de Sourches does not list Lorraine as one of the men involved; however, by the end of June, Lorraine was exiled to Villers-Cotterêts "for the same reasons that the other young men have been banished from Court." Lorraine's nephew, Henri, Count of Brionne, and his younger brother, the count of Marsan, had both been named in Sourches' initial investigation; however, Lorraine was the only one of the three be exiled.

Two of Louis XIV's sons had been implicated in the scandal. One was the 14-year-old Louis, Count of Vermandois, legitimized son of Louis XIV and Louise de La Vallière, who accused Lorraine of seducing him and inducing him to begin practicing homosexuality. The second Madame, Elizabeth Charlotte, remained convinced her entire life that Lorraine was guilty of debauching Vermandois.

Pieragnoli, however, argues that Lorraine may not have been involved with Vermandois. Aside from Lorraine's indignation at having been accused, it was not in his interest to pursue Vermandois, the seduction of whom would put Lorraine into conflict with the king. Additionally, Lorraine and Vermandois had reason to dislike each other: Lorraine had an ongoing feud with the House of Conti, which Vermandois supported; and just before the first waves of the scandal broke, on 25 June, Lorraine had been forced by the king to sell his hôtel particulier (private mansion) at Versailles to Vermandois.

Although Lorraine was allowed a brief stay at court in November, it was not until May of 1683 that the king officially permitted him to return, provided that he remain in the company of the duke of Orléans.

=== Final decade ===
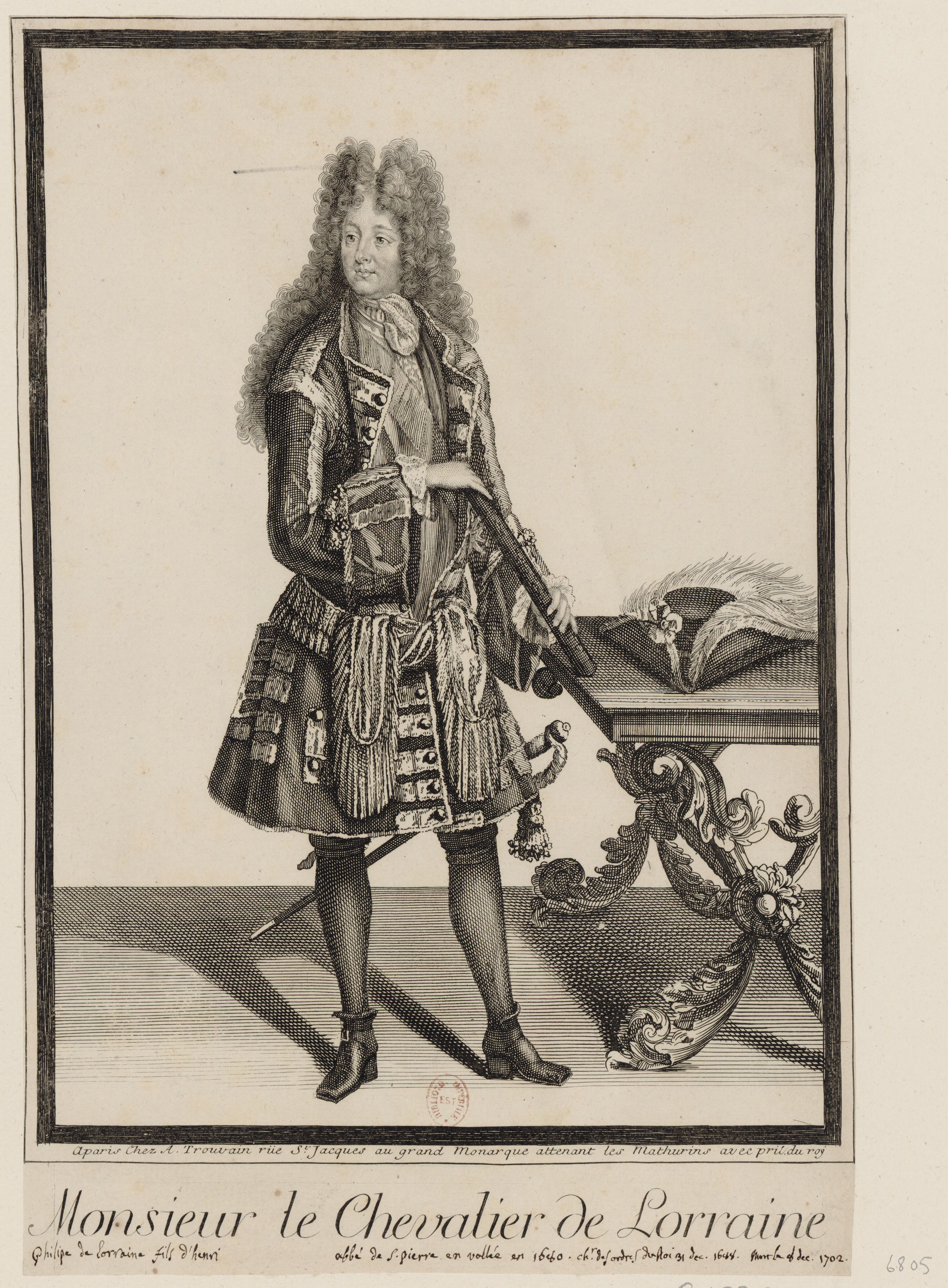
The Chevalier de Lorraine in 1702

Lorraine was blamed for helping to arrange the 1692 marriage between Monsieur's only surviving son, the duke of Chartres, and his first cousin, Mademoiselle de Blois, who was the legitimized daughter of Louis XIV and Madame de Montespan. Lorraine's creation as knight of the Order of the Holy Spirit in 1688 was rumoured to be a bribe from the king to secure his support of the match, which was necessary as Lorraine was the "dominant force" in the household of the duke of Orléans.

By 1701, near the end of his life, Philippe de Lorraine had lost much of the furniture in his apartment at the Palais-Royal and in his country residence at the Château de Frémont (filled with remains from the Palatinate), his four abbeys, and all of the money he had obtained (more or less with permission) from the coffers of the State, by gambling and exploitation of his lovers; however, he did manage to reconcile with Elizabeth Charlotte.

Following the death of Monsieur on 9 June 1701, his son, Philippe II, Duke of Orléans, offered Lorraine a pension of 10,000 écus and the retention of his apartments at the Palais-Royal. Lorraine refused the pension, but accepted the apartments. Biographer Joan Pieragnoli argues that Lorraine began putting his affairs in order in July of 1701, just four weeks after the death of the duke of Orléans.

Saint-Simon reported rumors that Lorraine married in secret his cousin Béatrice Hiéronyme de Lorraine (1662–1738), Abbess of Remiremont. Historian Jonathan Spangler argues that this claim can "probably" be disregarded.

=== Death ===
Saint-Simon records that Lorraine collapsed suddenly on 7 December, 1702, and died shortly thereafter, noting that there was no evidence of prolonged illness. This claim is disputed by the contemporary accounts of Louis I de Bouchet, Marquis de Sourches and Philippe de Courcillon, Marquis de Dangeau, who both record that Lorraine had suffered an attack of apoplexy (a contemporary term for a stroke-like illness) three months prior to his death, in September of 1702, which left him with half of his body paralyzed and difficulty speaking.

Philippe de Lorraine died in the Palais-Royal after midnight on 8 December 1702, aged 59, after suffering an attack of apoplexy in the afternoon of 7 December.

=== Titles, properties, and honours ===
==== Titles ====
As a Lorraine-Guise, Lorraine held the rank of prince étranger, and was therefore entitled to be referred to as "Son Altesse" ("His Highness").

==== Properties ====
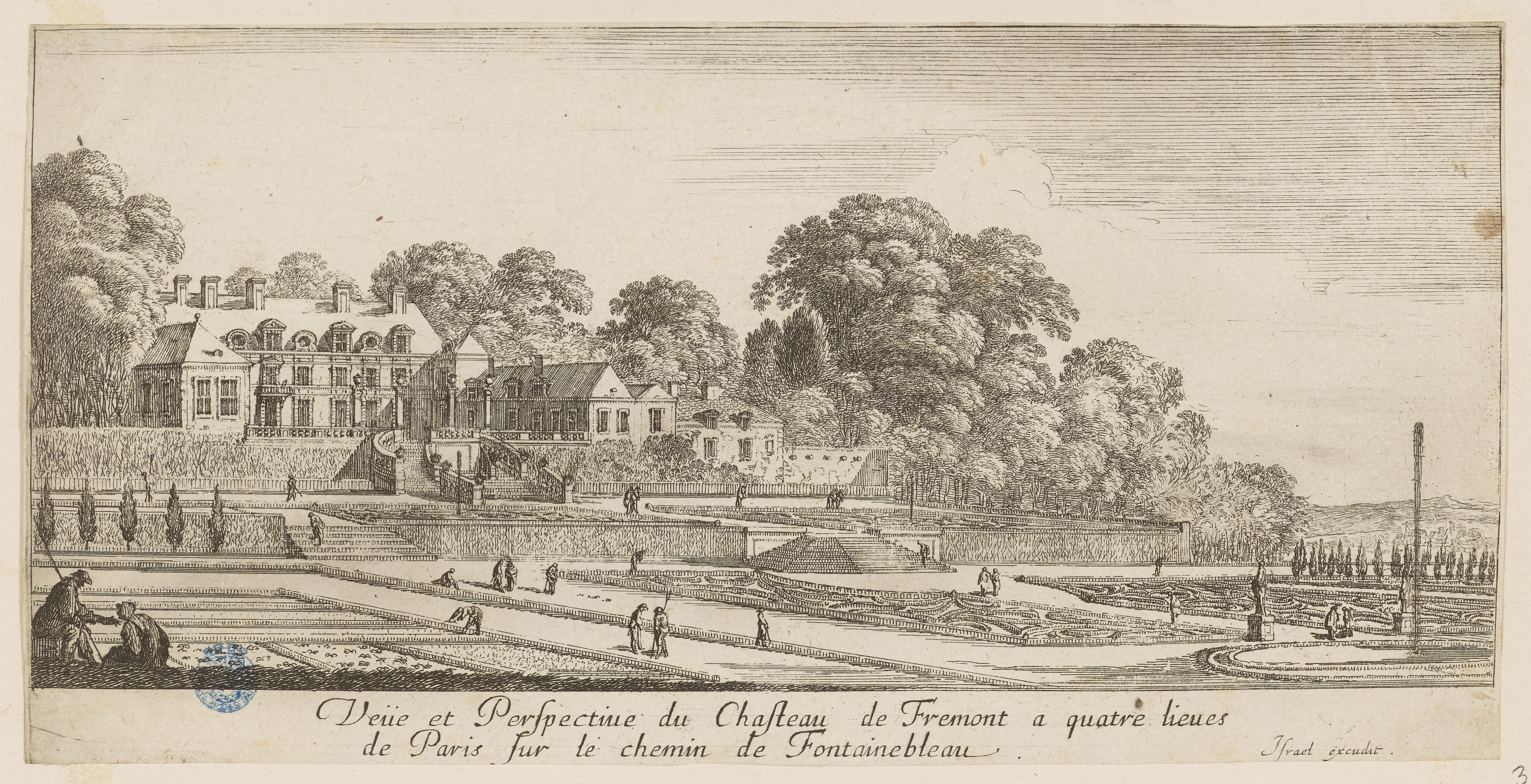
View of the Château de Frémont in the seventeenth century

Between 1674 and 1680, Lorraine became the titular abbot of four wealthy abbeys: the Sainte-Trinité de Tiron in 1674; Saint-Jean-des-Vignes, near Soissons, in 1678; Fleury in 1679; and Saint-Père-en-Vallée in the Diocese of Chartres in 1680. Each of these abbeys were "heads of much larger monastic networks," and likely provided an income of tens of thousands of livres annually; Boislisle places the figure around 70,000 for all four. In the 1680s, at Fleury Abbey, Lorraine "rebuilt the abbot's residence on a grand scale."

In September 1672, the duke of Orléans helped Lorraine purchase the hôtel particulier built by Bernardin Gigault de Bellefonds in a favourable position on the grounds of Versailles, which Lorraine owned until the king forced him to sell it to the count of Vermandois in 1682.

In 1687, Lorraine acquired the Château de Frémont, located on the royal route between Paris and the king's hunting retreat at the Palace of Fontainebleau, and commissioned the current neoclassical design of the building. Dangeau cites at least 17 royal visits (by the king, Monsieur, or the Grand Dauphin) to the château during Lorraine's tenure as owner. He maintained rooms at his château for both Monsieur and Madame.

Lorraine maintained apartments in Monsieur's residences at the Palais-Royal and the Château de Saint-Cloud. He also held apartments in Versailles proper on the ground floor of the Aile des Princes (Aile du Midi), which was "otherwise reserved for princes of the blood and senior courtiers"; Lorraine's apartments were located beside those that belonged successively to royal favourites Jean-Baptiste Colbert, François-Michel le Tellier, Marquis de Louvois, and Michel Chamillart.

==== Honours ====
In 1679, on the occasion of the marriage of the duke of Orléans's eldest daughter, Marie Louise d'Orléans, to King Charles II of Spain, Lorraine was chosen to be a part of the retinue that accompanied the new queen to Amboise, as far as the duke did (that is, farther than King Louis XIV, Queen Maria Theresa, or Madame went).

The chevalier de Lorraine was created a knight of the Order of the Holy Spirit, the most prestigious military knighthood of the ancien régime, on 31 December 1688 at Versailles. Two of his brothers, Louis, Count of Armagnac and Charles, Count of Marsan, were also created members of the order on the same day. Lorraine and his brothers were recommended for promotion not by Monsieur, but by the king, indicating significant royal favour for the family as a whole.

== Issue ==
An official record of a son's legitimation confirms that Lorraine had at least one illegitimate child by one of his mistresses; however, contemporary sources record two sons: one by Mademoiselle de Fiennes, born between 1668 and 1672, and one by Madame de Grancey.

Madame de Sévigné identifies an illegitimate son of Lorraine and Mademoiselle de Fiennes being raised by Catherine de Neufville, the wife of Lorraine's brother, the count of Armagnac.

Lorraine secured legitimization for only one son in March 1674, allowing him to inherit property. This was:

- Alexandre or Alexis, Chevalier de Beauvernois (dates unknown, active after 1690), known as le bâtard de Lorraine ("Lorraine's bastard"), who took his title from the seigneurie of Beauvernois, which he inherited from his father. He defected from the French army in 1690 and moved to the court of Hanover, where he married.

== Portrayals in fiction ==
Philippe de Lorraine has been portrayed in:

- The Vicomte of Bragelonne: Ten Years Later (serialized 1847–1850) by Alexandre Dumas
- The Private Life of Louis XIV (1935 film), played by Aribert Wäscher
- Angélique, the Marquise of the Angels (1956 novel) by Anne Golon and Serge Golon
- Angélique, Marquise des Anges (1964 film), played by Robert Hoffmann
- Marvelous Angelique (1965 film), played by Robert Hoffmann
- Liselotte of the Palatinate (1966 film), played by Robert Dietl
- Versailles (2015 TV series), played by Evan Williams

== See also ==
- Philippe I, Duke of Orléans
- Henrietta of England
- Elizabeth Charlotte, Madame Palatine
- Antoine II Coëffier de Ruzé
- Louis, Count of Armagnac
- Charles, Count of Marsan
- Madame de Grancey
- List of knights of the Order of the Holy Spirit
