= Ris-Orangis =

Commune in Île-de-France, France

- Commune
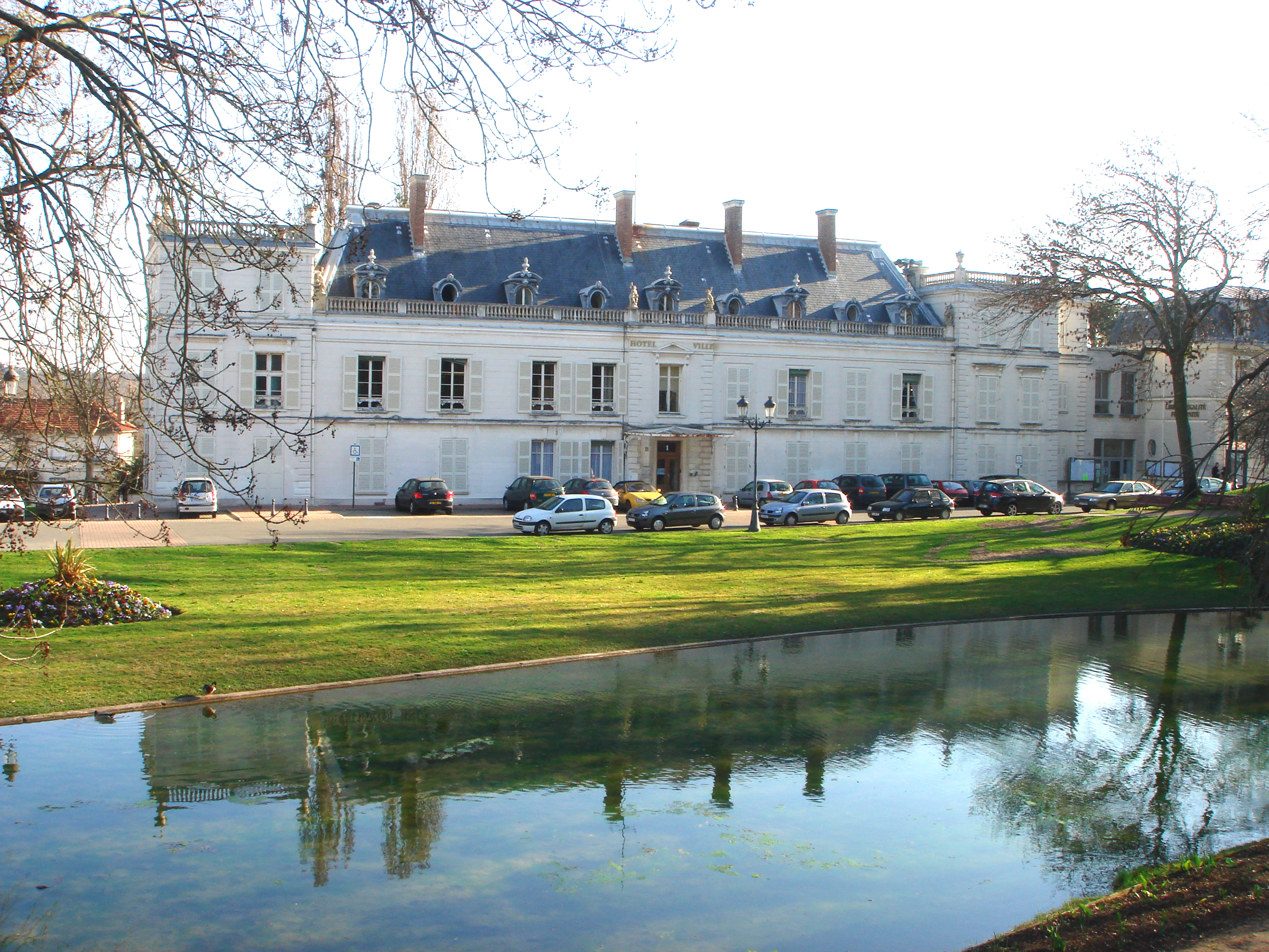
- The Hôtel de Ville

- Coat of arms

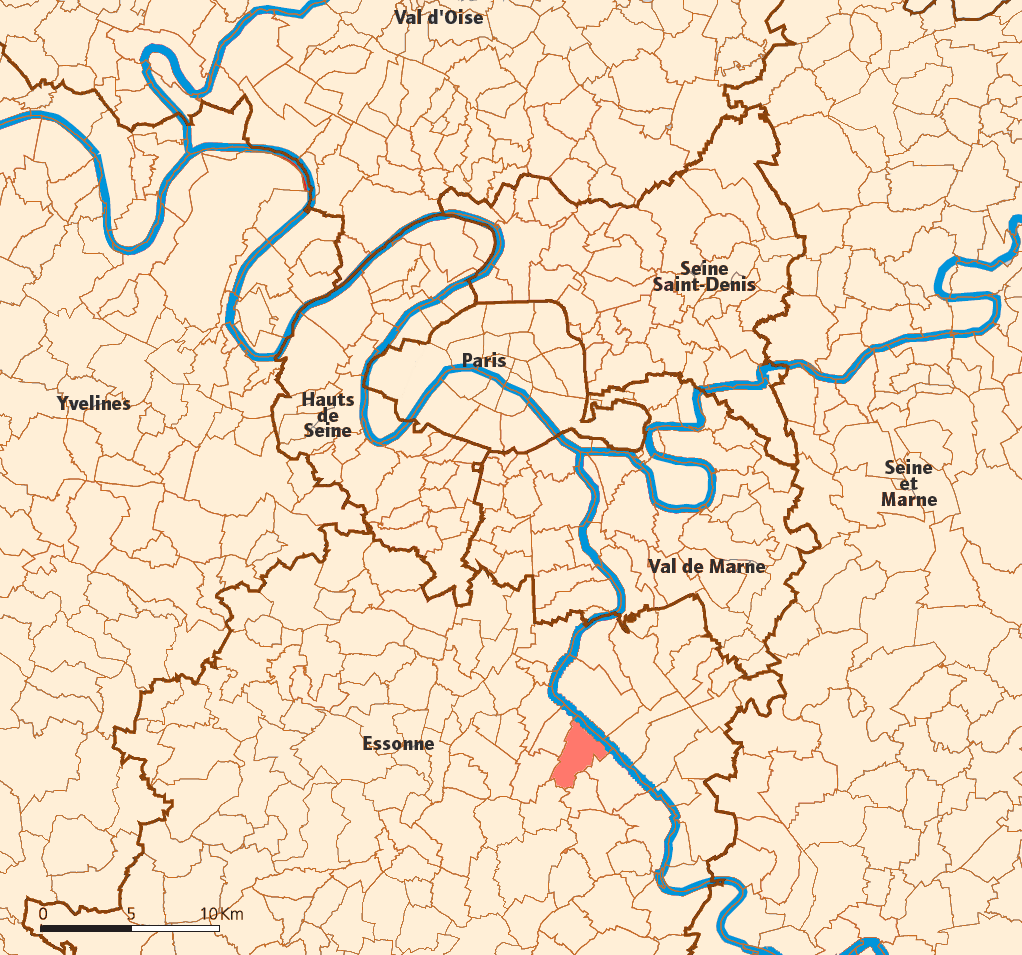
- Location (in red) within Paris inner and outer suburbs
- Location of Ris-Orangis
- Location within France Location within Île-de-France (region)
- Coordinates: 48°39′13″N 2°24′58″E
- Country: France
- Region: Île-de-France
- Department: Essonne
- Arrondissement: Évry
- Canton: Ris-Orangis
- Intercommunality: CA Grand Paris Sud Seine-Essonne-Sénart

Government
  - Mayor (2026–32): Sonia Benameur
- Area^{1}: 8.71 km^{2} (3.36 sq mi)
- Highest elevation: 82 m (269 ft)
- Lowest elevation: 32 m (105 ft)
- Population (2023): 31,189
  - Density: 3,580/km^{2} (9,270/sq mi)
- Time zone: UTC+01:00 (CET)
  - Summer (DST): UTC+02:00 (CEST)
- INSEE/Postal code: 91521 /91130
- ^{1} French Land Register data, which excludes lakes, ponds, glaciers > 1 km^{2} (0.386 sq mi or 247 acres) and river estuaries.

Ris-Orangis (French pronunciation: [ʁis ɔʁɑ̃ʒis]) is a commune in the southern suburbs of Paris, France. It is located 22.6 km (14.0 mi) from the center of Paris.

== History ==
The Hôtel de Ville, located in Ris, was commissioned as the Château de Fromont and completed in about 1700. The commune of Ris-Orangis was created in 1793 by the merger of the commune of Ris with the commune of Orangis.

== Population ==
Inhabitants of Ris-Orangis are known as Rissois in French.

Historical population

| Year | Pop. | ±% p.a. |
|---|---|---|
| 1793 | 553 | — |
| 1800 | 494 | −1.60% |
| 1806 | 516 | +0.73% |
| 1821 | 623 | +1.26% |
| 1831 | 590 | −0.54% |
| 1836 | 675 | +2.73% |
| 1841 | 758 | +2.35% |
| 1846 | 810 | +1.34% |
| 1851 | 864 | +1.30% |
| 1856 | 944 | +1.79% |
| 1861 | 1,101 | +3.12% |
| 1866 | 1,043 | −1.08% |
| 1872 | 990 | −0.87% |
| 1876 | 1,021 | +0.77% |
| 1881 | 1,179 | +2.92% |
| 1886 | 1,275 | +1.58% |
| 1891 | 1,412 | +2.06% |
| 1896 | 1,433 | +0.30% |
| 1901 | 1,495 | +0.85% |

| Year | Pop. | ±% p.a. |
|---|---|---|
| 1906 | 1,439 | −0.76% |
| 1911 | 1,552 | +1.52% |
| 1921 | 1,900 | +2.04% |
| 1926 | 2,322 | +4.09% |
| 1931 | 3,379 | +7.79% |
| 1936 | 3,783 | +2.28% |
| 1946 | 4,014 | +0.59% |
| 1954 | 5,576 | +4.19% |
| 1962 | 9,027 | +6.21% |
| 1968 | 23,511 | +17.30% |
| 1975 | 27,249 | +2.13% |
| 1982 | 24,925 | −1.27% |
| 1990 | 24,677 | −0.12% |
| 1999 | 24,436 | −0.11% |
| 2007 | 26,691 | +1.11% |
| 2012 | 26,800 | +0.08% |
| 2017 | 29,225 | +1.75% |
| 2023 | 31,189 | +1.09% |

Source: EHESS and INSEE (1968-2023)

== Education ==
As of 2015 3,712 students attend municipal schools of Ris-Orangis. They are:

- Seven preschools (écoles maternelles): des Fauvettes, de la Ferme du Temple, Adrien Guerton, Moulin à Vent, Michel Ordener, Pablo Picasso, and Jacques Derrida.
- Six elementary schools: Jules Boulesteix, de la Ferme du Temple, Adrien Guerton, Moulin à Vent, Orangis, Michel Ordener

Junior high schools include:

- Collège Albert Camus
- Collège Jean Lurçat

There is one senior high school, Lycée Pierre Mendès France.

== Personalities ==
- Chris Gadi, footballer for the France national U18 Team
- Sébastien Haller, footballer for the Ivory Coast National Football Team
- Jacques Derrida, philosopher
- Lloyd Cole, Musician who played infamous gig at the illustrious Le Plan venue
- Rory Gallagher, Musician who performed his final concert in France at the Le Plan rock club, after his death a street close to the venue was renamed in his honour to: Rue Rory Gallagher
- Sarah Michel, Basketballer for the women's national team

== Transport ==
Ris-Orangis is served by three stations on Paris RER line D: Ris-Orangis, Grand-Bourg, and Orangis – Bois de l'Épine.

== See also ==
- Communes of the Essonne department
