= Madame de Grancey =

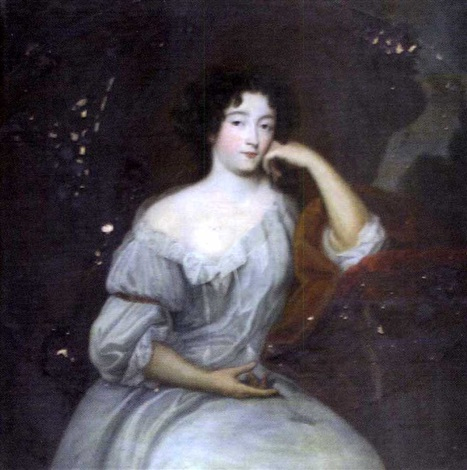
Portrait of Madame de Grancay by the workshop of Pierre Mignard

Louise-Elisabeth de Rouxel (1653 – 26 November 1711), known as Mademoiselle de Grancey and Madame de Grancey, was a French courtier. Madame de Grancey was the influential personal friend of Philippe I, Duke of Orléans and the mistress of his favorite Philippe, Chevalier de Lorraine. She is also known for a plot to replace Madame de Montespan as the mistress of Louis XIV.

== Life and career ==
Louise-Elisabeth de Rouxel was born to Jacques de Rouxel, comte de Grancey et de Médavy, maréchal de France (1603–1680) and Charlotte de Mornay-Villarceaux (1620–1694).

In 1669, she was the central figure of a plot to replace Madame de Montespan as the mistress of king Louis XIV. This plot ultimately failed.

She was a personal friend and confidant of Philippe I, Duke of Orléans, and her influence over him was such that she was said to have ruled his household in the Château de Saint-Cloud. There was for a time a rumour that she was the mistress of the Duke of Orléans, but this is not believed to have been true. Indeed, the Duke was rumoured to be homosexual. She did, however, have a relationship with Philippe, Chevalier de Lorraine, the acknowledged favorite of the Duke of Orléans.

In 1679, the Duke of Orléans successfully asked his brother the king to give her a formal office in the household of his daughter Marie Louise d'Orléans, and she was appointed Dame d'atour. As such, she was given an official rank at court and afforded the honorary title Madame, despite her unmarried status, and was thereafter known as Madame de Grancey. She accompanied Marie Louise on her wedding to the King of Spain in 1680.

== Legacy ==
Louise-Elisabeth de Rouxel was frequently mentioned in the memoirs of Elizabeth Charlotte, Madame Palatine, as well as in other contemporary memoirs.
