= Effiat =

- Commune
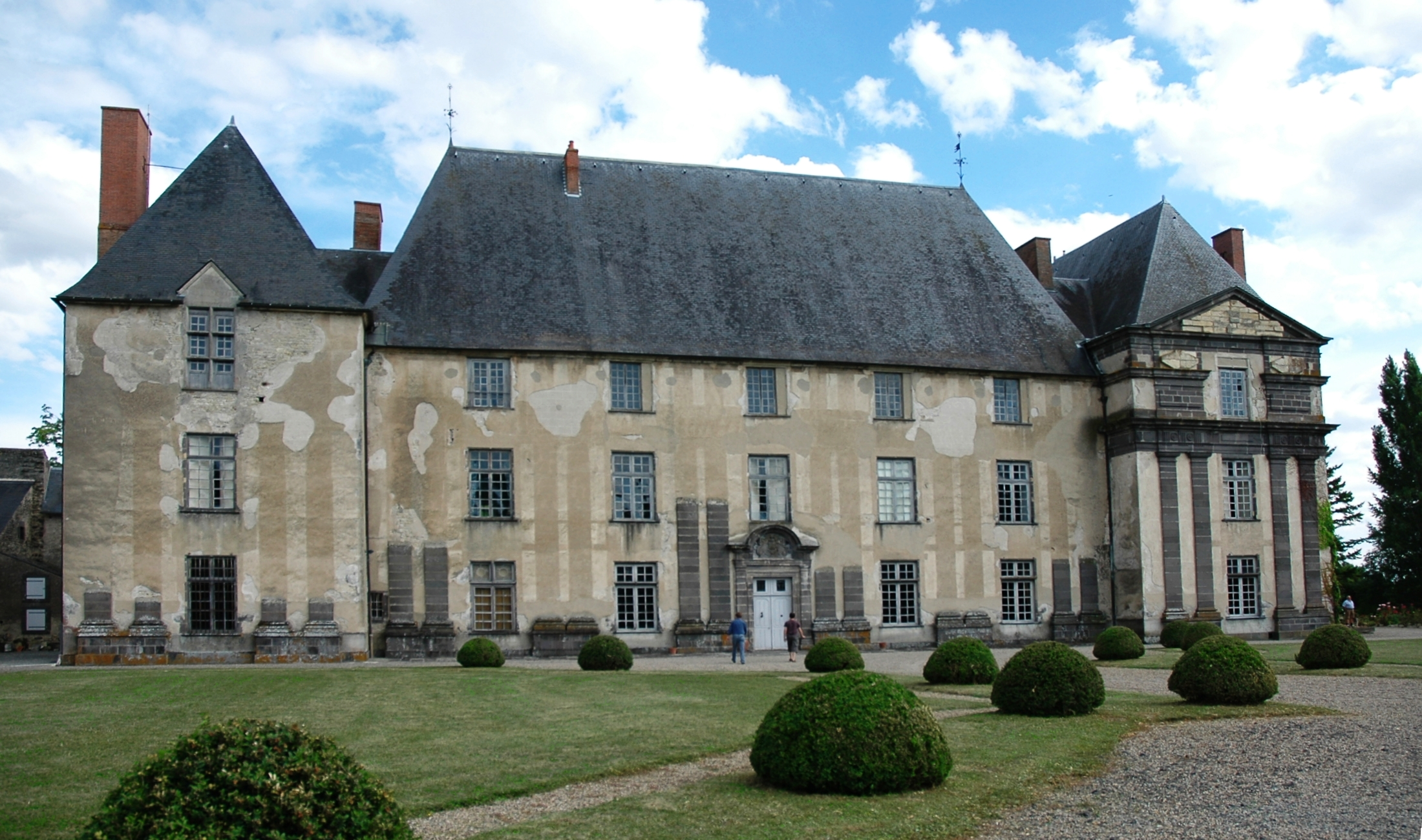
- The chateau in Effiat
- Location of Effiat
- Location within France Location within Auvergne-Rhône-Alpes
- Coordinates: 46°02′27″N 3°15′23″E
- Country: France
- Region: Auvergne-Rhône-Alpes
- Department: Puy-de-Dôme
- Arrondissement: Riom
- Canton: Aigueperse
- Intercommunality: CC Plaine Limagne

Government
  - Mayor (2026–32): Marc Carrias
- Area^{1}: 19.96 km^{2} (7.71 sq mi)
- Elevation: 355 m (1,165 ft)
- Highest elevation: 437 m (1,434 ft)
- Lowest elevation: 317 m (1,040 ft)
- Population (2023): 1,124
  - Density: 56.31/km^{2} (145.8/sq mi)
- Demonym: Effiatois
- Time zone: UTC+01:00 (CET)
  - Summer (DST): UTC+02:00 (CEST)
- INSEE/Postal code: 63143 /63260
- Website: effiat.fr
- ^{1} French Land Register data, which excludes lakes, ponds, glaciers > 1 km^{2} (0.386 sq mi or 247 acres) and river estuaries.

Effiat (French pronunciation: [ɛfja]) is a commune in the Puy-de-Dôme department in Auvergne-Rhône-Alpes in central France.

Its inhabitants are called Effiatois.

== See also ==
- Communes of the Puy-de-Dôme department
