= Minister of the Interior (France) =

Government ministry of France

- Ministre de l'Intérieur

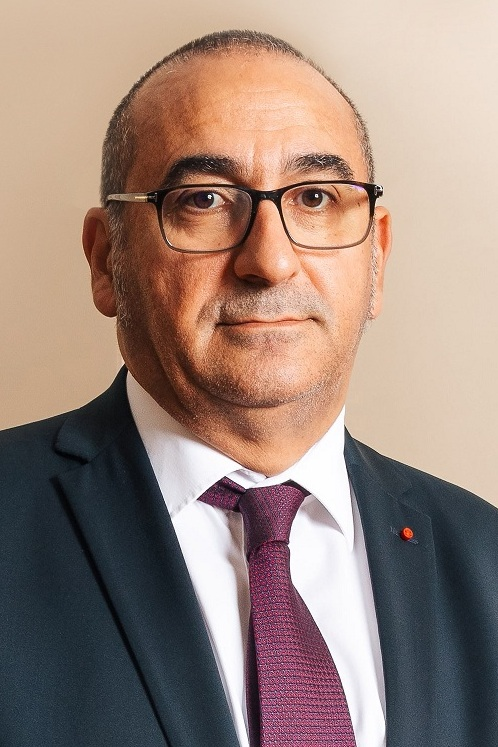
- Incumbent; Laurent Nuñez since 12 October 2025
- Style: Monsieur le ministre
- Member of: Council of Ministers
- Reports to: President of the Republic and to Parliament
- Residence: Hôtel de Beauvau
- Seat: Paris 8^{e}, France
- Appointer: President of the Republic
- Term length: No fixed term; Remains in office while commanding the confidence of the National Assembly and the President of the Republic
- Precursor: Minister for the Maison du Roi
- Formation: 7 August 1790
- First holder: François-Emmanuel Guignard, comte de Saint-Priest
- Website: www.interieur.gouv.fr

The Minister of the Interior (French: Ministre de l'Intérieur, pronounced [ministʁ d(ə) lɛ̃teʁjœʁ]) is the interior minister of the government of France, traditionally responsible for internal security and territorial administration. The minister ensures the maintenance and cohesion of the country's institutions throughout its national territory.

The current Minister of the Interior is Laurent Nuñez, who has held the position since 12 October 2025 under Prime Minister Sébastien Lecornu.

== Responsibilities ==
The Minister of the Interior is responsible for the following:

- The general interior security of the country, with respect to criminal acts or natural catastrophes
  - including the major law-enforcement forces
    - the National Police
    - the National Gendarmerie for its police operations since 2009; as a part of the French Armed Forces, the Gendarmerie is administratively under the purview of the Ministry of Armed Forces
  - General directorate for civil defence and crisis management (Sécurité Civile)
    - the directorate of Firefighters (Sapeurs-Pompiers)
- the granting of identity documents (passports, identity cards) and driving licenses through the network of prefectures and subprefectures
- relations between the central government and local governments
- logistics and organisation of political elections, at the national and prefectoral levels; the results of the elections are overseen by the Constitutional Council or the administrative courts
- regulation of immigration and preventing illegal immigration
- integration of legal immigrants (professionally, linguistically, housing)
- all regional and departmental prefects and subprefects are subordinate to the Minister of the Interior

The Minister of the Interior also takes on the role of the former Minister of Worship and is formally consulted in the process of appointment of Catholic diocesan bishops (Briand-Ceretti Agreement). The Minister of Worship used to be a fully-fledged position; the office was abolished in 1912.

While the Ministry of the Interior supervises police forces, it does not supervise criminal enquiries. Those enquiries are conducted under the supervision of the judiciary.

== History ==
The Minister for the Maison du Roi under the Ancien Régime is considered to be the precursor of the position of Minister of the Interior, which was officially established on 7 August 1790, during the French Revolution, when François-Emmanuel Guignard, comte de Saint-Priest became the inaugural officeholder. Although his tasks included the organisation of elections, relations with local authorities, agriculture, as well as trade, the Minister of the Interior's main duty was to oversee the functioning of police forces. This has been the case since then, with the exception of the period from 1796 to 1818, when a Ministry of Police was in use, which was also briefly restored under the Second Empire.

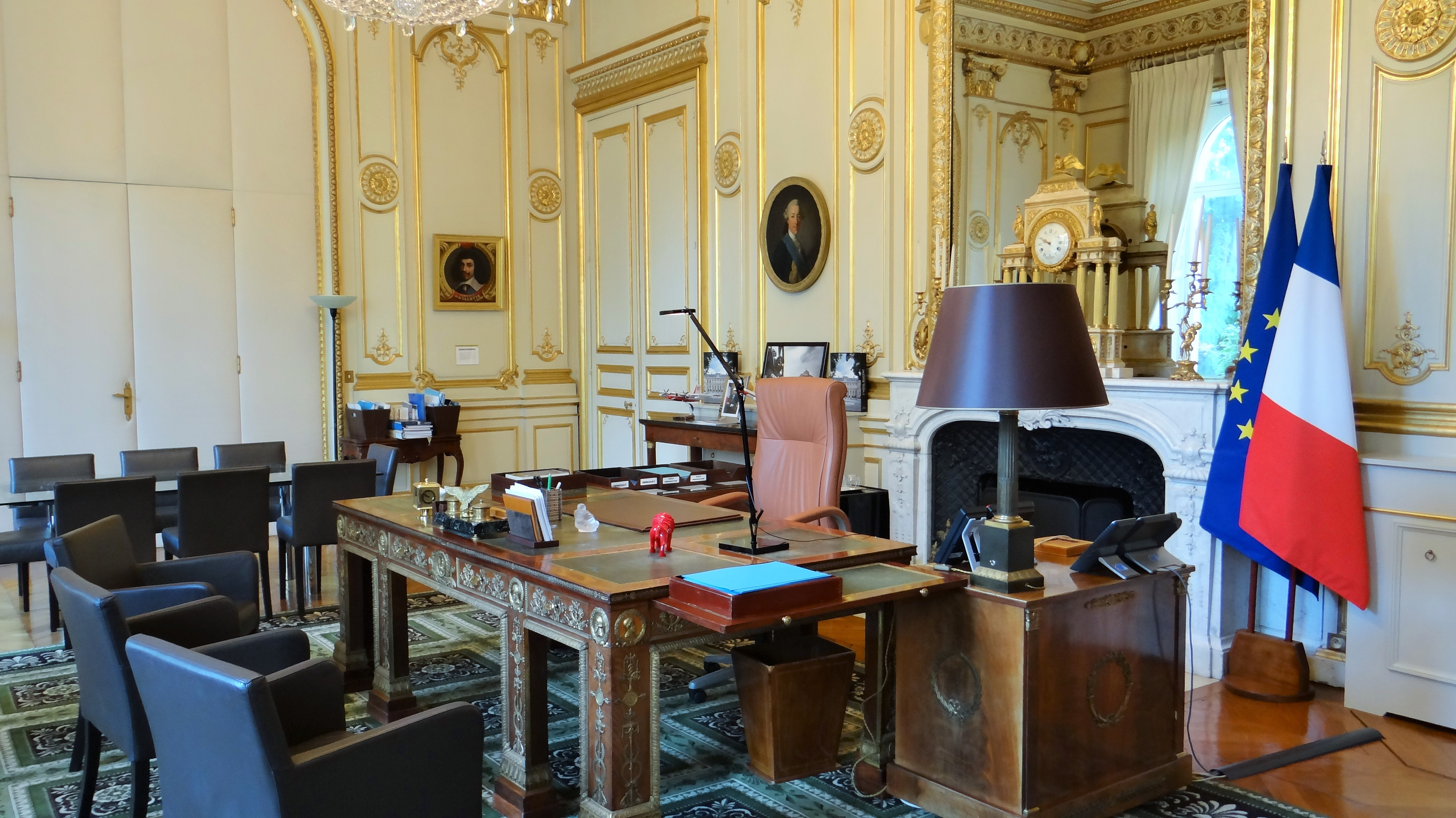
Office of the Minister of the Interior

During the First Empire, the Interior Ministry's tasks were reduced; in 1824, the Ministry of Public Instruction was established to oversee France's education policy. In 1832, the Interior Ministry was primarily occupied with the holding of elections and maintenance of the firefighters force, as the Institut de France and national public libraries were transferred to the Public Instruction Ministry. In 1836, the Ministry of Public Works, Agriculture and Commerce was established.

In 1911, the Directorate of Penitentiary Administration, established in 1858 in the Interior Ministry to oversee prison conditions, was placed under the authority of the Minister of Justice. Nine years later, the Interior Ministry lost its public health policy department to the newly established Ministry of Hygiene, Assistance and Social Security.

== Location ==
The ministry's headquarters have been located on Place Beauvau, facing the Élysée Palace, since 1861. "Place Beauvau" is often used as a metonym for the ministry.

== Organisation ==
The Minister of the Interior has been Laurent Nuñez since 12 October 2025. He succeeded Bruno Retailleau, who was appointed to the office on 21 September 2024. Nuñez is assisted by Marie-Pierre Vedrenne, who holds the title of Minister-Delegate in the government of Prime Minister Sébastien Lecornu.

== See also ==
- List of Interior Ministers of France
