= Arenc affair =

Affair on the police abduction of Mohamed Chérif

Arenc detention center
- Centre de rétention d'Arenc
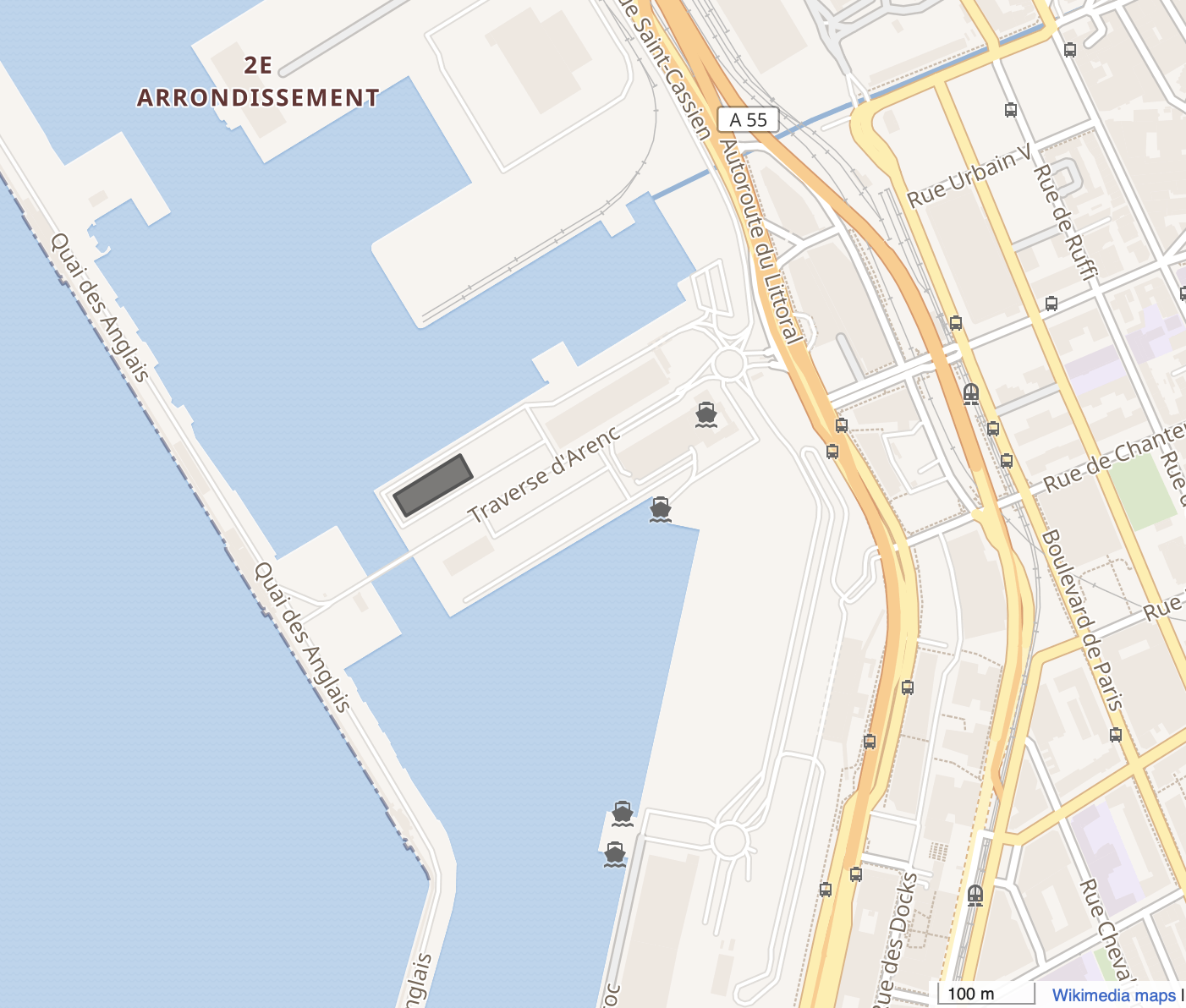
- Warehouse location

- Location within France

General information
- Type: Administrative detention center
- Location: Provence-Alpes-Côte d'Azur region, Bouches-du-Rhône department., Marseille, France
- Coordinates: 43°18′44″N 5°21′40″E
- Inaugurated: 1963
- Closed: 2006

Other information
- Number of rooms: 80

The Arenc affair began on April 16, 1975 in Marseille, France, when attorney Sixte Ugolini publicly condemned the police's kidnapping of his client, Mohamed Chérif, a Moroccan citizen with legal status. Shortly thereafter, the general public discovered a dormant warehouse located in the port of Arenc that had been covertly used by the prefecture for more than a decade to detain non-nationals (primarily Algerians) awaiting deportation, outside of any established legal framework. The affair foreshadowed the establishment of administrative detention centers, which were brought into law in October 1981.

== Background ==
=== Attempt to curtail immigration of Algerians ===
By the end of 1962, the French police aimed to restrict Algerian migration to Marseille to prevent a surge of "unemployed, sick, homeless, and socially undesirable masses." Starting April 1963, France circumvented the "free movement" arrangement under the Évian Accords by introducing "health checks" (essentially fitness-for-work assessments), leading to approximately 13% of Algerians being denied entry. While waiting to reboard the ship, individuals denied entry were housed overnight, initially in a hostel located behind the port and later from September 1963 in a 600 m^{2} facility within the port of Arenc. The facility occupied the second floor of a previously decommissioned warehouse, accessible by only an external metal staircase. This area had previously been used since May 1962 to receive and distribute repatriated Algerians.

As the "sanitary" measures proved inadequate in sufficiently controlling immigration, the government revised the principle of free movement through the Nekkache-Grandval agreements of April 1964. These agreements introduced a "tourist" visa and mandated Algerian nationals to possess a residence certificate or an "ONAMO" work permit issued by the Office National de la Main-d'Œuvre. A classified clause, as identified by sociologist Alexis Spire, authorized an initiative to "repatriate the idle"ː

"Algerian nationals (...) without employment or resources (...) may be repatriated to Algeria by the French government, unless humanitarian reasons prevent it."

The circular issued on April 17, 1964, stipulates that the prefecture is solely responsible for determining the repatriation cases without any possibility of appeal.

=== Arenc warehouse as a clandestine immigration prison ===
The Arenc center, starting from May 1964, was placed under the direct control of the port's specialized police station, and detention, originally reserved only for "non-admitters," was expanded to include people who were being expelled by ministerial order (arrêté ministériel - A.M.). Also, "idle" Algerians who were in the process of being repatriated, according to a prefectoral decision (décision préfectorale - D.P.), were also included. On July 17, 1964, the Ministry of the Interior notified the Bouches-du-Rhône Prefect regarding the same matterː

"As the Algerian nationals in question are not subject to a custodial sentence, it is important that during their stay at the center, surveillance measures are strictly limited to those necessary to prevent their escape [sic]."

The hunt for "fake Algerian tourists", followed by a so-called "fight against substandard housing", whose aim was in fact to prevent the arrival of the wives and children of Algerians living in Marseille, led to an increase in the number of expulsions: in 1965, over 11,400 people passed through the Arenc center. By the end of the 1960s, the number of Moroccan, Tunisian, Malian and Senegalese nationals at the center was increasing.

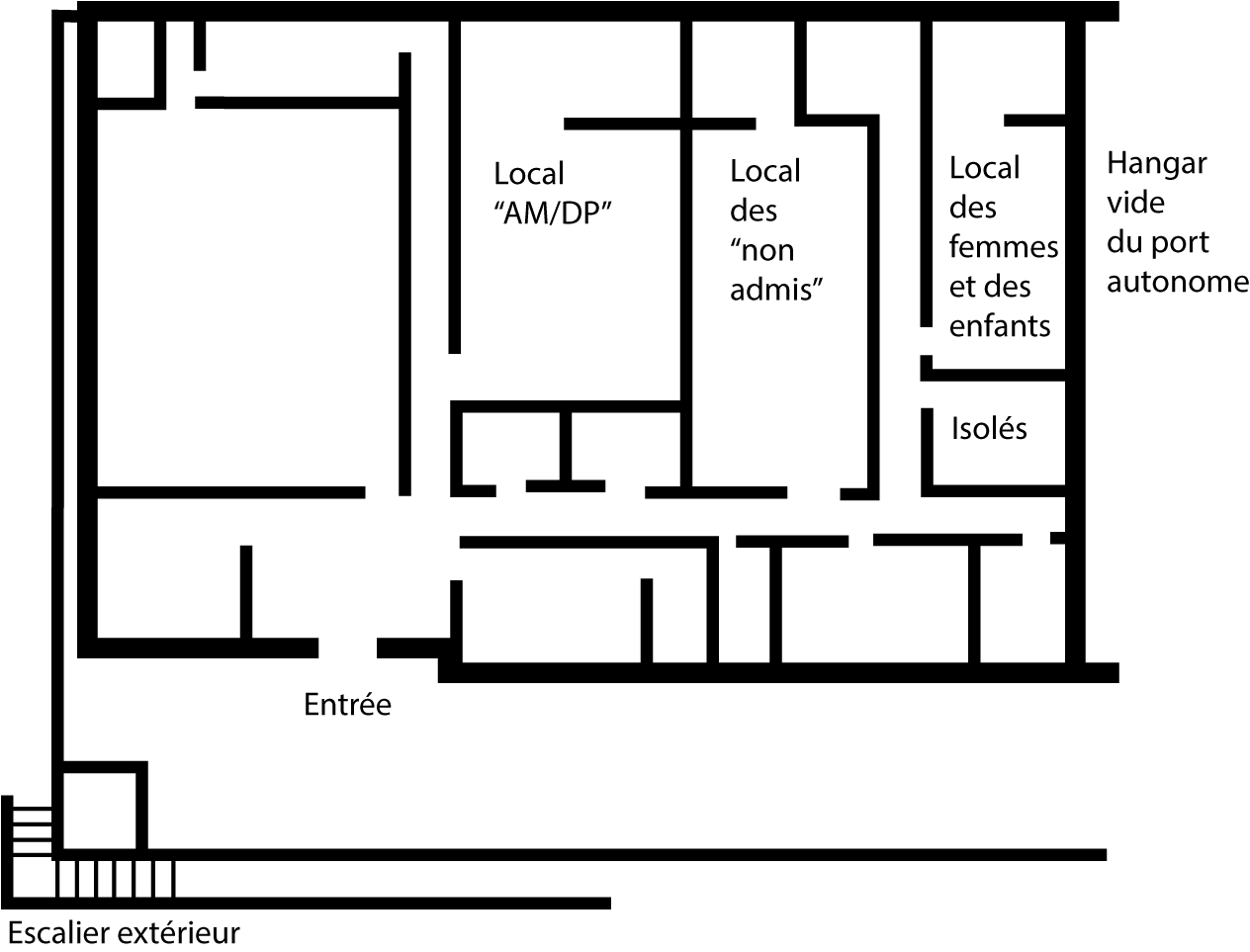
Plan of the warehouse. Alex Panzani identifies the large room as "des Africans".

Detainees in Arenc are unable to appeal deportation decisions or contact legal counsel. The confinement conditions are quite dire, with rundown facilities and intermittent heating, and the center lacked showers. Meals consisted of two hard-boiled eggs, a ration of cheese, a slice of bread, and a can of sardines, which some inmates have utilized in suicide attempts. Notably, in 1969, a hunger strike was suppressed through the expulsion of the "ringleaders." The premises consisted of three main dormitories: one for "AM/DP" (nationals subject to a ministerial order or prefectoral decision), one for women and children, and another for "non-admis" (rejected upon entry). Additionally, there was a small room designated for solitary confinement.

The association Aide aux travailleurs d'outre-mer (ATOM), which has been appointed by the prefecture to manage several social reception centers in Marseille, was responsible for cleaning and laundering the dormitories.

According to a press release from the Ministry of the Interior dated April 22, 1975, a total of 3,299 individuals were detained at Arenc in 1974.

== Detentions of Mohamed Chérif and Saïd Bennia ==
The Arenc affair began with the revelation that the police had taken Mohamed Chérif into custody without his consent. Mohamed Chérif, a Moroccan citizen and supporter of the MTA, was legally residing in Marseille with a valid permit for residency. He worked as a fisherman and had filed a complaint in August 1974, reporting that he was subjected to brutality while on the grounds of the Moroccan consulate. During his civil hearing, an attaché of the consul threatened him with deportation to Morocco. On April 11, 1975, Mohamed Chérif disappeared after attending a meeting at the prefecture. His friends informed Sixte Ugolini, who was in charge of the local syndicat des avocats de France (SAF), about the existence of a clandestine detention center near the Arenc ferry terminal.

On April 15, 1975, Saïd Bennia, an Algerian national born in 1956 in Marseille and a client of Sixte Ugolini, was arrested by the police immediately after he was judged free by the court. His parents followed the police van to the entrance of the Arenc prison where he was incarcerated.

On April 16, 1975, Sixte Ugolini called a press conference to denounce what he deemed a kidnapping due to the lack of news regarding Mohamed Chérif's appearance before the public prosecutor's office within the legal period of police garde à vue. Journalist Alex Panzani reported that "immigrant circles" were aware of the center's existence while historian Ed Naylor hypothesized that Sixte Ugolini's surprise during the press conference may have been staged as part of a media move.

The conference's success ultimately resulted in Mohamed Chérif's immediate release. He was in Sète at the time, with his departure for Morocco impending. Upon his return to Marseille, he informed his lawyer through an interpreter that he had been coerced into signing incomprehensible documents before being confined in a warehouseː

"On April 11, I went to the police summons, in an office on the second floor. A policeman called twice, and I recognized the word 'prefecture', which came up a lot. Then he told me: "You're going back to your country. You have to sign this paper. I don't read French. I asked what it meant, but the policeman said, "You have to sign it, it's legal." So I signed. And I waited. An hour and a half later, I was taken by van to a warehouse in La Joliette. I stayed there for six days. In this warehouse with its barred windows, there were fifty to sixty people, including two women. We slept on bunk beds. We were guarded by six or seven uniformed policemen. On April 16, at 1pm, I was taken in a van to the Sète police station with five other Moroccans who were to be deported like me aboard the cargo ship Agadir. At around 9.30pm, the police came to collect my companions. They left me behind. But at around 10pm, they told me: "You can go to Marseille, you're free...".

Saïd Bennia was released on April 16 by the Prefecture of Police's order. This information is evidenced by the margin entry of his name in the register for the Arenc center.

Published photographs in La Marseillaise on April 19, 1975 establish detention activity in the warehouse, elevating the incident to a national level. On April 22, 1975, the Ministry of the Interior attempted to dispel the controversy surrounding Arenc prison by denying the existence of a secret center. It stated that Arenc was actually a "transit center" that had been legally established in 1964 and housed individuals who were denied entry into France, foreign nationals who had received an administrative expulsion order, and illegal immigrants. However, neither Mohamed Chérif nor Saïd Bennia fell under these categories. Following this, a "collective against Arenc prison" was formed in Marseille. The presence of a contentious detention facility in Paris is brought to light.

A Marseilles resident, Salah Berrebouh, was sent to Algeria and barred from attending court proceedings; however, he later clarified the details of his deportation to the judge once he returned to France. Berrebouh filed a complaint against X for an unlawful arrest, unjustified confinement, and deprivation of liberty. He was subsequently released without charge. Berrebouh's case was dismissed in December 1978.

In late April 1975, Minister of the Interior Michel Poniatowski defended the center's existence, disregarding police custody regulationsː

"There's no mystery or drama (...) This is a temporary accommodation center for foreign nationals who have been refused entry. The fact is, and this is why I have taken steps to open up additional appropriations, that the accommodation conditions were inadequate."

On April 30, 1975, during a session of the National Assembly, Jean Lecanuet, France's Minister of Justice stated that there were no detention centers in France, clarifying that the "transit center" was not a clandestine facility. However, he avoided answering a question from Paul Cermolacce, a Communist deputy from Bouches-du-Rhône, who inquired about why the public prosecutor's office had opened an investigation. The Syndicat de la Magistrature deemed the center completely illegal due to its clandestine nature and demanded its closure. However, their efforts proved to be unsuccessful.

Gustave Essaka, a Cameroonian national who had been detained in the center for almost a month without an arrest warrant or conviction, was eventually deported and returned to Marseille before filing a complaint. The apparent legality of detention is once more in doubt when Enrico Fernandez Rodriguez, a Spanish detainee, is admitted to the detainee ward at Hôpital de la Conception on May 17 after attempting to escape and injuring himself. The public prosecutor's office decides to transfer Rodriguez to the main ward despite the lack of judicial supervision over him. It is worth noting that Rodriguez was eventually released from the hospital.

On May 29, 1975, Judge Locques conducted a search of the center in response to complaints of sequestration. The Syndicat des avocats de France expressed satisfaction with the search. Prior to the judge's arrival, the guards received instructions to release a family with six children. Although Judge Locques deemed the complaints to be well-founded, the Aix-en-Provence public prosecutor's office sought the dismissal of the case. In 1977, the case was referred to the Criminal Division of the French Cour of Cassation, which implicated the Marseille Prefect of Police. Following this, the Interior Ministry could no longer deny the existence of Arenc and attempted regulation by issuing a circular on November 21, 1977, and a decree in December 1978. Finally, the civil parties were dismissed on November 14, 1978.

On June 14, 1975, approximately one thousand people gathered in Marseille for a demonstration demanding the immediate closure of Arenc prison and the indictment of those responsible. The event was organized by the Committee for the closure of Arenc prison, according to which around one thousand people attended, while the police estimated the number to be 550. Protest declined during the 1975 summer months, but in September, it was reignited by the release of the book Une prison clandestine de la police française, Arenc by Alex Panzani. a journalist for La Marseillaise who was involved in the investigation.

== Legislative aftermath ==
At a National Assembly session on November 24, 1976, Interior Minister Michel Poniatowski addressed Communist deputy Paul Cermolacce's concerns about the Arenc center, citing it as a more humane alternative to prison. Poniatowski stated that under article 120 of the penal code, individuals could be sent to prison, but to avoid harsh conditions, they are instead sent to the Arenc accommodation center.

The Barre administration endeavored to establish a legal basis for this practice retrospectively via a circular dated November 21, 1977, which proposed termination of employing the Arenc center and substitution with confinement in "a penitentiary establishment for a period not exceeding seven days". However, the circular was nullified by the Conseil d'État on a matter of form. On December 9, 1978, the government enacted a decree restricting detention to "the time strictly necessary for the effective execution of the expulsion". Protests persisted throughout the streets of Marseille.

In early 1979, Interior Minister Christian Bonnet proclaimed a new administrative detention law, permitting detention for a maximum of seven days that could only be extended by court order. However, the bill faced severe opposition from legal experts and members of the French National Assembly and Senate. Opposition deputy Raymond Forni cited article 66 of the Constitution, stating that "no one may be arbitrarily detained" and voiced his objections. Article 3 of the bill permits the detention of foreigners who have been denied permission to enter or reside on French territory. The sole intention of this provision is to legitimize the arbitrary practices carried out in centers like Arenc. The Constitutional Council invalidated the law on January 9, 1980, citing that "individual liberty can only be safeguarded if the judge intervenes as soon as possible". However, detention was still deemed justifiable under the December 9, 1978 decree.

Finally, Gaston Defferre proposed a law that was passed on October 29, 1981, after François Mitterrand was elected. This legalization of detention was the paradoxical result of activist activity against Arenc.

In 1999, Sixte Ugolini commented on the ongoing tightening of detention laws since Arenc was exposed to the publicː

"France has simply legalized this lawless situation, and for foreigners, nothing has changed. The interpretation of the law applied to them continues to reflect our society and the xenophobia that characterizes it."

== Epilogue ==
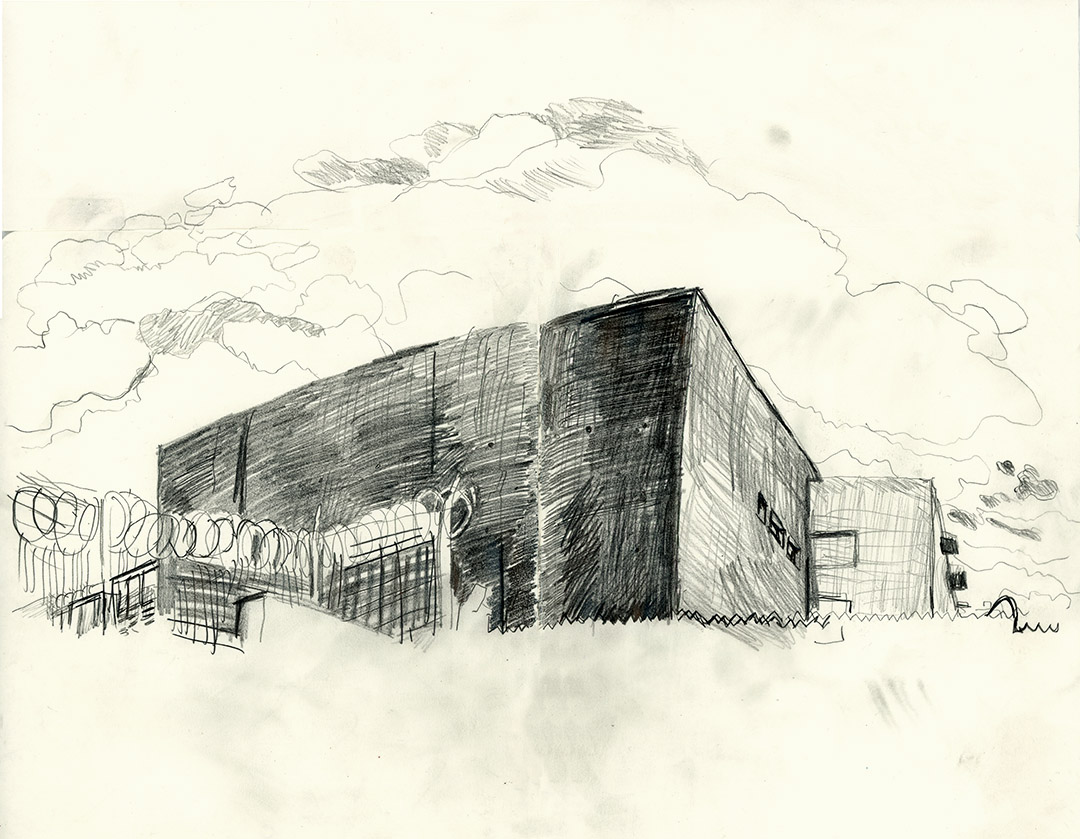
Le Canet detention center.

The European Committee for the Prevention of Torture published a report in 1996 exposing the dire living conditions caused by the deteriorating state of the Arenc warehouse. In 2006, the Council of Europe issued another report corroborating these findings. The responsible party remained in their position until 2006. The Arenc warehouse was replaced by a new building located in the Canet district of the 14th arrondissement. However, the public appeared indifferent towards this development. As soon as the new center opened, the Contrôleur général des lieux de privation de liberté, which serves as the French national watchdog for places of deprivation of liberty, noted that the accommodation conditions were unacceptable.

The Arenc warehouse was eventually demolished in 2009 and its location now serves as a parking lot for heavy goods vehicles on the port quays. In 2013, the Hangar J1, held the Marseille-Provence 2013, a significant exhibition about the Mediterranean and "the beginning of a random voyage" [sic], which did not mention this controversy.

Since 1978, approximately 100,000 individuals, including young children, have been detained at Arenc. According to a report by Mediapart, Saïd Bennia, who was born in Marseille, was arrested by the police in April 1975 and detained at Arenc. He was expelled 15 times, with the most recent occurrence taking place in 2000, before being admitted to a psychiatric ward.

The archives of the facility were deposited in 2007 and will be open for consultation at the Bouches-du-Rhône departmental archives in 2057.

== Bibliography ==
- Panzani, Alex (1975), Éditions Maspero (ed.), Une prison clandestine de la police française (in French), Arenc, ISBN 2-7071-0773-5, OCLC 2122419
- Spire, Alexis (2001), "Rétention: une indignation oubliée", Plein Droit (in French), 50 (3): 20, doi:10.3917/pld.050.0020, archived from the original on December 18, 2023
- "Arenc, le matin des centers de rétention: Enquête sur l'enfermement des étrangers à Marseille, de 1963 à 2006", Z: Revue itinérante d'enquête et de critique sociale (in French), vol. 2, no. 2, pp. 14–25, October 31, 2009, doi:10.3917/rz.002.0014, ISSN 2101-4787, archived from the original on December 18, 2023
- Ugolini, Sixte (2009), Autres temps (ed.), Derrière le barreau dans les coulisses de la justice, "Au secours le droit! La prison d'Arenc" (in French), Autres temps, ISBN 978-2-84521-376-0, OCLC 690401966
- Battegay, Alain (2014), Projet Lieux à mémoires multiples et enjeux d'interculturalité: le cas de deux lieux en cours de patrimonialisation. Montluc prison (Lyon) and the Arenc detention center (Marseille) (PDF) (in French), archived from the original on December 15, 2023
- Naylor, Ed (March 2014), "Le center d'Arenc (1963-2006): du refoulement des 'hébergés' à la rétention administrative" (PDF), researchportal.port.ac.uk (in French), archived from the original on May 19, 2024
- Naylor, Ed (2015), "Arenc: le premier center de rétention était clandestin", Plein Droit (in French), 104 (1): 32–36, doi:10.3917/pld.104.0032, archived from the original on January 12, 2022
- Lanux, Gérard (August 17, 2017), "Marseille : Arenc, une plaie toujours vive dans le cœur des étrangers", La Marseillaise (in French), archived from the original on November 30, 2021
- Bertrand, Olivier (April 26, 2020), "L'entrepôt clandestin de Marseille où la France enfermait les étrangers", Mediapart (in French), archived from the original on October 18, 2020

== See also ==
=== External links ===
External images
- Centre de Détention de Marseille Arenc, José Nicolas (gettyimages) (archive)
- Arenc detention center photographed by journalists on April 19, 1975 (archive)

- See this location on Google Street View archive.
