= Maison d'arrêt =

Category of prison

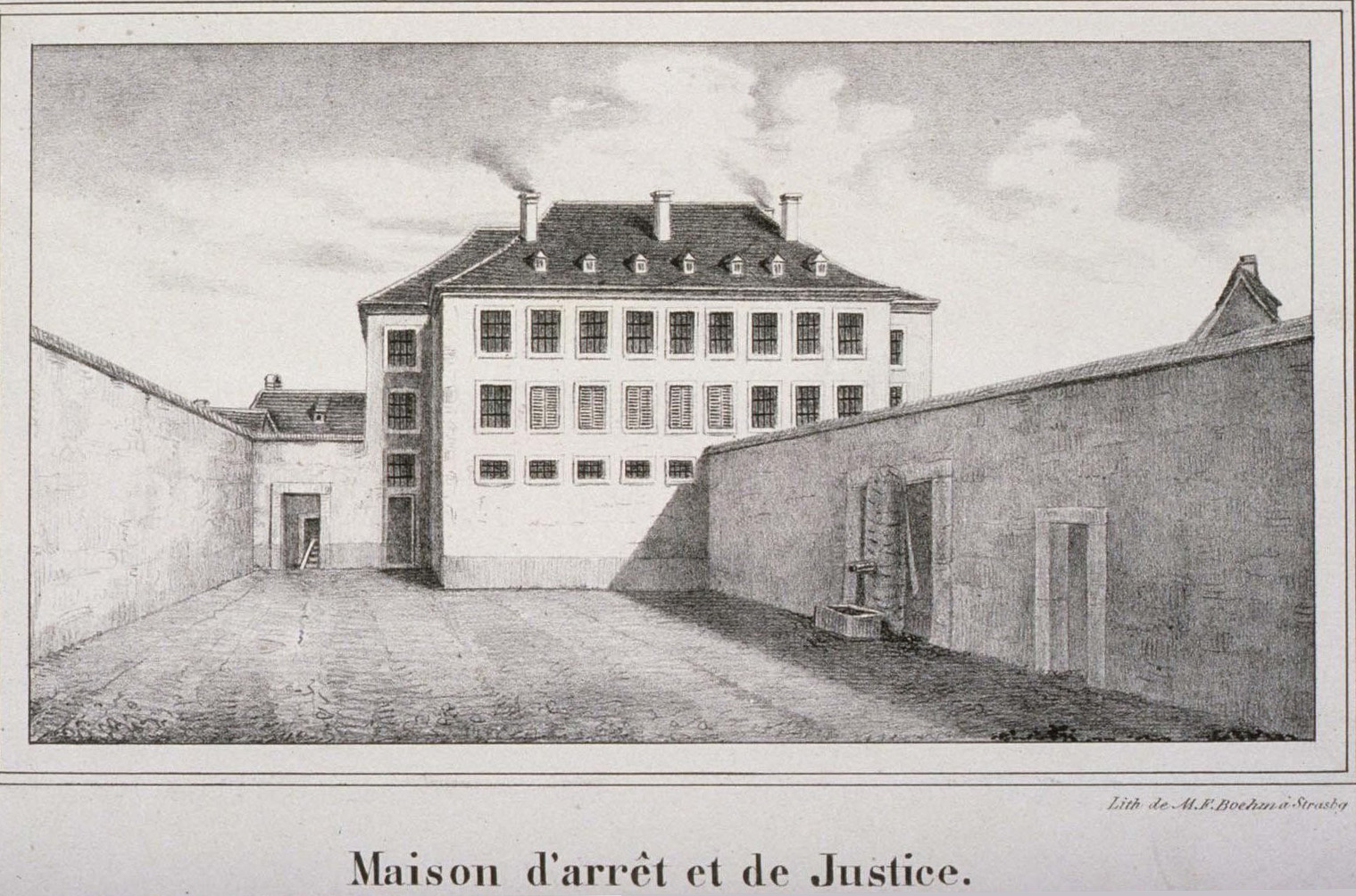
Maison d'arrêt in Strasbourg in the first half of the 19th century

Maisons d'arrêt ("houses of arrest") are one of three types of prison in France, Belgium, and other French-speaking countries. Maisons d'arrêt hold prisoners awaiting trial or sentencing, or those being held for less than one year.

== France ==
In France, Maisons d'arrêt suffered from overcrowding in the 2020s due to statutory limits in other prisons leading to prisoner overflow.

== Netherlands ==
In the Netherlands, Huis van bewaring or Huis van arrest have the same function; the name is a literal translation from the French.

== See also ==
- French criminal procedure
- Prison conditions in France
