= Aérohabitat =

Coordinates: 36°46′N 3°03′E

- Aérohabitat
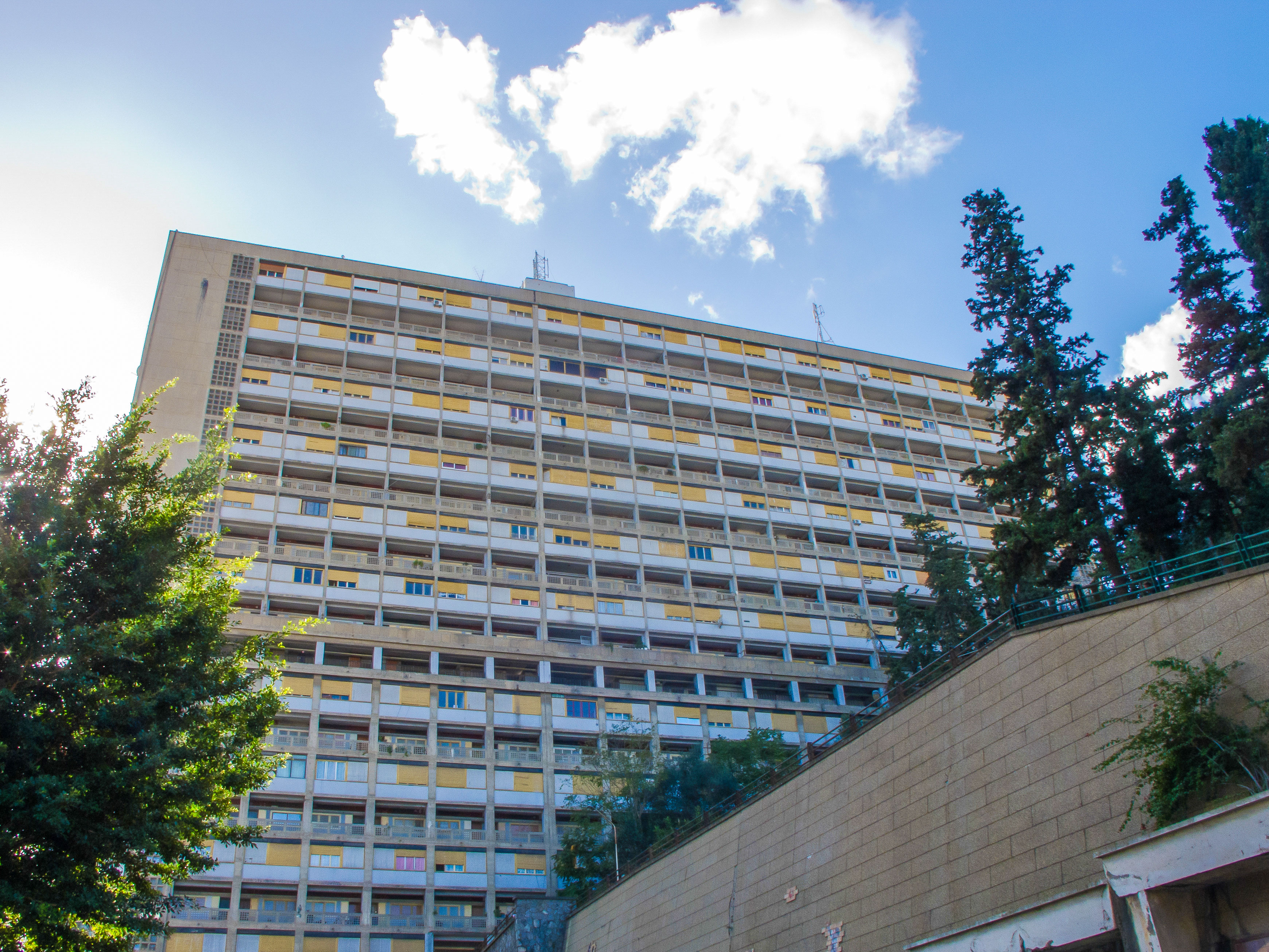
- Interactive map of Aérohabitat
- Location: Algiers
- Designer: Lucien Pierre-Marie
- Inauguration date: May 21, 1955

The Aérohabitat is a residence located in Algiers, built between 1952 and 1955 by Louis Miquel and José Ferrer-Laloë. Constructed as a raised horizontal block, it aimed to materialize a new form of city, a "vertical village" called Unité d'habitation (Housing Unit). It consists of four buildings and 300 apartments.

== History ==
The construction of the Aérohabitat is attributed to Louis Miquel, along with Pierre Bourlier and José Ferrer-Laloë, all members of CIAM-Algiers (International Congresses of Modern Architecture). The construction work began in late 1951, and the Aérohabitat was inaugurated by the Minister of Reconstruction and Urbanism, Eugène Claudius-Petit, on May 21, 1955. The buildings started to be occupied afterward, except for the tunnel passage under Building 2 and the unfinished fencing.

== Architecture ==
The Aérohabitat falls within the concept of "immeuble-villas" initiated by the Swiss-French architect Le Corbusier.

Miquel incorporated the principle of an interior street at mid-height of the main building, resembling a commercial gallery.

In contrast to Le Corbusier's concept of internal circulation, Miquel opted for an exterior circulation system that serves the apartments.

The residence consists of four buildings and 300 apartments.
