= Eugène Pons =

Member of the French Resistance

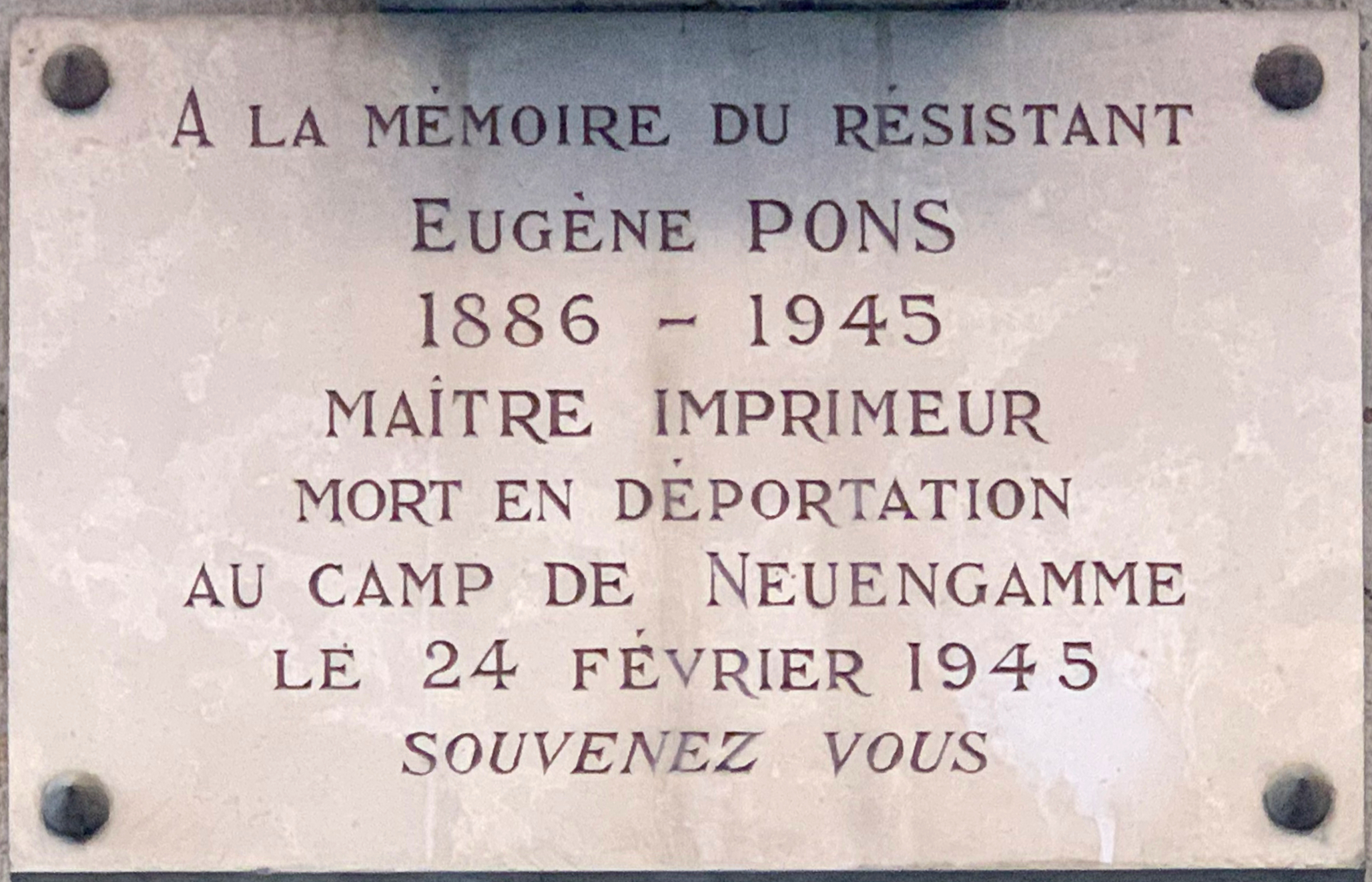
- Plaque dedicated to Pons in the 1st arrondissement of Lyon, France
- Born: Eugène Flavien Pons; May 5, 1886; Saint-Étienne, Loire, France
- Died: February 24, 1945 (aged 58); Bergedorf, Hamburg, Germany
- Other names: Papa Pons, La Source, Pilate
- Occupations: Printer, resistant of French resistance
- Organization(s): 371st Infantry Regiment, France Le Sillon Young Republic League
- Movement: Macedonian front (1916-1918) World War I World War II
- Children: Marcel Pons
- Awards: Legion of Honour (1945) Croix de Guerre 1939–1945 (1945) Resistance Medal
- Imprisoned at: Montluc prison (1944) Neuengamme concentration camp (1944-1945)

Eugène Pons, born in Saint-Étienne on May 15, 1886, and deported to the Neuengamme concentration camp on February 24, 1945, was a Catholic figure from Lyon, and a French printer and Resistance fighter who specialized in printing underground newspapers. From 1940 to 1944, at his printing works on rue de la Vieille-Monnaie, he was responsible for printing Resistance newspapers, Témoignage chrétien, Combat, La Marseillaise and Franc-tireur. He was also responsible for the 25,000 copies of Le Faux Nouvelliste on December 31, 1943. Defending one of his print shop employees, he was arrested in May 1944 and deported to Neuengamme, where he died of exhaustion in 1945.

== Biography ==
=== Early years ===
Eugène Pons was the son of Claudine Jay, a schoolteacher from Saint-Héand, and Victor Pons (1847–1928), a journalist. His mother died when he was very young. He developed a strong spirituality from an early age, which led him to join Sillon, the Catholic movement founded by Marc Sangnier, in his teens.

He married Rose-Adrienne Lavarière in Caluire-et-Cuire on January 28, 1913, while living in the Bissardon district. His wife, an embroiderer, lived on rue Diderot in Lyon. Their first child, Marcel Pons, was born on January 13, 1913.

In 1914, he was called up to fight in the First World War, joining the 371st infantry regiment. He was sent to Greece to take part in the Macedonian Front, during which he contracted malaria.

Eugène Pons returned to Lyon in 1918. He soon found work as an accountant in an umbrella factory. He then worked in the same capacity for a fruit and vegetable company.

=== Interwar period ===
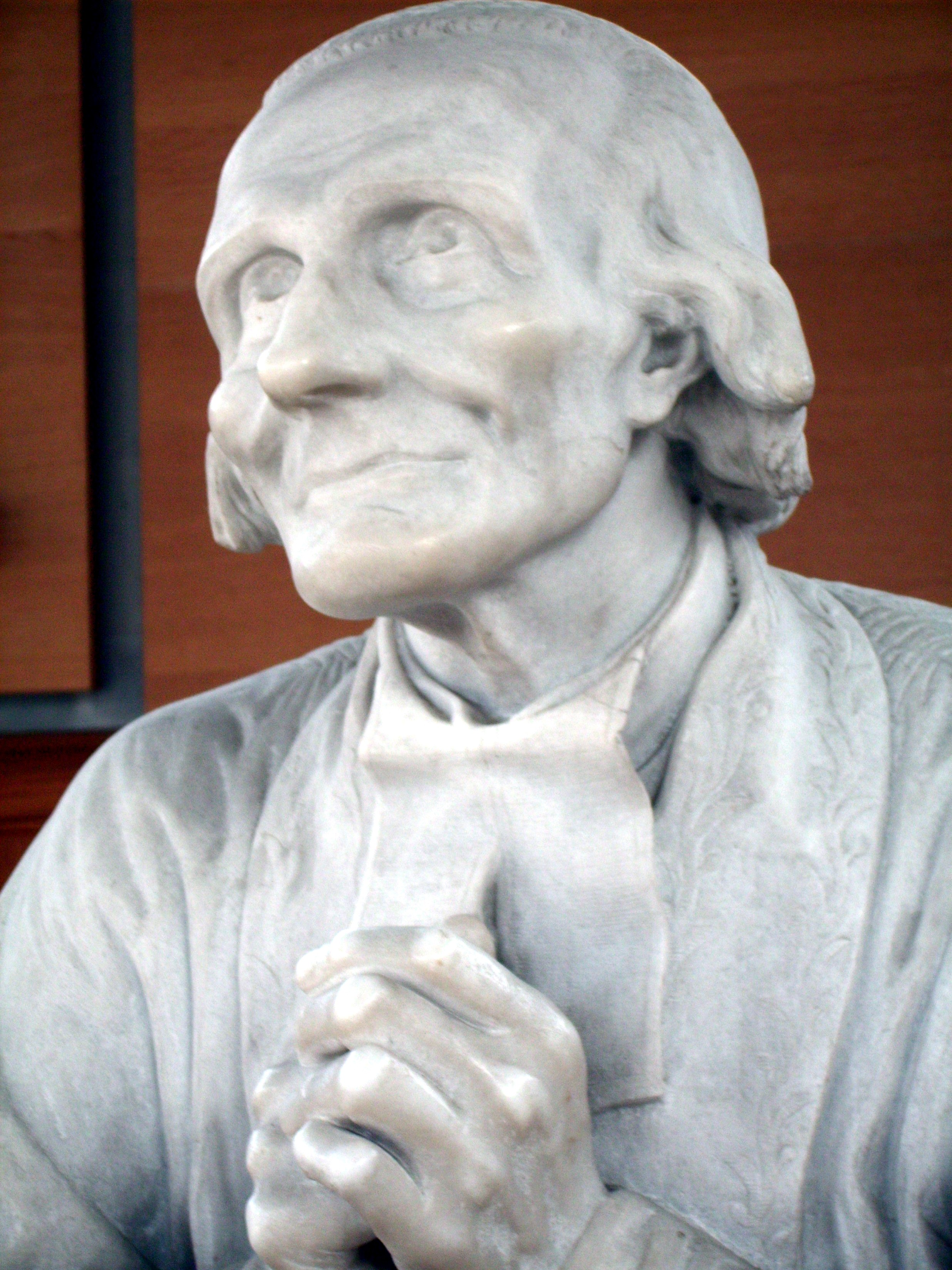
Le Curé d'Ars in prayer by Émilien Cabuchet.

On his return from the war, Eugène Pons resumed his spiritual activities with the Sillon group in Lyon, formed before the war. In this movement, he rediscovered his profound orientation towards social Catholicism. Indeed, Le Sillon, founded in 1894 by Marc Sangnier, aims not only to offer a response to Pope Leo XIII's encyclical Rerum novarum, advocating greater openness of the Church towards the world, but also, and more prosaically, to bring Catholicism closer to the working world by offering a political and spiritual alternative to communism.

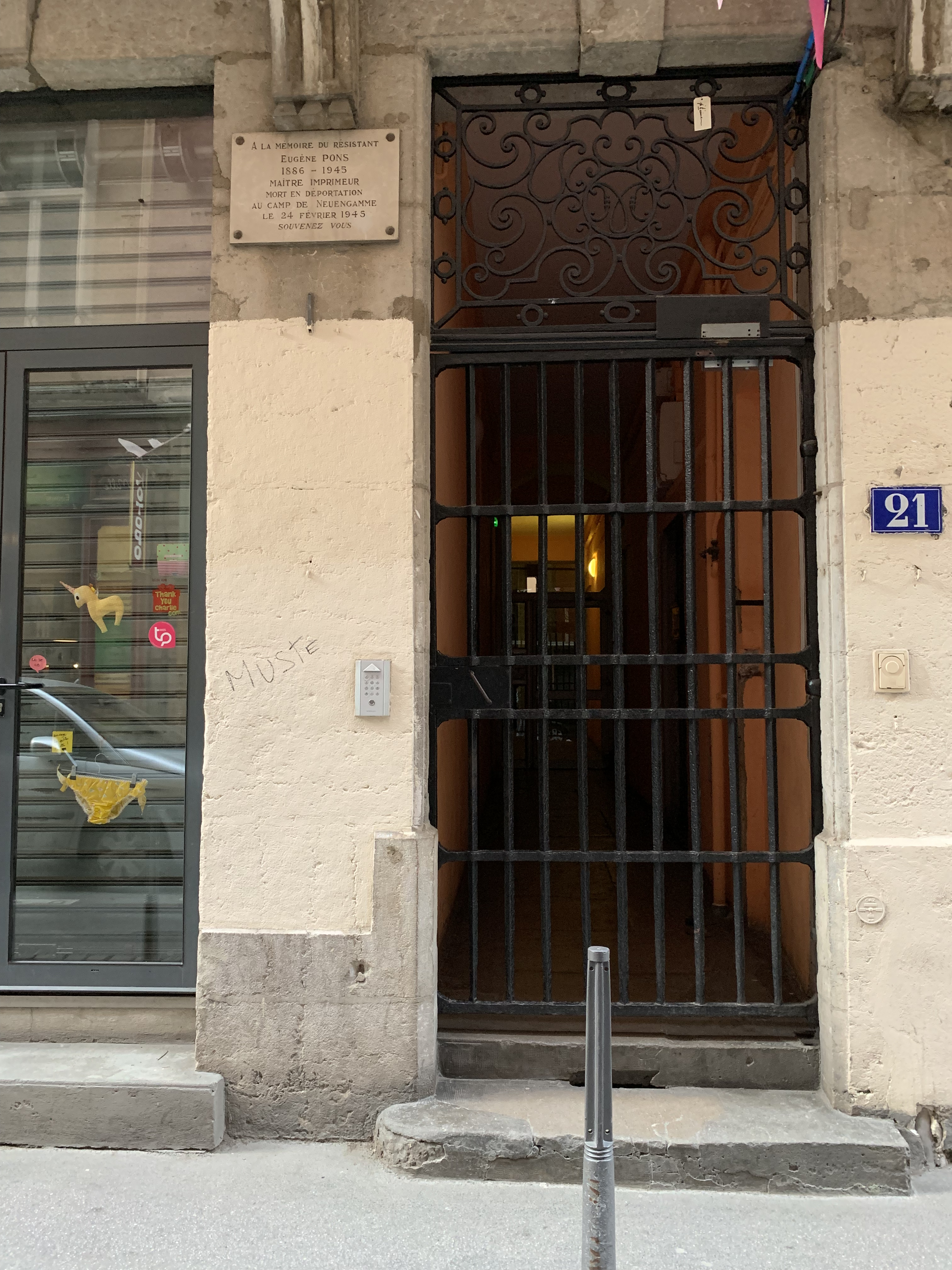
21 rue de la Vieille-Monnaie, where the Imprimerie de la Source once stood.

He also became involved in politics, joining the Ligue de la jeune République, a political party also founded by Marc Sangnier. Locally, it aimed to oppose Édouard Herriot's all-powerful and rather anti-clerical radical-socialist party. Eugène Pons soon organized Lyon meetings at his home on rue Denfert-Rochereau, attended by Joseph Folliet and Sylvie Mingeolet (1903–1955). The various gatherings of the Lyonnais group enabled them to socialize with invited personalities such as Paul Claudel.

His daily life and that of his family revolved around the Catholic faith and prayer. He took part in parish activities at Notre-Dame-Saint-Alban church and later at Saint-Eucher church in Lyon. Pilgrimage was also an important part of his life: he made an annual pilgrimage to the Basilica of Ars to pay homage to the Curé d'Ars. Another frequent pilgrimage was between La Croix-Rousse and Fourvière hill after work.

In Saint-Alban, Eugène Pons assisted Abbé Laurent Remillieux (1882–1949), (Note: There is a street l'Abbé-Laurent-Remillieux in Lyon. On OpenStreetMap: link) the founder of the parish. Among other things, he helped him organize educational activities for the Jeunesse ouvrière chrétienne.

Eugène Pons was also an accomplished sportsman. He was a member of the Le Patriote sports club, which depended on the parish church of Saint-Denis-de-la-Croix-Rousse, and excelled at rifle shooting. He also swam down the Rhône several times across Lyon.

Eugène Pons seized a business opportunity that came to him through his friend Georges Neveu. Victor Carlhian acquired the Imprimerie de la Source at 21 rue de la Vieille-Monnaie and was looking for a manager. He recruited Eugène Pons for the job, and Pons became the printer. He was in charge of printing various philosophical and ecumenical brochures and newspapers. By 1940, Eugène Pons was managing a team of some twenty people working in the print shop.

== World War II ==
=== Resistance ===
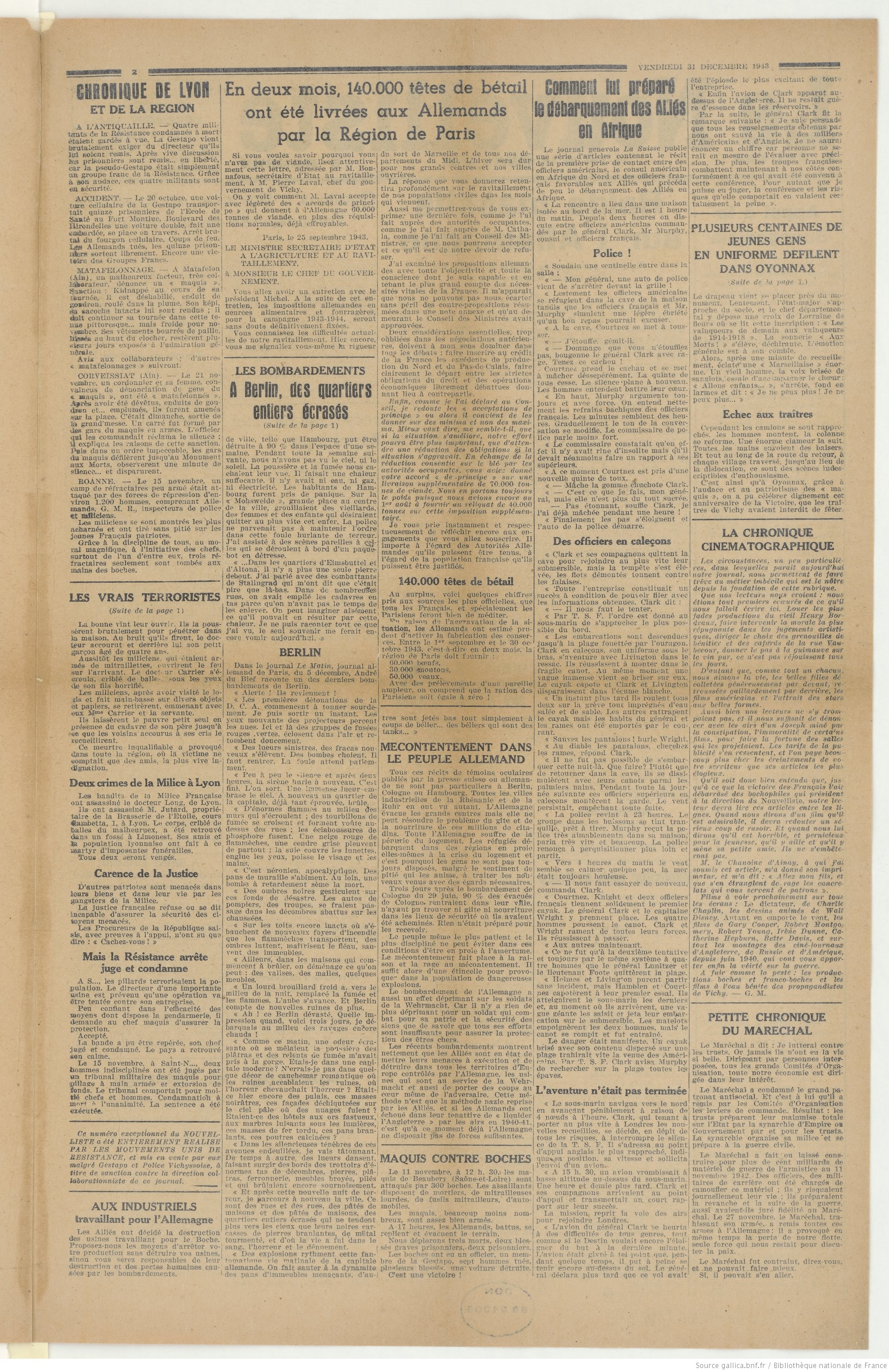
Page 2 of the Faux Nouvelliste.

As early as 1940, Eugène Pons considered joining London, but given his family responsibilities, he chose to join the Resistance. His first actions in the Resistance were to print leaflets he had written himself, appealing to Christian values. He immediately accepted a request from the communist resistance fighter André Liebherr to print communist leaflets, since the enemy, in his view, was above all Nazism.

In May 1941, at Jean Stetten-Bernard's request, Eugène Pons printed a leaflet explaining that the French people did not want to collaborate. He completed the job in one night.

In early 1942, Henri Chevalier decided to stop printing Franc-tireur at his printing works at 40 cours de la Liberté, probably for ideological reasons. Eugène Pons immediately took over the printing of the paper. He also worked regularly for André Bollier, printing the newspaper Combat. He also regularly printed the newspaper La Marseillaise.

He subsequently took on the task of printing the journal Témoignage chrétien. While the first two issues were printed in Villeurbanne by Joseph Martinet, Eugène Pons took charge of all subsequent issues, starting with No. 3 in March 1942, at the joint request of Père Chaillet and Louis Cruvillier. Louis Besacier, who was in charge of binding the newspapers, took over the printing of Témoignage chrétien when Eugène Pons was arrested in May 1944.

Until his arrest in 1944, the daytime activity of the printing works was quite ordinary: Eugène Pons and his employees printed a variety of brochures with complete legality. At night, on Saturdays and Sundays, the printing works are dedicated to printing underground newspapers. He was sometimes assisted by some of his employees, in particular, foreman Verrier, workers Charles Planchet (b. 1896), and his son-in-law Pierre Barnier (1920–1997), who was working at the printing works at the time.

On December 31, 1943, with the help of his son-in-law Pierre Barnier, he printed 25,000 copies of the Faux Nouvelliste a forged copy of the collaborationist newspaper Le Nouvelliste.

He had also been printing false papers for the Resistance since at least the beginning of 1942. This is confirmed by the testimony of resistance fighter Adrien Némoz, who writes:

"In 1940, Eugène Pons began printing whatever was asked of him. From memory, I can cite: France-Tireur, the clandestine Nouvelliste, false identity cards, passes authorizing the movement of people and goods, and at the beginning of 1942 the notebooks of Témoignage chrétien."

It also details Eugène Pons' humanist and spiritual motivations for joining the Resistance:

"At the turn of the century, his encounter with Marc Sangnier's Le Sillon [...] had convinced him that the Christian faith should inspire men's actions. Eugène Pons' resistance had both patriotic and spiritual motives [...] and it was essential to prevent the victorious Nazis from imposing their anti-Christian mysticism on the world."

=== Arrest and deportation ===
The Gestapo inspected the printing works at around midday on May 21 or May 22, 1944. No clandestine printed matter was found, although it seems that copies of Témoignage chrétien were on the premises. A worker, Charles Lang, of Alsatian origin, took charge of the translation. Once the inspection was complete, the Gestapo decided to take Charles Lang away on suspicion of being a German. Eugène Pons objected, demanding that his employee remain in the print shop as nothing incriminating had been found. In the end, it was both men - Charles Lang and Eugène Pons - who were taken away by the Gestapo.

Eugène Pons was first taken to Montluc prison, then sent to the Royallieu camp. On July 15, 1944, he was deported by train to the Neuengamme concentration camp. Charles Lang (born January 7, 1907, in Lyon) was also deported to Neuengamme, where he died on December 30, 1944.

Adrien Némoz was present at the printing works on the day Eugène Pons was arrested: the previous two days had been taken up with printing a booklet for Témoignage Chrétien entitled "Exigences de la libération". He left the premises fifteen minutes before the arrival of the Gestapo.

The Resistance quickly organized a rescue operation. Henri Frenay explains: under the direction of André Bollier, the sheets already printed, certain machine parts and sheets of blank paper are recovered from rue de la Vieille-Monnaie and transferred to rue Viala, where another clandestine printing work is located.

=== Neuengamme ===
Eugène Pons arrived at Neuengamme after four days on the train. In addition to the concentration camp environment, the inhuman conditions, the deprivation of food, and the physical violence of the guards, prisoners were required to work twelve hours a day: Eugène Pons was first assigned to transport stones on the canal, then to the braiding workshop where hair was transformed into ropes.

Dominican priest Claude Humbert (matricule 33221) met Eugène Pons at Neuengamme: they exchanged a few times through a grate. They prayed for the soldiers of Lyon and France, reciting the rosary of Simon the Zealot.

Eugène Pons, matricule 36921, died of exhaustion on February 24, 1945. The last person to see him alive was Maître Périssé, a lawyer in Toulouse, himself a prisoner at Neuengamme.

== Family ==
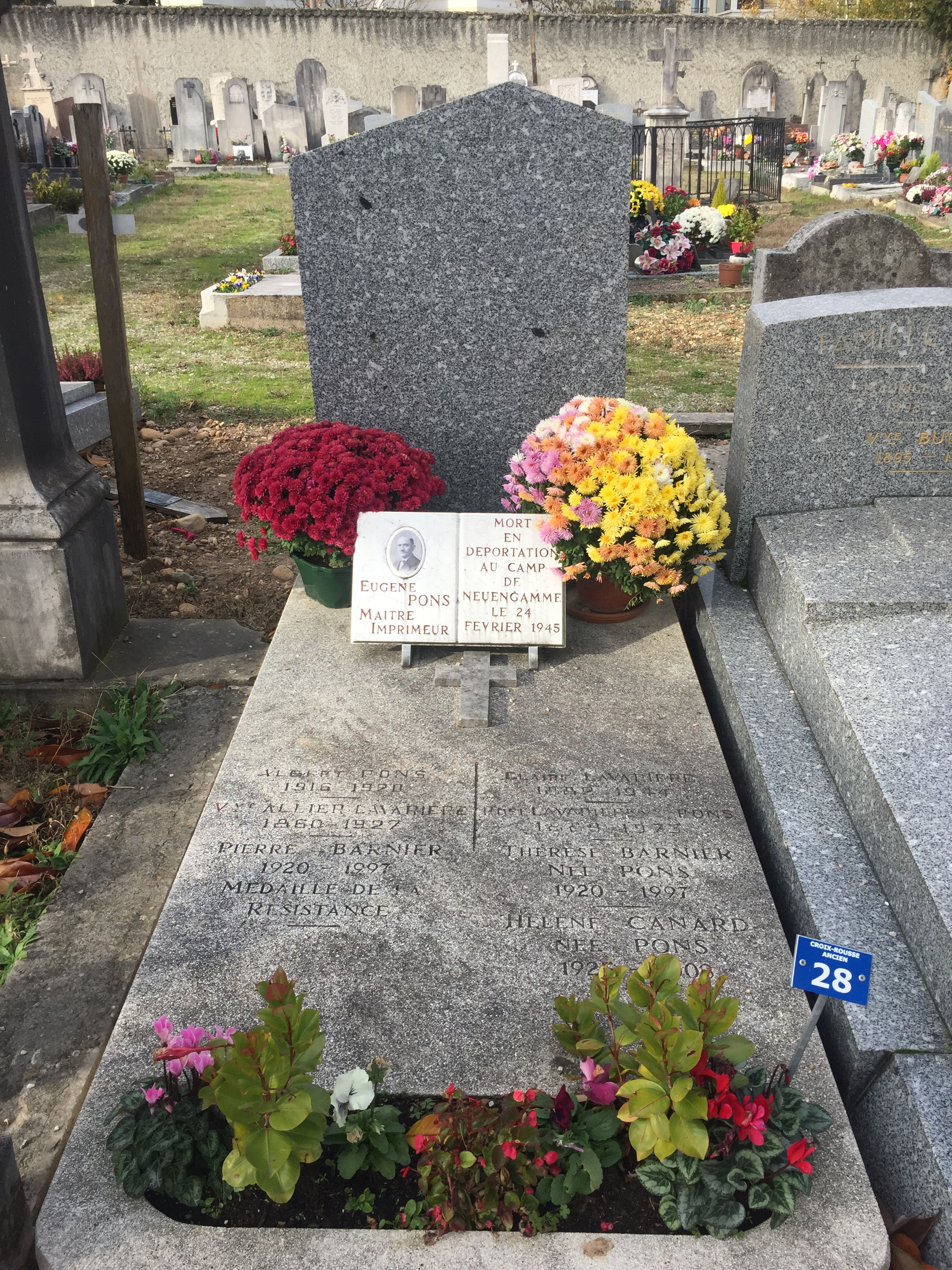
Pons family vault in the old Croix-Rousse cemetery. The white plaque on the tomb pays tribute to Eugène Pons.

Eugène Pons and Rose-Adrienne Lavarière (1888–1973) had seven children, two of whom died in infancy:

- Marcel Pons (January 13, 1913, in Caluire-et-Cuire - April 22, 2002, in Toulon), vicar and author of the biography of Eugène Pons;
- Georges Pons (February 10, 1915 - 1916);
- Albert Pons (June 22, 1916 - December 4, 1920);
- Thérèse Barnier, born Thérèse Pons (October 1920 - 1997), wife of Pierre Barnier (1920–1997), Médaille de la Résistance;
- Marie-Claude Thomasset, born Marie-Claude Pons;
- Hélène Canard, born Hélène Pons (1925 - 2003);
- André Pons (1930–2003).

== Tributes and awards ==
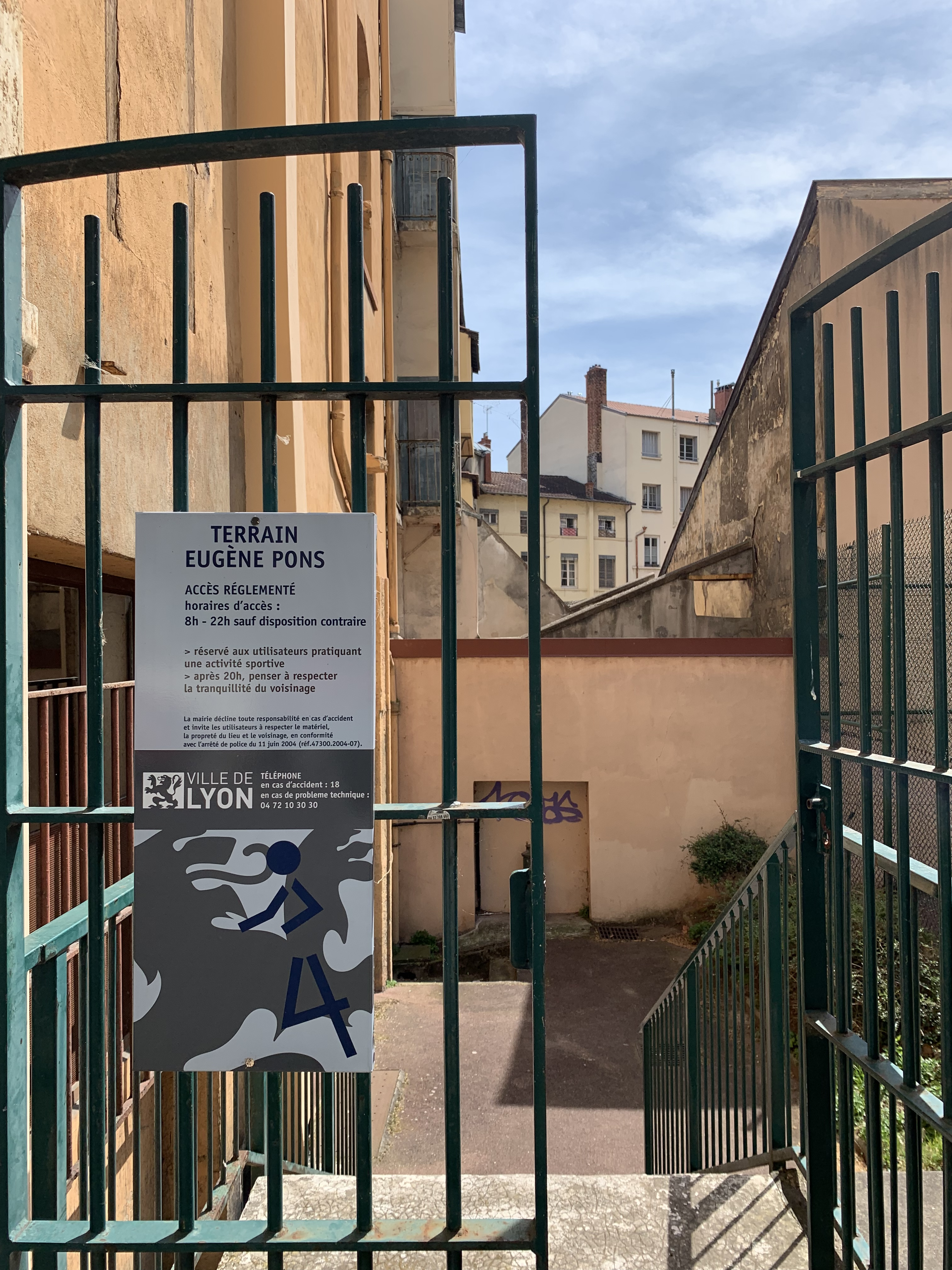
Entrance to the Eugène-Pons site in Lyon.

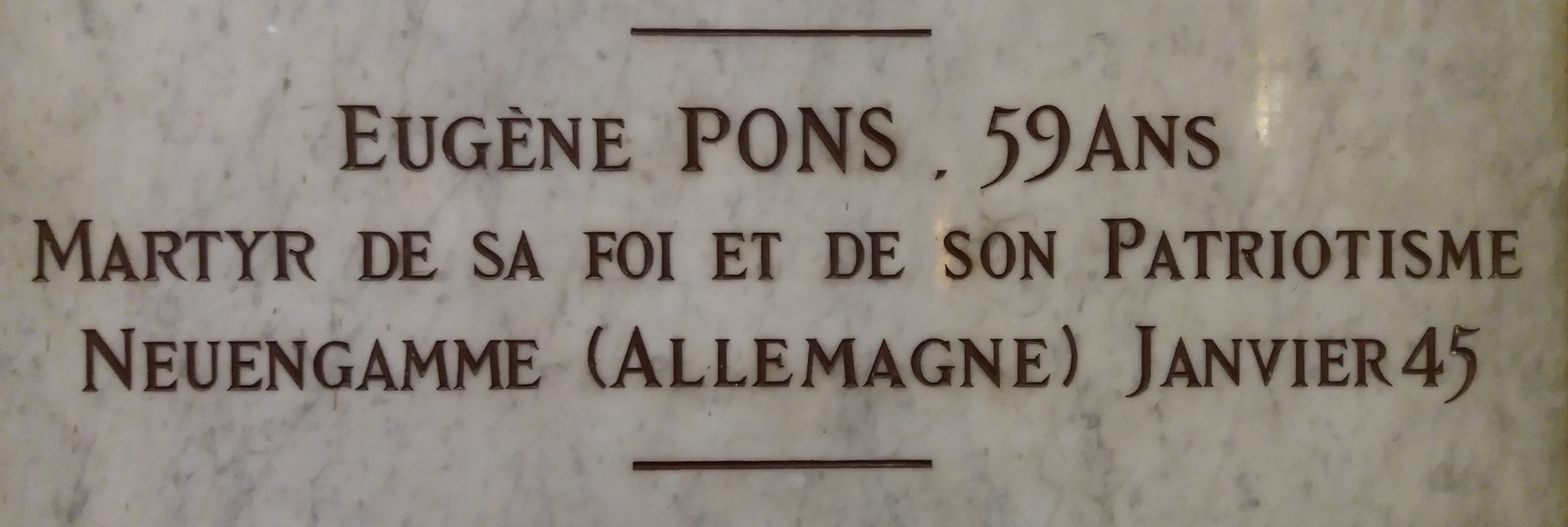
Commemorative plaque in Lyon's Saint-Eucher church.

Eugène Pons was posthumously awarded the Resistance medal, the Legion of Honor and the Croix de Guerre (with palms) in 1945.

A plaque is affixed to the premises where his printing works - l'Imprimerie de la Source - were located at 21 rue Vieille-Monnaie (now rue René-Leynaud). (Note: The rue René-Leynaud plaque on OpenStreetMap: link)

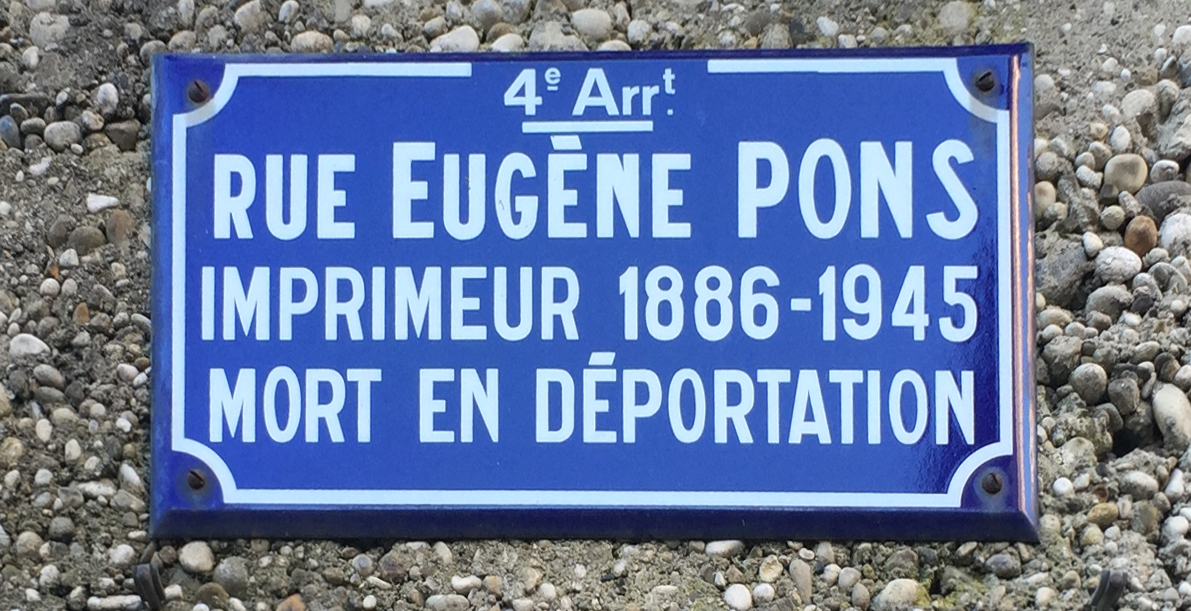
Plaque on rue Eugène-Pons in Lyon's 4th arrondissement.

There's a rue Eugène-Pons in Lyon. This long, steep street links the Cours d'Herbouville (which runs alongside the Rhône on its right bank) to Rue Artaud, and provides pedestrian access to the Croix-Rousse plateau from the Winston-Churchill bridge. (Note: Rue Eugène-Pons on OpenStreetMap: link) It was formerly known as rue de Dijon, and rue Lafayette under the Second Empire. It was renamed following a decision by Lyon's city council on November 26, 1945. At the same meeting, the city council decided to affix the plaque at 21 rue Vieille-Monnaie, where the Imprimerie de la Source was located, as well as the home of the Pons family.

His name is also inscribed on a collective plaque inside Lyon's Saint-Eucher church. Opposite the church gate on rue des Actionnaires is an Eugène-Pons basketball court. (Note: The Eugène-Pons site on OpenStreetMap: link)

There's also an avenue Eugène-Pons in Beauchamp, Val-d'Oise, (Note: Avenue Eugène-Pons de Beauchamp on OpenStreetMap: link) in a residential neighborhood where street names are dedicated to famous members of the French Resistance.

=== Testimonies ===
Eugène Pons' wife, Rose-Adrienne Lavarière, reportedly told their children the day after their father's arrest:

"France cannot be liberated without martyrs. If the Good Lord had wanted to choose Daddy to be one of them, it would be terrible, but we should be proud."

After the war, churchman Pierre Chaillet considered Eugène Pons to be "the noblest figure; one who inspires respect and friendship; one of the most valiant and discreet heroes of the Resistance". Resistance fighter Eugène Claudius-Petit expressed his esteem for Pons in the February 27, 1970 issue of Témoignage chrétien in an article entitled "A man at peace...", which he concluded as follows:

"We still have his friendship, and when the smells of ink, paper and hot machines mingle with the muffled, cadenced noises of the heavy platens, you're there my old Pons to tell us what a man is."

== See also ==
- French Resistance
- Eugène Claudius-Petit
- Henri Frenay

== Bibliography ==
- Pons, Marcel (1991). Eugène Pons: imprimeur, résistant, chrétien. Paris: Éditions du Témoignage chrétien. ISBN 2900016282.
- Némoz, Adrien (1991). Avoir 20 ans en 1940: témoignage chrétien d'un jeune résistant. Paris: Éditions du Témoignage chrétien. ISBN 2900016290.
- François; Bédarida, Renée (2001). La Résistance spirituelle: 1941-1944: les Cahiers clandestins du Témoignage chrétien. Paris: Albin Michel. ISBN 2900016290.
- Le Mer, Régis (2014). Imprimeurs clandestins à Lyon et aux alentours (1940-1944). Lyon: Lyon, Mémoire active. ISBN 978-2-908185-41-6.
- Lang, Silvère (2009). Artisan de paix: Eugène Pons (1886-1945) de Silvère Lang (DVD) (in French).
