= Henri de Guénégaud =

French politician (1610–1676)

- Seigneur du Plessis-Belleville; Seigneur de Fresnes
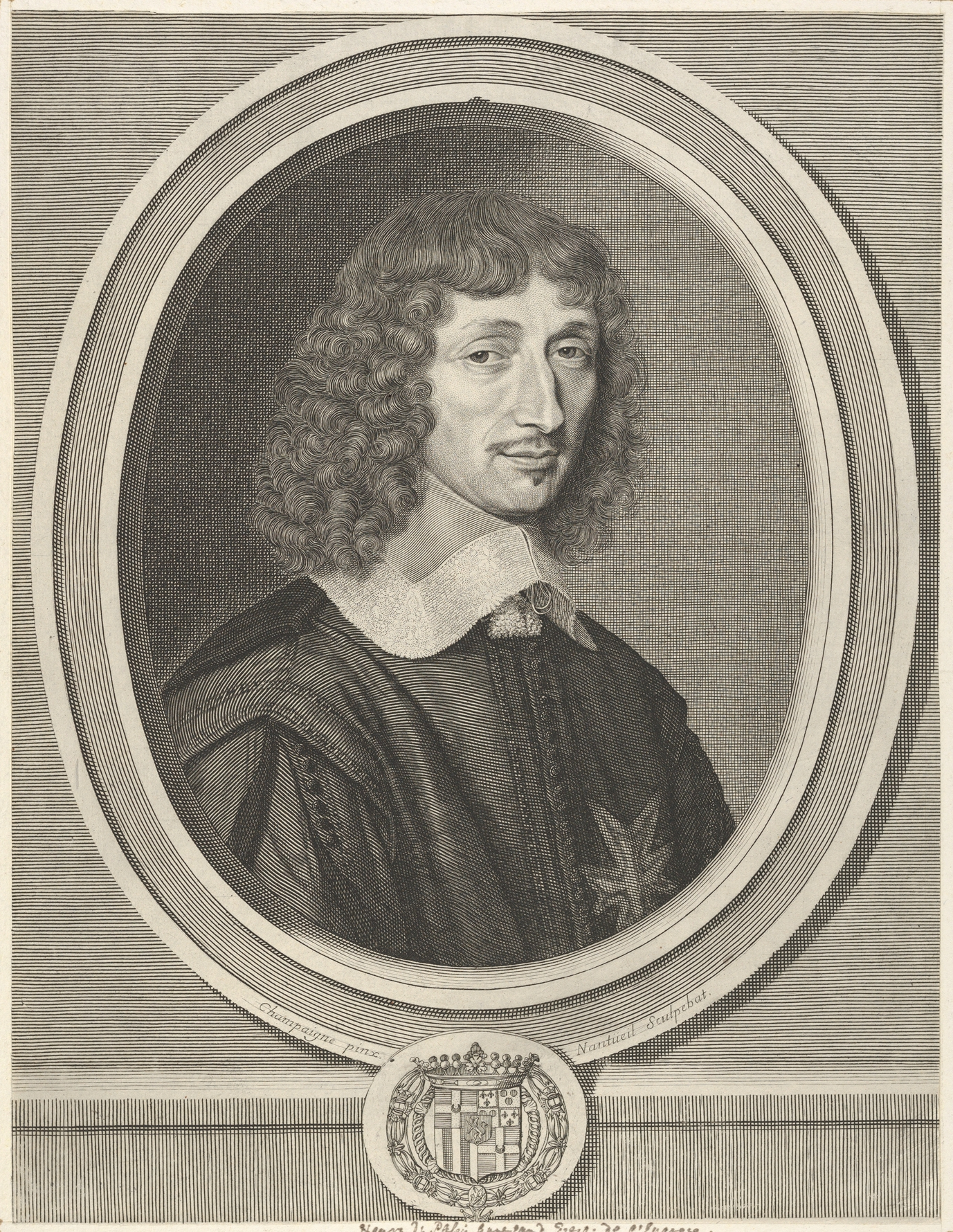
- Henri de Guénégaud by Robert Nanteuil
- Born: 1610
- Died: 16 March 1676 (aged 65–66)
- Spouse: Isabeau de Choiseul
- Father: Gabriel de Guénégaud, Seigneur du Plessis-Belleville
- Mother: Marie de La Croix, Dame du Plessis-Belleville

Henri du Plessis-Guénégaud, Lord of the Plessis-Belleville, Marquis de La Garnache (1610 – 16 March 1676) was a French scholar and a Secretary of State during the reigns of Louis XIII and Louis XIV.

== Career ==
Henri de Guénégaud became Trésorier de l'Épargne (Treasurer of Savings) in 1638, succeeding his father, who died that year.

In 1643, he became Secretary of State of several regions of France, including Paris, the Maison du Roi, and ecclesiastical affairs. He also became Secretary of State of the Navy that same year.

Dubuisson Aubenay, who later wrote a history of the Fronde, became his secretary in 1645.

He supported Anne d'Autriche during the Fronde and was made Garde des Sceaux in 1656, but was disgraced in 1669, when he was succeeded as Secretary of State by Jean-Baptiste Colbert.

== Family ==
He was the elder son of Gabriel Guénégaud, Lord of the Plessis-Belleville (died 1638), and Marie La Croix, Dame du Plessis-Belleville (died 1655).

In 1642 he married Elizabeth (Isabel), daughter of the Maréchal Charles de Choiseul, Marquis de Praslin.

Their children included:

- Gabriel 1643
- Caesar Phoebus +
- Roger 1645
- Claire Bénédicte 1646–1675
- Henry 1647–1722
- Emmanuel
- Elisabeth Angelique

He was the brother of Claude's treasurer, brother-in-law of César d'Albret who married his sister Madeleine.

== Residences ==
Guénégaud was a patron of the architect François Mansart and possibly a friend. In 1642 he gave Mansart the site for Mansart's house in the Rue Payenne, and in 1650 he gave the architect 50,000 livres.

In 1646 Guénégaud purchased the Hôtel de Nevers on the Quai de Nevers (just east of the Tour de Nesle) and commissioned Mansart to transform it into the Hôtel de Guénégaud (1648–1652). He also had Mansart make alterations to the Château de Fresnes.

He and his wife, who were known for their Jansenist sympathies, held a famous salon at their hôtel on the Quai de Nevers. Among their friends were Mademoiselle de Scudéry, Madame de Sévigné, and Simon Arnauld. It was at their salon that Racine first became known in Paris.

In 1670, after his disgrace, Guénégaud exchanged the Hôtel de Guénégaud on the Quai de Nevers for a country house in Bouchet and the Hôtel de Conti on the Quai Malaquais in Paris, both belonging to Cardinal Mazarin's niece Anne-Marie Martinozzi, Princesse de Conti. Thereafter the house on the Quai Malaquais became known as the Hôtel du Plessis-Guénégaud, and the house on the Quai de Nevers, as the Hôtel de Conti.

== Offices ==
- Secretary of State for the Royal Household in 1643 to 1669 under Louis XIV
- State Secretary of the Navy 23 March 1643 to 1662 under Louis XIII and Louis XIV
- Keeper of the Seals of the Order of the Holy Spirit
- Advisor to the King and treasurer of his savings

== Bibliography ==
- Braham, Allan; Smith, Peter (1973). François Mansart. London: A. Zwemmer. ISBN 9780302022511.

Political offices
Preceded by Henri Auguste de Loménie	Minister for the Maison du Roi; 1643–1669	Succeeded by Jean-Baptiste Colbert
Preceded by Henri Auguste de Loménie	Minister of the Navy and the Colonies; 1643–1662	Succeeded by Hugues de Lionne
