= Minister for the Maison du Roi =

The Minister for the Maison du Roi was a cabinet role under the French monarchy, conferring leadership of the Maison du Roi.

== Ancien Régime ==
Under the Ancien Régime the ministerial post at the head of the Maison du Roi was a Secrétaire d'État à la Maison du Roi (Secretary of State of the Maison du Roi).

=== 1570-1789 ===
- 1570–1579 : Simon Fizes, baron de Sauves
- 1579–1588 : Villeroy Brulard
- 1579–1588 : Claude Pinard, seigneur de Comblisy et de Cramailles
- 1588–1613 : Martin Ruzé, Seigneur de Beaulieu
- 1588–1594 : Louis de Revol
- 1606–1638 : Antoine de Loménie
- 1615–1643 : Henri Auguste de Loménie, sieur de Brienne
- 1643–1669 : Henri du Plessis-Guénégaud, sieur du Plessis-Belleville
- 1669–1683 : Jean-Baptiste Colbert, également contrôleur général des finances
- 1672–1690 : Jean-Baptiste Colbert, marquis de Seignelay
- 1690–1699 : Louis Phélypeaux (1643-1727), comte de Pontchartrain
- 1693–1715 : Jérôme Phélypeaux, comte de Pontchartrain
- 1715–1718 : Louis Phélypeaux, marquis de La Vrillière
- 1718–1749 : Jean Frédéric Phélypeaux, marquis de Maurepas
- 1749–1775 : Louis Phélypeaux, marquis de La Vrillière, comte de Saint-Florentin
- 1775–1776 : Chrétien-Guillaume de Lamoignon de Malesherbes
- 1776–1783 : Antoine-Jean Amelot de Chaillou
- 1783–1787 : Louis Auguste Le Tonnelier de Breteuil
- 1788–1789 : Pierre-Charles Laurent de Villedeuil

== Constitutional monarchy ==
- 19 July 1789 – 25 January 1791 : François-Emmanuel Guignard, comte de Saint-Priest.

== Bourbon Restoration ==
- 29 May 1814 – 20 March 1815 : Pierre Jean Casimir, duc de Blacas d'Aulps
- 1 November 1820 – 4 August 1824 : Jacques Alexandre Law de Lauriston
- 4 August 1824 – 4 January 1828 : Ambroise-Polycarpe de La Rochefoucauld, duc de Doudeauville.

== July Monarchy ==
Louis-Philippe of France had no household and thus there was no minister for the Maison du Roi under the July Monarchy. However, there was an intendant général of the civil list, who was not a member of the government.

- 10 October 1830 – 2 November 1830 : Camille de Montalivet (provisional intendant of crown grants)
- 2 November 1830 – 10 October 1832 : Agathon Jean François Fain
- 10 October 1832 – 22 February 1836 : Camille de Montalivet
- 22 February 1836 – 6 September 1836 : Agathon Jean François Fain
- 6 September 1836 – 15 April 1837 : Camille de Montalivet
- 15 April 1837 – 31 March 1839 : Pierre-Marie Taillepied de Bondy
- 31 March 1839 – 2 February 1848 : Camille de Montalivet

== Second Empire ==
- 14 December 1852 – 23 November 1860 : Achille Fould
- 4 December 1860 – 10 August 1870 : Jean-Baptiste Philibert Vaillant
