= Henri-Auguste de Loménie, comte de Brienne =

French politician

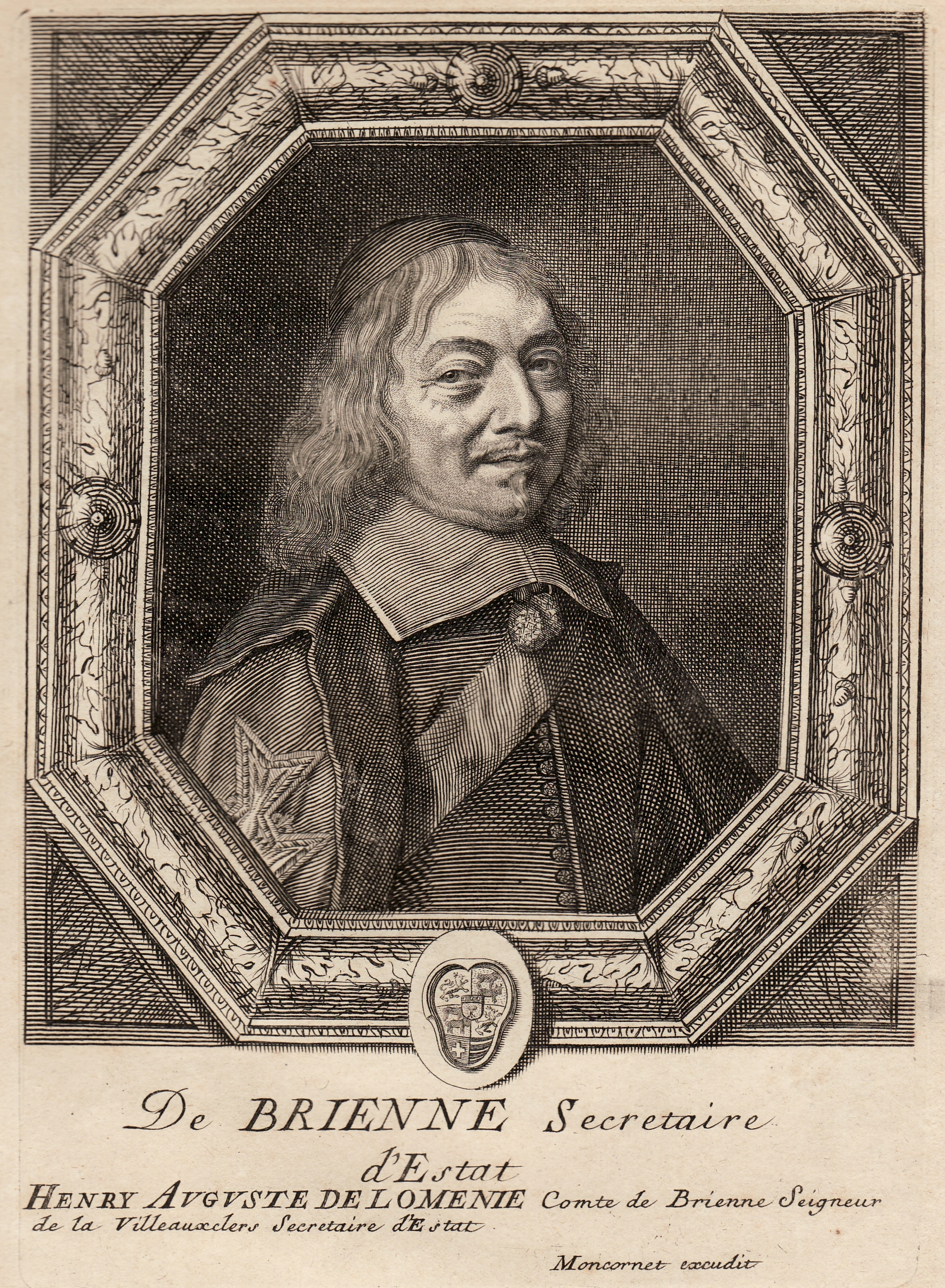
Henri-Auguste de Loménie de Brienne

Henri-Auguste de Loménie (1594 – 3 November 1666), Count of Brienne, Seigneur de La Ville-aux-Clercs was a French politician. He was secretary of state for the navy from 1615 to February 1643, and then secretary of state for foreign affairs from 1643 to 1663 under Mazarin during the minority of Louis XIV. From the Loménie family (originating in Flavignac in Limousin), he was the son of Antoine de Loménie, secretary of state to Henry IV and a Huguenot convert.

The Count de Brienne was naturally destined to public office. He traveled to Germany, Poland and Italy, by order of his father, the last as well prepare for his career. He was back in Paris towards the end of 1609, that he was noticed by Henry IV, who allowed him to attend the board sometimes. Marie de Medici, regent of France, commissioned him in 1614 to negotiate with some members of the États généraux, "whose minds were unwell", and his clever response obtained from them the nomination of a president acceptable to the court. This success earned him in 1617, master of ceremonies and provost of king's orders. Until the death of his father, his principal occupation "was to accompany the King and gain the honor of his good graces, to which he succeeds."

The British Embassy, where he was responsible for negotiating the marriage of Henrietta Maria of France with the Charles I of England. However, when he seemed to have met with success in its attempt at accommodatation, he was disowned by Louis XIII and Richelieu. The kindness of the queen mother of Louis XI to him was also the affection of the princess to Madame de Brienne, his wife, whom the whole court knew to be the closest confidante of Anne of Austria. This influence kept him in power until the death of Mazarin, but before that time, his influence began to wane.

The impairment of the Count of Brienne was not soon enough for the young and voluntary authority of Louis XIV; high diplomatic capacities should preferably also attract the attention of the king, a great kingdom was coming, and he had to carry and moderate both the ideas of the gigantic new prince, physical strength and moral well above that of the Count de Brienne. Hugues de Lyonne was charged in 1663, with the Department of Foreign Affairs, replacing him. He died in 1666.

He wrote his memoirs for the instruction of her children: Memory containing the most remarkable events of the reign of Louis XIII and Louis XIV than to the death of Cardinal Mazarin.

== Descendants ==
By a contract of 7 February 1623, he married Louise de Béon (1602–1665), who brought him the title of Count of Brienne. They had seven children:

- Marie-Antoinette (c. 1624 – 8 December 1704), married 4 June 1642 to Nicolas-Joachim, Marquis de Rouault de Gamaches (born 1621, died at Beauchamps on 22 October 1687)
- Louis-Henri de Loménie de Brienne (born 13 January 1636, died at Château-Landon 17 April 1698), became Secrétaire d'État des Affaires Ètrangères, succeeding his father from 24 August 1651 to 14 April 1663, Conseiller d’État on 12 September 1651, retired at Les Pères de l’Oratoire from 24 January 1664 to 12 June 1670, committed by a lettre de cachet to an insane asylum, the Abbey of Saint-Lazare, from 27 January 1674 to 1692
- Charles-François (born 1638, died 7 April 1720), Abbot of in Picardie from 1653 to 1720, Abbot of Saint-Germain d'Auxerre, and of Saint-Cyprien de Poitiers, received as docteur in the Sorbonne on 8 March 1665, appointed Bishop of Coutances by the king on 5 December 1666 and confirmed by papal bull of 12 December 1667, consecrated by François de Harlay de Champvallon, Archbishop of Rouen, in the church of the Carmelite nuns at Saint-Denis on 19 February 1668, took possession of his diocese on 28 October 1668
- Alexandre-Bernard (born c. 1640, died 1673), joined the Order of Knights of the Hospital of Saint John of Jerusalem at the age of 5 on 16 June 1645, named Consul of Cairo and Alexandria by lettres patentes on 30 November 1647 and on 21 February 1656
- Jeanne, died young
- Madeleine, died young

== Footnotes ==
Political offices
Preceded by Henri Auguste de Loménie	Minister for the Maison du Roi; 1615–1643	Succeeded by Henry de Guénegaud
Preceded by Henri Auguste de Loménie	Minister of the Navy and the Colonies; 1643–1662	Succeeded by Henry de Guénegaud
Preceded by Léon Bouthillier, comte de Chavigny	Foreign Minister of France; 23 June 1643 – 3 April 1663	Succeeded by Hugues de Lionne
