= Agathon Jean François Fain =

French historian (1778–1837)

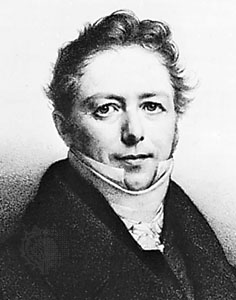
Agathon Jean François Fain

Agathon Jean François Fain (January 11, 1778 – September 16, 1837) was a French historian.

He was born in Paris, France. Having gained admittance to the offices of the Directory, he became head of a département. Under the French Consulate he entered the office of the secretary of state, in the department of the archives. In 1806 he was appointed secretary and archivist to the cabinet particulier of the emperor, whom he attended on his campaigns and journeys. He was created a baron of the empire in 1809, and, on the fall of Napoleon, was first secretary of the cabinet and confidential secretary.

Compelled by the second Restoration to retire into private life, he devoted his leisure to writing the history of his times, an occupation for which his previous employments well fitted him. He published successively Manuscrit de l'an 1814, contenant l'histoire des six derniers mois du régime de Napoléon (1823; new edition with illustrations, 1906); Manuscrit de l'an 1814, trouvé dans les voitures impériales prises à Waterloo (Paris 1823); Manuscrit de l'an 1813, contenant le précis des évènements de cette année pour servir à l'histoire de l'empereur Napoléon (1824); Manuscrit de l'an 1812 (1827); and Manuscrit de l'an trois (1794–1795), contenant les premières transactions des puissances de l'Europe avec la république française, et le tableau des derniers événemens du régime conventionnel (1828), all of which are remarkable for accuracy and wide range of knowledge, and are a very valuable source for the history of Napoleon.

Of still greater importance for the history of Napoleon are Fain's Mémoires du Baron Fain, Premier Secrétaire du Cabinet de l'Empereur, which were published posthumously in 1908; they relate more particularly to the last five years of the empire, and give a detailed picture of the emperor at work on his correspondence among his confidential secretaries. The first English edition, Napoleon: How He Did It - The Memoirs of Baron Fain, First Secretary of the Emperor's Cabinet, was published in 1998.

Immediately after the overthrow of Charles X, King Louis Philippe appointed Fain first secretary of his cabinet (August 1830). Fain was a member of the council of state and deputy from Montargis from 1834 until his death, which occurred in Paris on the 16 September 1837.
