= Eugène Claudius-Petit =

French politician

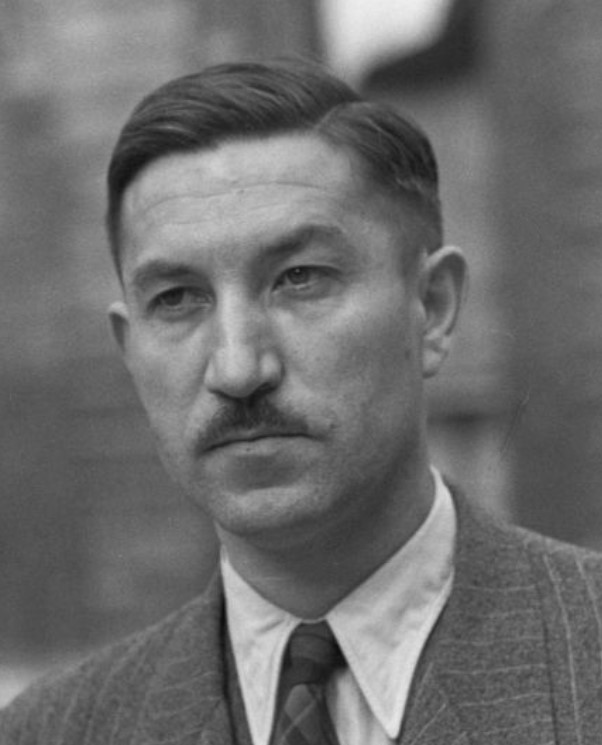

Deputy to the National Assembly from Paris's 15th constituency
- In office 3 April 1973 – 2 April 1978
- Preceded by: Michel de Grailly
- Succeeded by: Yves Lancien

Personal details
- Born: 22 May 1907 Angers, Maine-et-Loire
- Died: 24 October 1989 (aged 82) Paris
- Party: Democratic and Socialist Union of the Resistance, Centre, Democracy and Progress

Eugène Claudius-Petit (1907–1989) was a French politician. He participated in many governments under the Fourth Republic and was a proponent of Firminy Vert. He later added his pseudonym from the Resistance, "Claudius", to his name.

== Early life and career ==
He was born on 11 May 1907 in Angers, and died on 24 October 1989 in Paris.

The son of a railway worker, he attended primary school in his hometown and then became an apprentice and made his tour of France as a journeyman. He worked for a cabinetmaker in Paris and then joined the Rambault Furniture Company in Angers. He took courses in the hopes of becoming an art teacher. He later became anarchist in his political views and campaigned briefly in the libertarian movement. He also hosted a local union CGTU then joined after a meeting with Marc Sangnier.

He joined the French Resistance under the name Claudius. In 1942, he was part of the executive committee of Free Marksman in which Peter Degon later joined. In 1943 he became a founding member of the CNR where he represented the MUR (United Movements of Resistance). He left France for London and Algiers, where he was a delegate to the Provisional Consultative Assembly. After moving back to Paris, he chaired the National Liberation Movement.

He became a Companion of the Liberation, and was awarded the Croix de Guerre and the Legion of Honor.

== Political career ==
Claudius-Petit was elected as Member of the Loire to the first and second National Constituent Assembly and the National Assembly from 1946 to 1955 under the Democratic and Socialist Union of the Resistance (UDSR) party.

During the Fourth and the Fifth Republic, Claudius-Petit, who believed that politics was a struggle for "those who have nothing," became one of the central figures of modernist and social centrism. Appointed Minister of Reconstruction and Urbanism on 11 September 1948, he led a broad policy and planning team in France after the war that repaired the damage of the conflict and dealt with housing shortages without precedent.

In February 1950, he appeared before the Council of Ministers to publish a pamphlet for national land use which is considered the founding manifesto of the policy conducted during the next half-century. To combat the excessive inequalities of settlement and activity, while balancing housing to industrial needs, Claudius-Petit advocated for a significant commitment in investment and regulation.

He was then Minister of Labour and Social Security from 19 June to 3 September 1954 under the government of Pierre Mendès France before becoming the interim Minister of Housing from 14 August to 3 September 1954. He resigned after the rejection of the EDC.

In the Ministry of Housing, he filed bills related to the acquisition of residential and industrial equipment, the procedure for codification of legislative texts concerning town planning and housing. He fought against slums.

Defeated in the 1956 election, he found his seat in the National Assembly from 1958 to 1962 and from 1967 to 1978 under various centrist roles.

From its inception in 1956 to 1977, he directed Sonacotra, the National Society for construction workers (Sonacotral, National Society of Algerian workers to build up the Evian agreements of 1962) Senior Manager of migrant workers' hostels in France.

He was a practicing Catholic, a fact reflected by his speech on the final day of the debate on the legalization of abortion in France, on 19 December 1974: "In conclusion, and precisely because I did not let my spiritual beliefs at the door, I can not get rid of the solidarity that binds me to the society in which I live. To obey my demands, I am with those who suffer most, with those convicted as with those who are despised the most (...) Because of that, because of Him, I take my share of burden. I will fight against everything that leads to abortion, but I will vote for the law".

== Firminy-Vert ==
As a friend of Le Corbusier, he embarked on a massive renovation of the town of Firminy. Elected mayor in 1953, he dreamed of building next to the city, "a city of the twentieth century to the best of his time," a kind of small Brasília, a compendium of modern architecture. In 1955, he governed several buildings by Le Corbusier, including a house of Culture, a "radiant city", a stage and the Church of St. Peter.

== Honors ==
- Commander of the Legion of Honor
- Companion of the Liberation - Decree of 19 October 1945
- Croix de Guerre 1939-1945 (2 citations)
- Médaille de la Résistance with Rosette
- Commander of Mérite Social
- Commander of the Rose blanche de Finlande
- Grand Officer of Ouissam Alaouite

== Tributes ==
- A dead-end road at Saint-Étienne, bears his name.
- An avenue at Bourges bears his name.
- A street in Angers is named after him.
- A district in the 14th arrondissement of Paris bears his name: Place Eugène Claudius-Petit
- His "attic" (chalet in Courchevel) called "The Pin" became a historical monument since 23 January 2006

== See also ==
- Eugène Pons

== Bibliography ==
- « Pour un plan national d'aménagement du territoire », Les grands textes de l'aménagement du territoire et de la décentralisation. Christel Alvergne, Pierre Musso, DATAR (Avant-propos de Jean-Pierre Raffarin, Premier ministre), 2004, ISBN 2110052392
- Benoît Pouvreau, Danièle Voldman, Un politique en architecture : Eugène Claudius-Petit (1907-1989), préf. de Dominique Claudius-Petit, éd. Le Moniteur, coll. « Architextes », 2004, 358 p., (ISBN 2281192237)
- Pouvreau Benedict, ""La politique d'aménagement du territoire d'Eugène Claudius-Petit" in XX (magazine), No. 79 -2003 / 3, p. 43-52
- "Hommage à Eugène Claudius-Petit, fondateur du corps des architectes-conseils de l'État", Thotm, 2007, 36 p. link
- Biography on the website of the Order of the Liberation
- Biography at the National Assembly
