= Prison conditions in France =

Condition of prisons in France

A prison is a place where people condemned to a custodial sentence or awaiting their trial are held against their will. Prisons are also used to try to reintegrate inmates into society in order to prevent recidivism. French prisons are overflowing and the penitentiary personnel is understaffed. In 2003 the European Committee for the Prevention of Torture (CPT), an organ of the Council of Europe, reported "inhumane and degrading treatment" in French prisons.

== The French prison system ==
The types of prisons depend on the type of criminals they hold.

Firstly, there are the short-stay prisons. Short-stay prisons contain the defendants awaiting their trial, and prisoners sentenced to less than 2 years. These are the most overcrowded prisons in the French penitentiary system, with an average rate of occupancy of 130%.

There are various prisons for sentenced prisoners:

- The detention centre (Maison d'arrêt): these are for individuals showing a genuine desire for social reintegration. These include Europe's largest prison, the Maison d'arrêt de Fleury Mérogis.
- The central prison (Maison centrale): these are for the most dangerous individuals, and have a very rigorous detention system. Prominent Maisons Centrales include Clairvaux Prison.
- The penitentiary centre (centre pénitencier): these are made up of differentiated neighbourhoods with more or less rigorous systems, for example, a centre can host a "central" area as well as a detention centre.
- The semi-custodial centre (centre de semi-liberté): these are for individuals having an adjustment of their sentences, with possible exits according to the schedule set by the judge.
- The juvenile centre (centre pour mineurs): these are for prisoners under the adult age, the number of inmates is reduced (to close to 60 in each institution) to ensure a better education and promote social inclusion.
- The national public health centre of Fresnes (L’établissement public de santé national de Fresnes) for the non-emergency and non-psychiatric inmates' hospitalization.

== Criticism ==
In 2009, the Nantes Administrative Court condemned the State for injury to three inmates because of outrageous detention conditions. An expert appointed by the court of Nantes had indeed found several problems in detention conditions: for example, prisoners were 7 people to a 30 m^{2} cell, without separated toilets. The French courts are not the only ones to condemn the state: The European Court of Human Rights did so repeatedly, in 2013 with the case Enzo Canali and in 2015 for the treatment conditions of a disabled prisoner, who was judged in opposition with the European Convention on Human Rights. Also, many reports list the problems that the French prison systems are facing.

=== Overcrowding ===
	Standard capacities	Operational capacities	Number of inmate	Density (%)
Metropole	54,838	54,070	62,513	115.6
Overseas	3,836	3,784	4,592	121.4
All penitentiary establishments	58,674	57,854	67,105	116.0

'number of the 1 december 2014

French prisons have reached an average rate of occupancy of 116.6%. Overcrowding is mainly present in short-stay prisons, where they hold both sentenced people and people awaiting trial. During these visits in French prisons in 2005, the Council of Europe Commissioner for Human Rights, Álvaro Gil-Robles, denounced the overcrowding.

«This is especially true for the short-stay prisons where the inmate population is not limited to a quota, as that is not the case in the penalties institutions. In most places visited, the oldest such as the prison of Health, the most recent, such as Pontet prison, the number of inmates exceeded the originally planned number of places for these institutions. »

This is particularly due to the fact that short-stay prisons are not subject to the rule of individual cells, which is the Numerus clausus. The short-stay prisons although they are overwhelmed by the number of occupants, must continue to welcome new convicts. The rule «a place for a convict» no longer exists. In addition, the prison map is no longer suited to the geographical realities of crime, as there is a lack of institutions in large cities (Lille, Lyon, Nice, Toulouse) and outer suburbs of the Paris area (Meaux, Orleans, Le Mans ...).

But this congestion, as denounced by Louis Mermaz and Jacques Floch in the report of the parliament investigation commission in 2000, is also due to the fact that the penitentiary centres scrupulously respect this numerus clausus rule. Thus, out of 33,141 people sentenced on 1 January 2000, 9,497 of them are held in short stay prisons pending a place in a penitentiary centres. Moreover, this overcrowding has grown since 2002, with an increase of immediate trials increasing the number of suspects under short-stay prison, and with an increase of penalties for a short duration (between 1 and 3 years).

A strengthening of the penal policies has been observed in France under the mandate of the Minister of Justice Rachida Dati, allowed for an increase of penalties for certain offenses and a more frequent use of confinement.

The solution then was to build new prison facilities to de-bottleneck the short-stay prisons. In 2002, the «13 000 program» was launched to create new reception centres in regions which suffer from a shortage of places. This program was supposed to be completed in 2011, but the 2008 financial crisis has significantly reduced the construction.

=== Health ===
Since Law No. 94-43 of 18 January 1994 (Chapter II : Health in prison and Social Welfare of Prisoners), prisoners are affiliated to the general social security scheme during their incarceration. However, in its 2006 report, the CPT was concerned about the health conditions of the individuals incarcerated, especially after a visit at Moulin hospital, where the permanent presence of police deprives patients of "the most basic right of confidentiality and privacy". Medical staff cannot provide care "respecting human dignity." "Medical treatment is degrading and became perverted." Moreover, inmates with acute mental suffering are placed in solitary confinement or punishment sectors because it is almost impossible to obtain emergency hospitalization as the penitential hospitals are overwhelmed. For the CPT, they must "review entirely" the conditions of psychiatric care for the most watched prisoners, who usually have their feet shackled and hands cuffed to the bed during hospitalization. More generally, the CPT emphasizes that the nursing employees are understaffed and that there is «a lack of coordination» between general medicine and psychiatry in prisons.

==== Prevalence of HIV/AIDS ====
The presence of HIV/AIDS, as in many prisons, is seven times above normal. This is due to the presence of many injecting drug users, but also because of unprotected sexual relations. Sexual relations are forbidden in prison in public areas (dorm, parlor, walk...). However, condoms are freely available, since as the cells are considered as a home, sexuality is allowed in them.

==== Mental health of prisoners ====
According to the report of Jean-Louis Terra, Suicide Prevention of the Prisoners, released in December 2003, 55% of inmates entering prison had a mental disorder. 30% of men and 45% of women are affected by depression. One in five inmates were under the care of a physician before their incarceration. Moreover, mental suffering and depression increases the number of self-mutilations and suicides. In 2008, there were over 80 suicides among prisoners.

In 2006, a study was conducted on 800 randomly selected prisoners in relation to mental illness in French correctional facilities. The researchers concluded that 6.2% had some form of schizophrenia, 24% had some form of major depressive disorder, 17.7% had generalized anxiety, and 14.6% suffered from drug dependence and withdrawal. Mental health in prisons around the world is often overlooked. Prisoner's outbursts can be directly linked to an undiagnosed mental illness. Though mental illness may be the cause, prison officials often turn to administrative segregation and physical violence as a solution instead of treatment.

François Moreau, department head and president of the Union of doctors working in prisons in 2000, listed the difficulties of medical work in prisons in "The prison universe".

"[The prisoner] involves his own health and his body through self-mutilation to protest against a measure of justice or an internal measure, to obtain for example a cell change. He will also try to obtain medicines, especially if he is a drug addict. (...) It is always very difficult to distinguish the real need of the patient and the masked need for secondary benefits. We are also faced with inmates who refuse care, who refuse to take their treatment or endangering their health through hunger strikes. This denial of care to win the case towards another claim is very particular prisons."

=== The "canteen" ===
In prisons, inmates have the opportunity to buy food in canteens or other products such as tobacco, clothing or newspapers. However, in their 2000 report on the detention conditions in French prisons, Jean-Jacques Hyest and Guy-Pierre Cabanel were concerned to see that these canteens generate strong inequalities between inmates, introducing power relations and promoting the development of racketeering. The rich inmate "will establish dominance over the poorer, which depends on him to get a cigarette, a stamp or a television." Furthermore, in its report of January 2006 the Revenue Court was concerned about the lack of regulations there were in the organization of canteens, and alarmed by the cost of living in prisons. The prices of products are fixed by the Warden. The Revenue Court therefore underlines the importance for those prices to be fixed in order to be as accessible as possible for prisoners, absolutely not in order to make the greatest commercial profit.

=== Work done by prisoners ===
The Article D101, paragraph 2 of the Criminal Procedure Code defines the mission of prisons on work: "Wherever possible, the work of each prisoner is chosen according not only on his physical and intellectual abilities, but also on the influence that this work can have on the prospects for his reintegration. It is also determinate according to his family situation and the existence of civil parties to compensate." In reality the number of jobs is insufficient, and many inmates find themselves in forced inactivity. They are in a precarious situation which prevents them from carrying out compensation for civil parties and to commit themselves in an active rehabilitation approach. Moreover, the salary of an individual is much lower in detention: the minimum wage in short-stay prison represents 40.9% of the general minimum wage and 44.2% in penitentiary centre.

=== Separation from family members ===
The allocation in a prison depends on the place of judgement; the judge may request removal of the accused during the investigation. This bind mode leads some inmates to be widely held away from their families, including those arrested overseas. There is often severe trauma due to isolation among women inmates with children. In addition, prisoners serving long sentences may suffer long periods of isolation from their families. It is often assumed that one cannot see their family in a face to face visitation area for up to twenty years. Furthermore, in their report Jean-Jacques Hyest and Guy-Pierre Cabanel are worried about the condition of visiting rooms: those are dark places that are often not cleaned, or with an inconvenient access. "At the prison of Nanterre, management had to install a small clinic that allows people to rest: the darkness and the oppressiveness of the corridors to reach the parlours regularly cause discomfort among visitors».

Álvaro Gil-Robles, the Council of Europe Commissioner for Human Rights, in his report on the effective respect for human rights in France, was concerned about the lack of "family units" built in France. Those are spaces for inmates serving long sentences and not enjoying furloughs. It is built in the prison enclosure, and is unsupervised. It allows the family to live all the dimensions of real family life for a while. This meeting system with the family has begun to be widespread in Europe; France is lagging behind on this.

== See also ==
- A Prophet, a 2009 movie about the French prison system
- Arenc affair
