= La Marseillaise (newspaper) =

French regional daily newspaper

- Type: Daily newspaper
- Founded: 1943; 82 years ago
- Language: French
- Headquarters: 15 Cours d'Estienne d'Orves; 1st arrondissement of Marseille, France
- ISSN: 2131-8387
- Website: Official website

La Marseillaise (French: [la maʁsɛˈjɛːz]) is a French regional daily newspaper established in 1943 and published in Marseille. Its editorial line has been described as being on the left of the political spectrum.
