= Gedde's maps of Copenhagen =

18th century maps

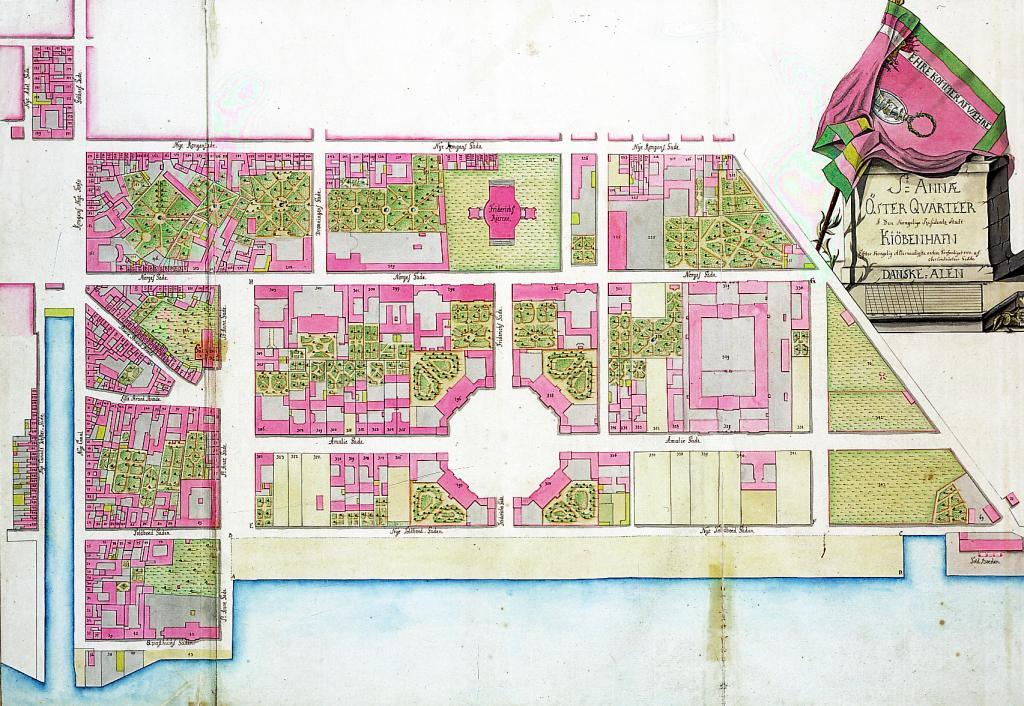
Frederiksstaden seen on Gedde's map of Sankt Annæ Øster Kvarter

Gedde's maps of Copenhagen refers to a set of maps created by Christian Gedde in the 1750s, consisting of 12 sectional maps showing the official districts of Copenhagen, Denmark, as well as a general bird's-eye view map in isometric perspective toward the southwest showing the whole city.

The original title of the work was Charta over den kongelige Residencestad Kiöbenhavn med dens omkringliggende Egne (transl. Map of the Royal Residence City Copenhagen and its surrounding Areas). It is an important source of information about mid-18th-century Copenhagen. A printed version was first published in 2002 and Copenhagen City Archives launched a website with a digitalized version in 2011.

== History ==
One-third of Copenhagen was destroyed in the Great Fire of 1728. In the 1740s, Sibrandt led the work with production of new local maps which registered land use and ownership. They were used for taxation purposes and organization of local militias, which played an important role in the defense of the city.

In the 1750s, Frederick V decided to publish a comprehensive map of Copenhagen. Copenhagen's Magistracy was put in charge of the project and called on the services of Samuel Christoph Gedde, head of the engineering corps (Danish: Fortifikationsetaten).

Samuel Christoph Gedde assigned the task to his son, Christian Gedde, who was an officer in the engineering troops. He embarked upon the work in 1757 and had completed his updates of the 12 district maps by late 1758.

The district maps formed the basis for the overview map which according to specific orders from the King was to be in the same style as Louis Bretez's Turgot map of Paris which had been published in 1739. One of the map's intentions was to show that Copenhagen had risen from the ashes after the Fire of 1728 and to promote the city as an important regional centre, worthy of the absolute monarch. Christian Gedde completed the elevated map in 1761. From 1771, it hung in City Hall on Gammeltorv. It was rescued from the flames during the Copenhagen Fire of 1795 and later moved to the new city hall on Nytorv. It is now kept in the Copenhagen City Archives.

== Publication ==
The General map was not intended for publication at the time since it depicted Copenhagen's fortifications in detail and thus knowledge information that could be exploited by a possible enemy. The intention was to publish an edited version, cleansed of military sensitive details, but this version was never produced.

The Bergia Foundation published the first printed version of the map in 2002. In 2011, Copenhagen City Archives launched a website with a digitalized version of Gedde's maps to mark the 250 years anniversary of his elevated map of Copenhagen. The digital map had been produced in connection with the Bergia Foundation's 2002 publication.

== Description ==
=== General map ===
The general map measures 2.5 times 2.5 metres and at a scale of approximately 1:2,600 covers an area of approximately 50 square kilometres. It shows Copenhagen from the south-southeast. The map was originally in red, green, blue and yellow. The colours have disappeared over time but traces of them remain.

=== District maps ===
- Sankt Annæ Øster
- Sankt Annæ Vester

=== Christianshavn Quarter ===
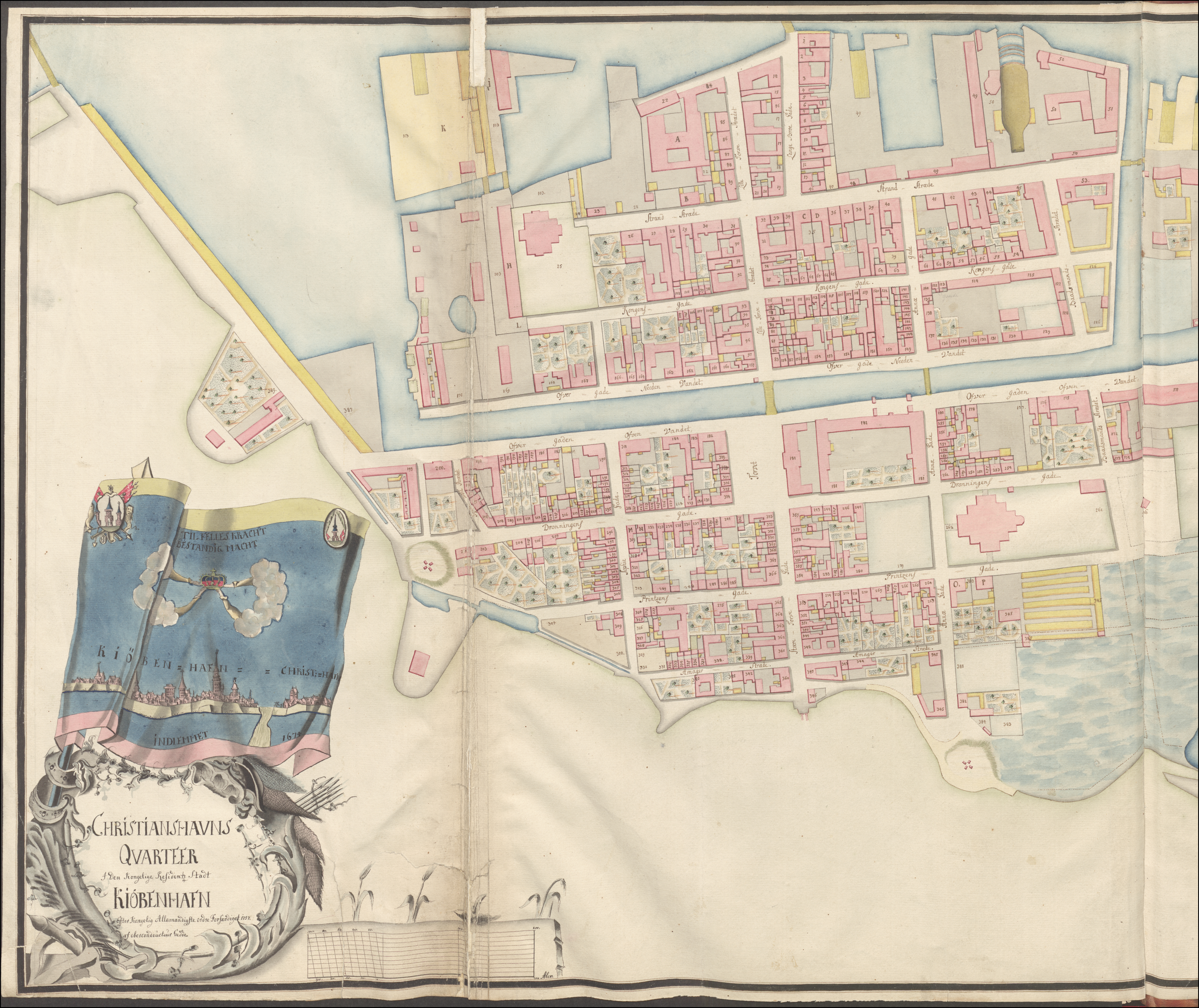
Christianshavn Quarter
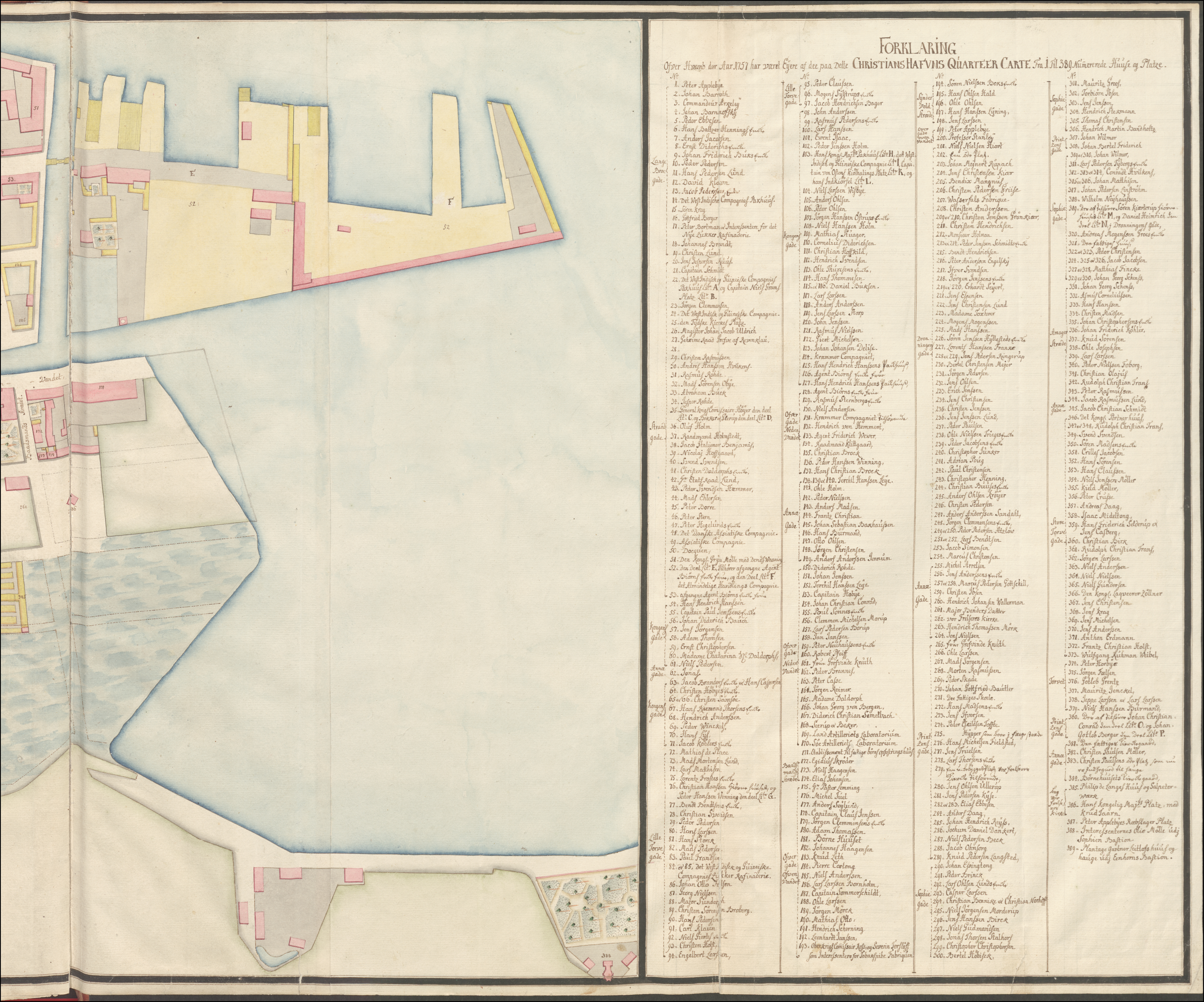
Christianshavn Quarter

=== East Quarter ===
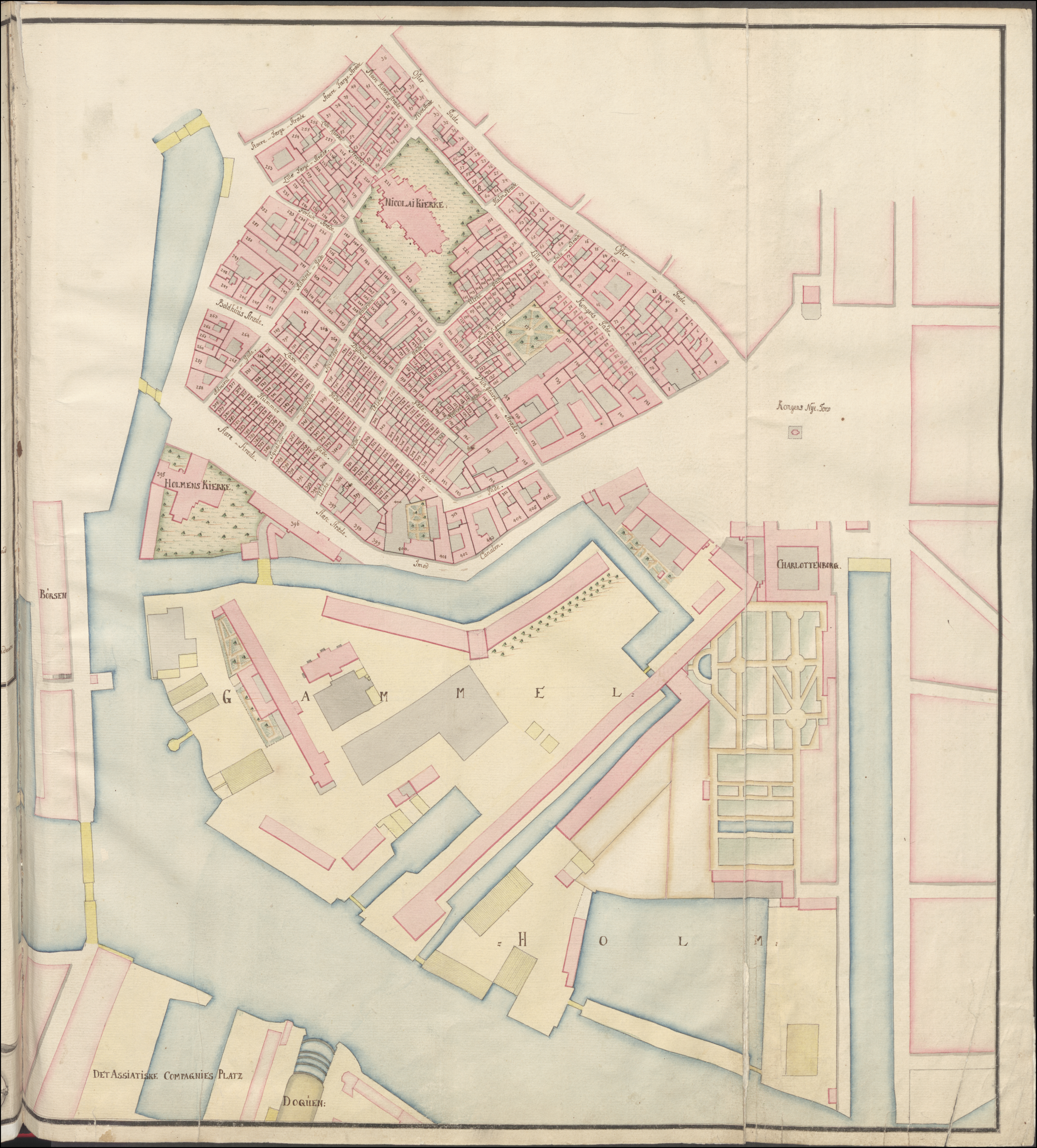
East Quarter
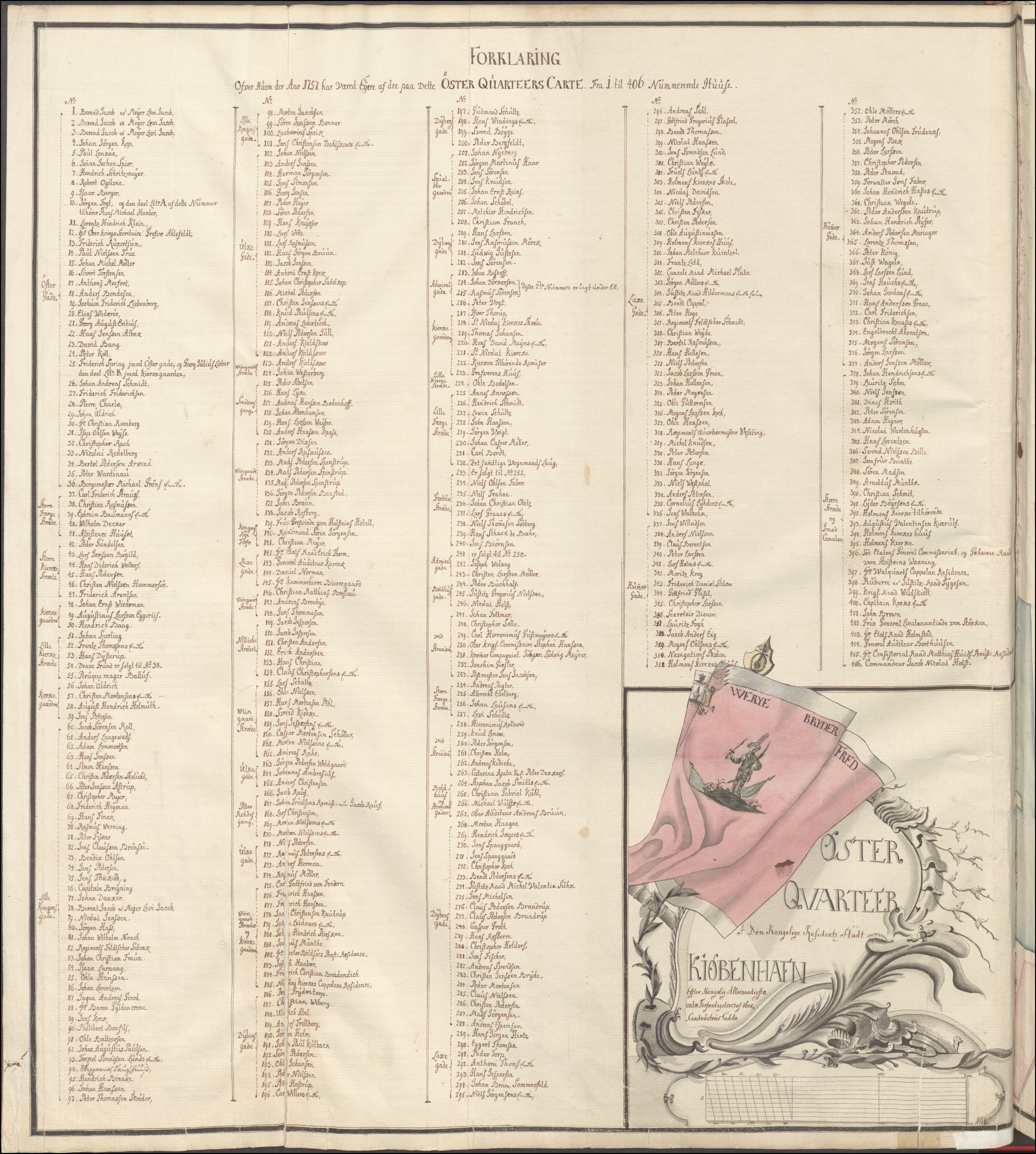
East Quarter

=== Frimand's Quarter ===
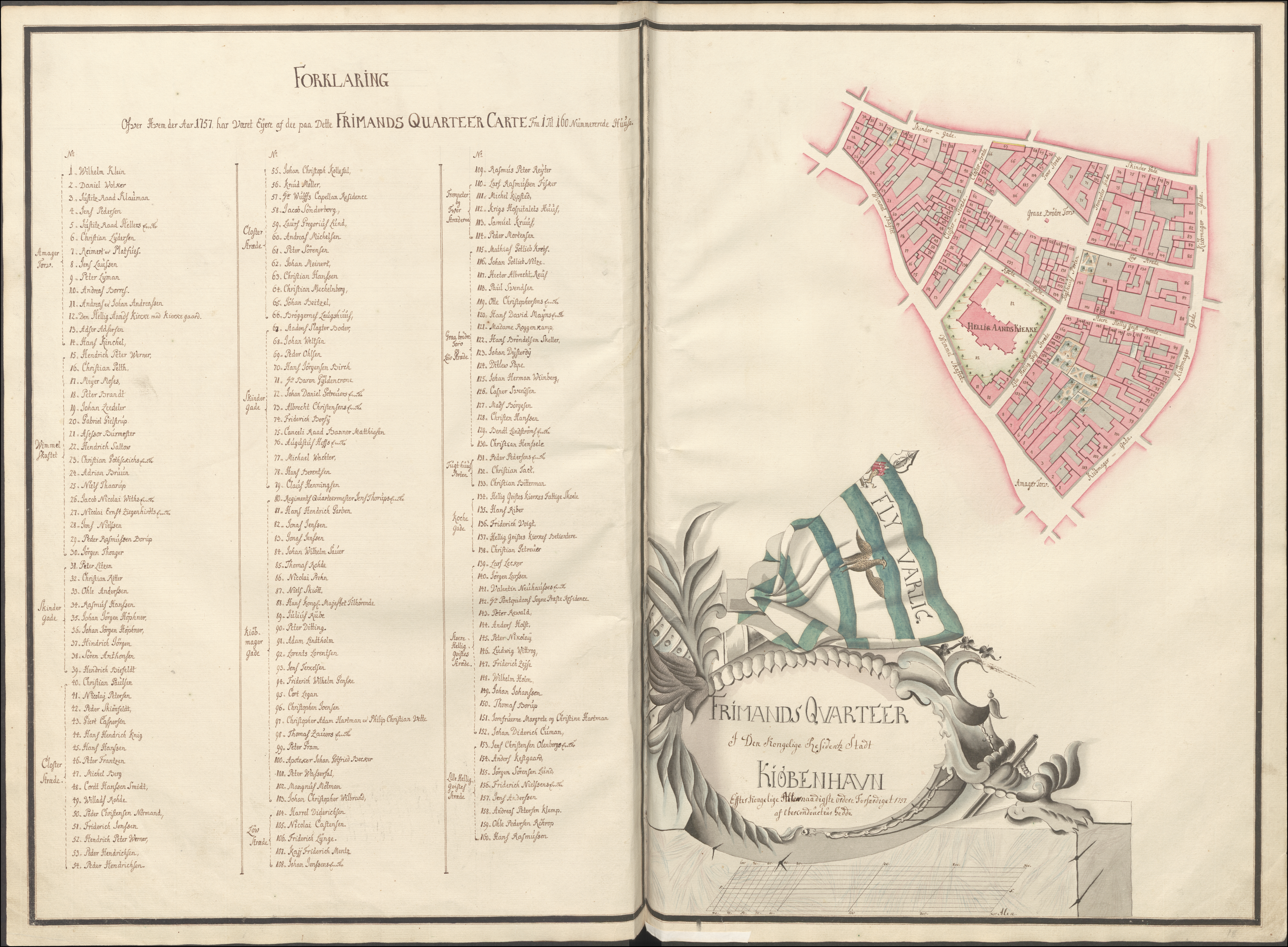
Frimand's Quarter

=== Klædebo Quarter ===
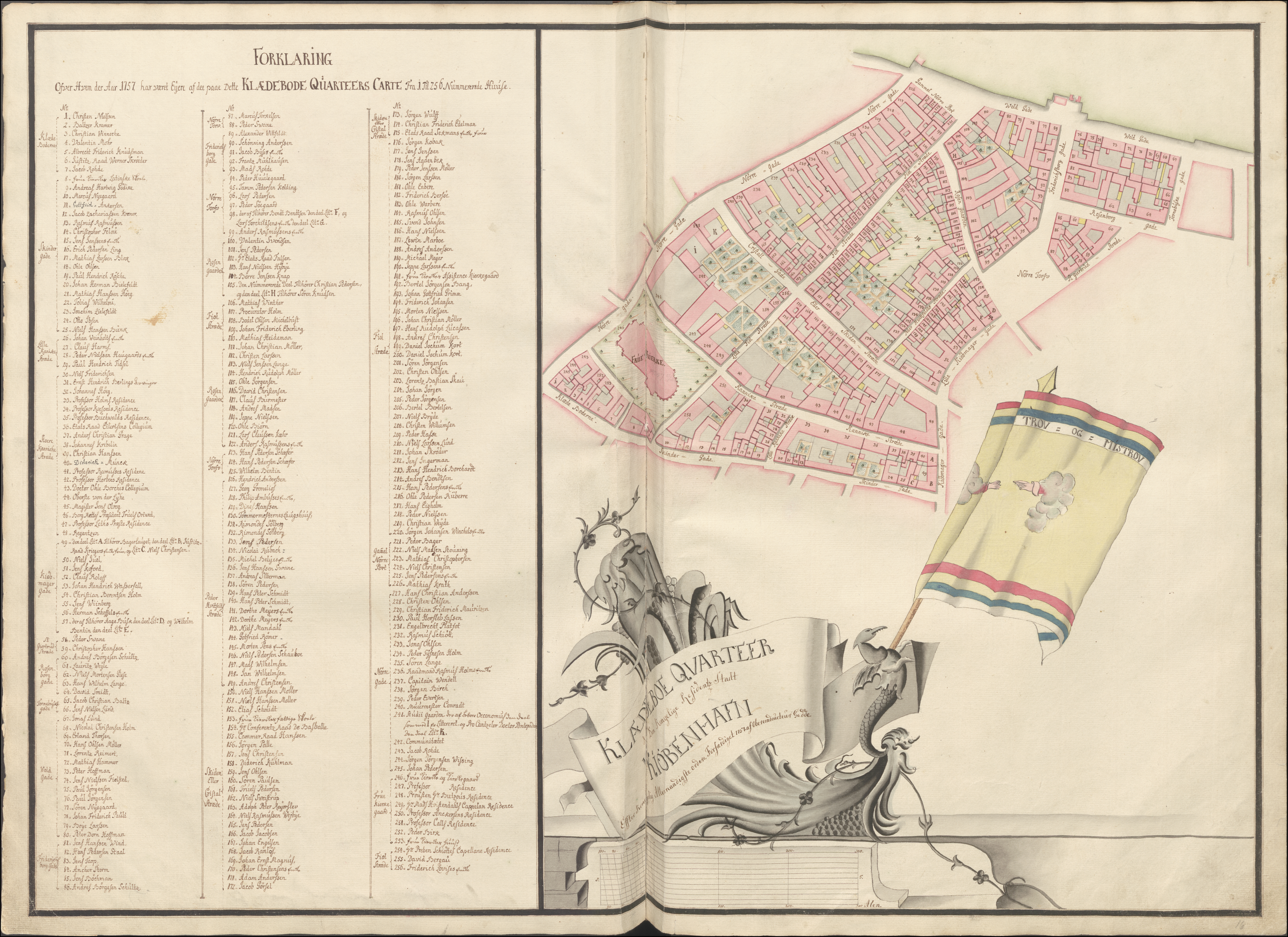
Klædebo Quarter

=== Købmager Quarter ===
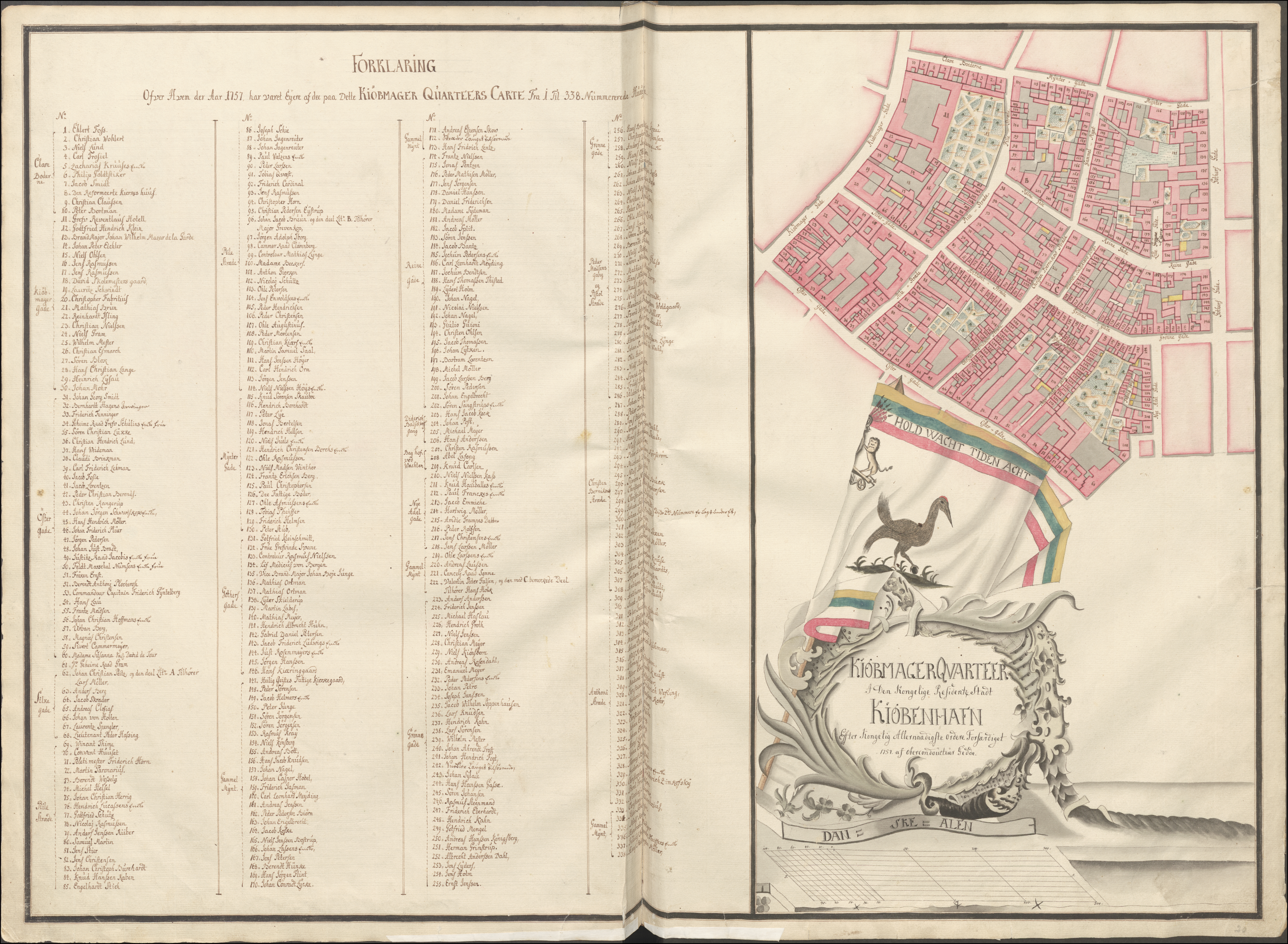
Købmager Quarter

=== North Quarter ===
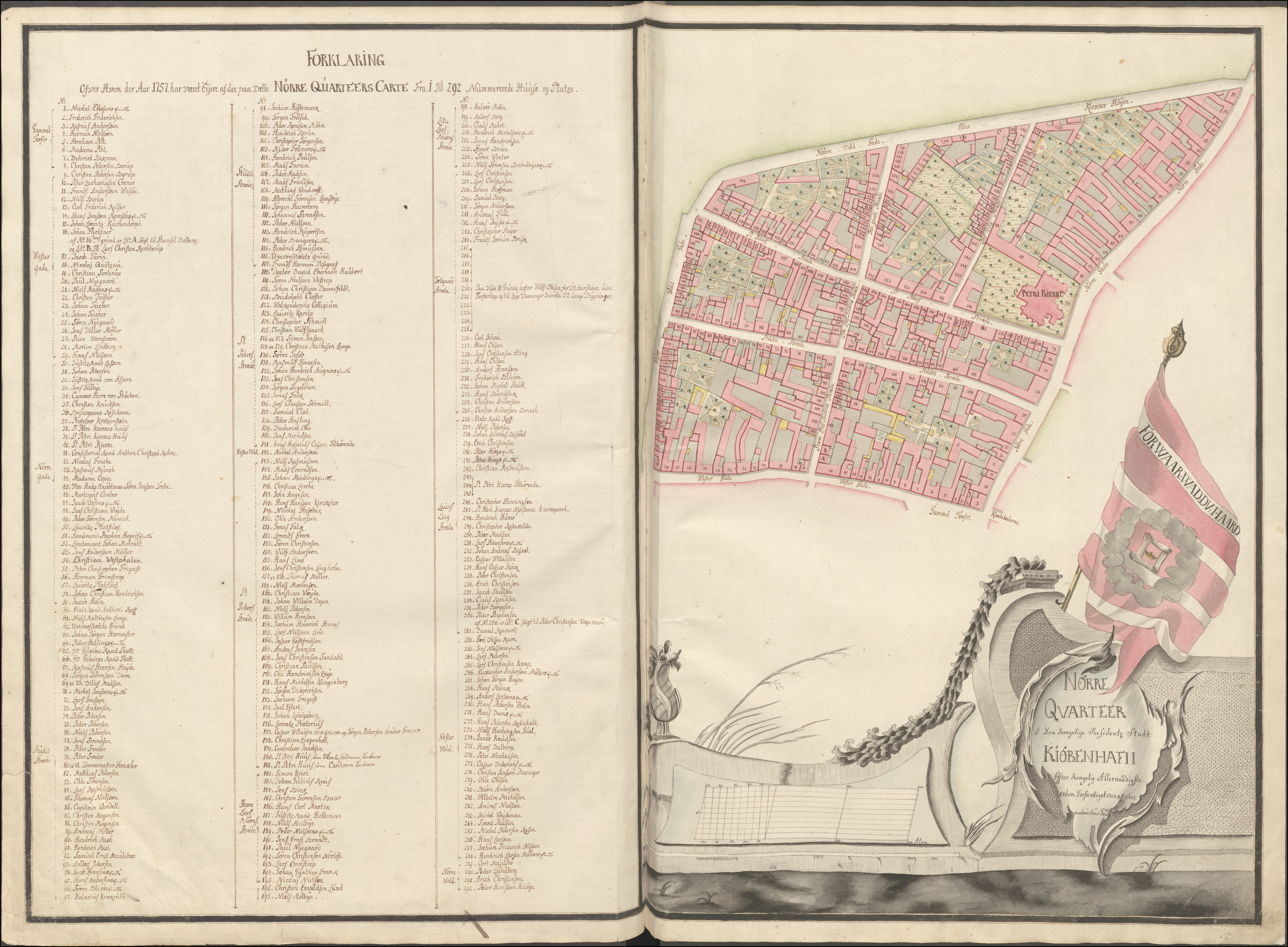
North Quarter

=== Rosenborg Quarter ===
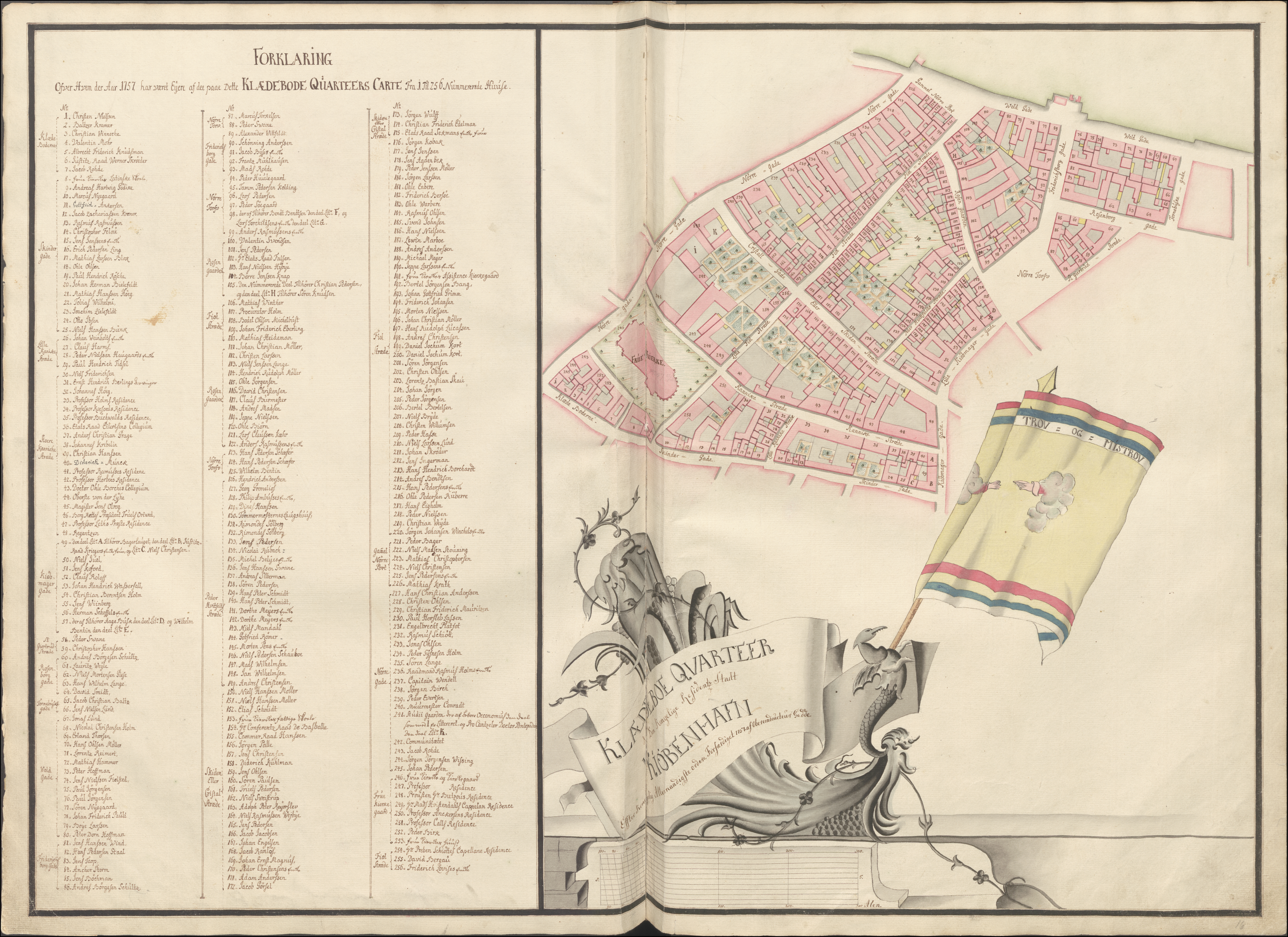
Rosenborg Quarter

=== St. Ann's East Quarter ===
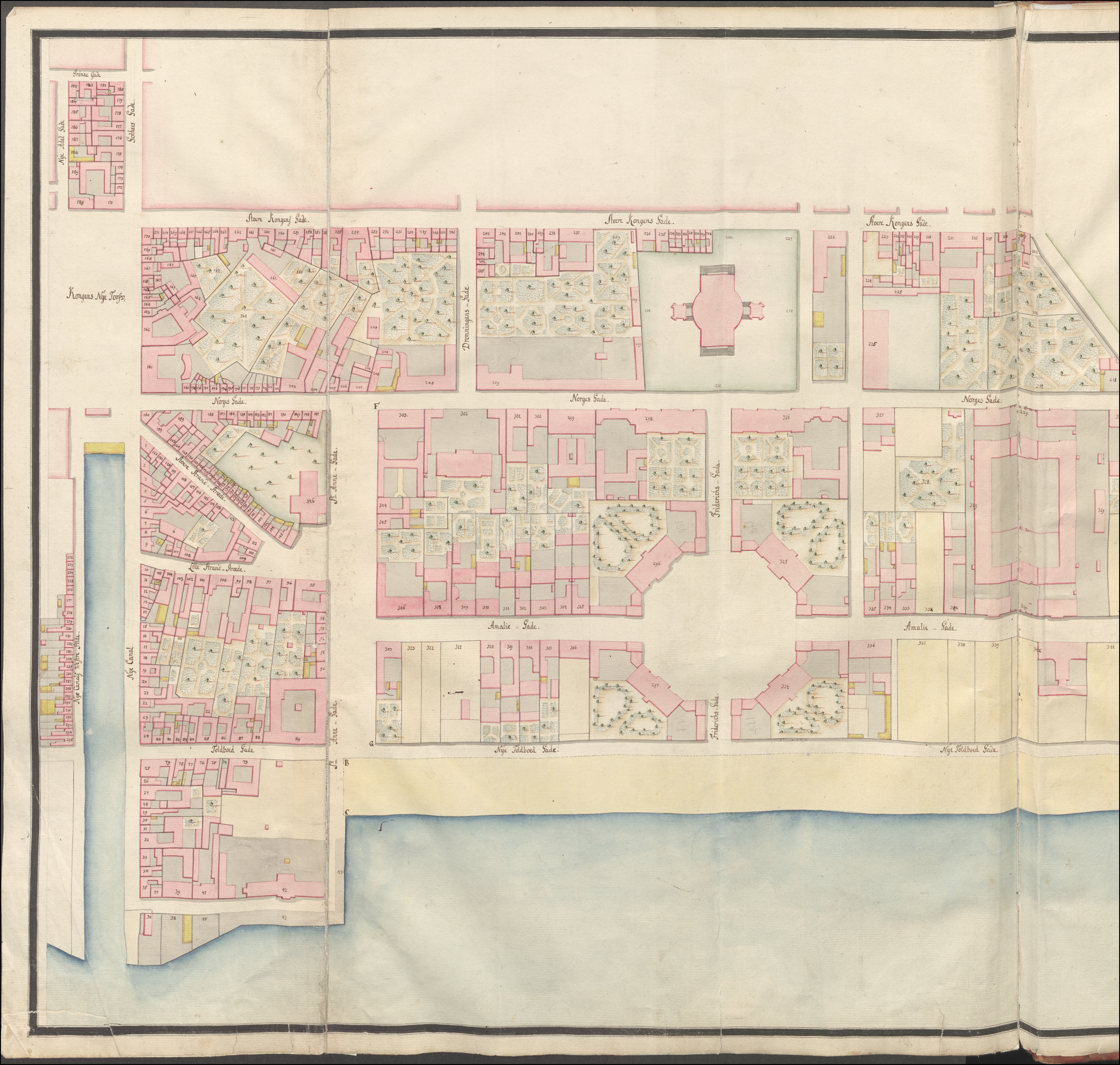
St. Ann's East Quarter
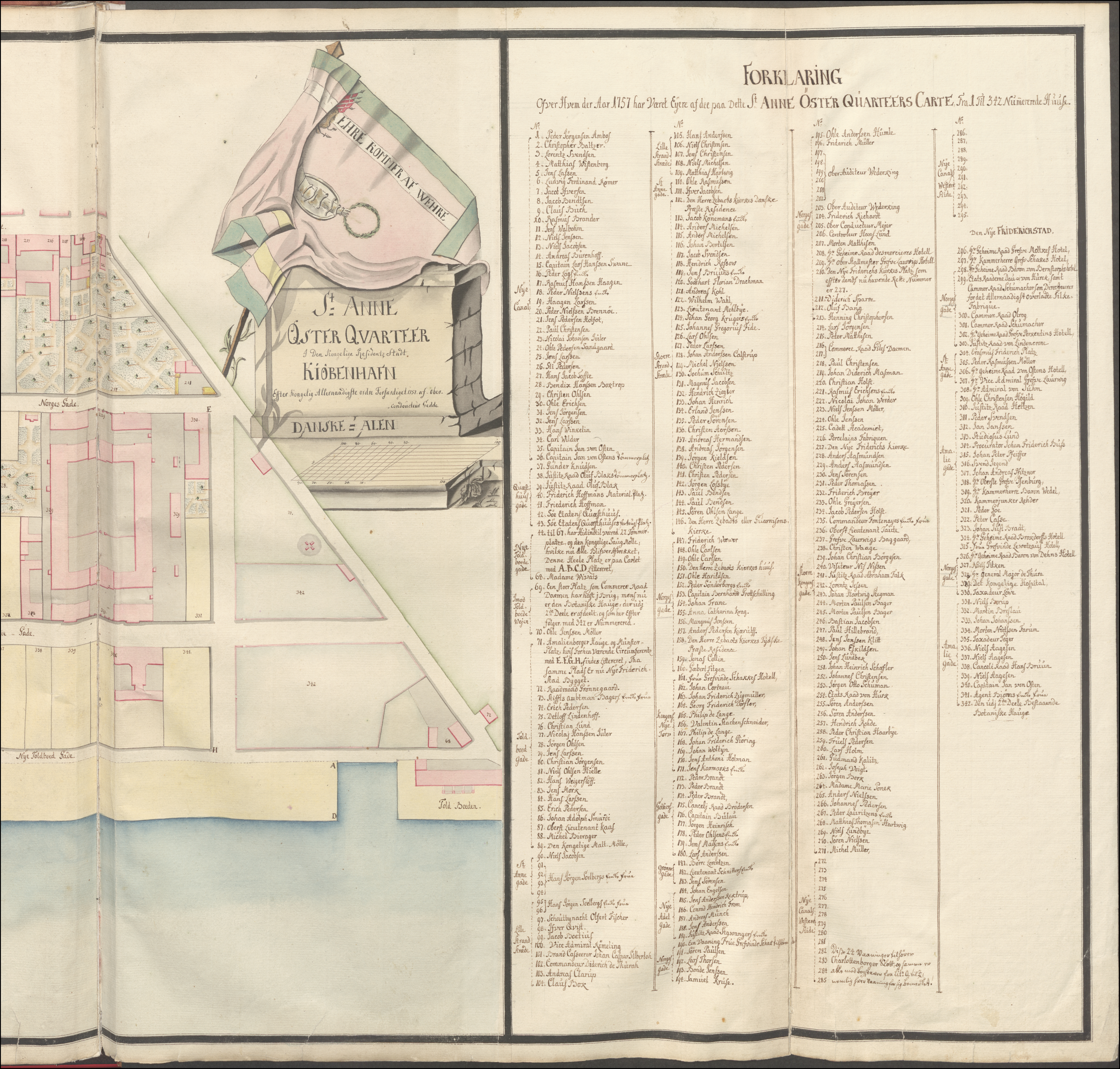
St. Ann's East Quarter

=== St. Ann's West Quarter ===
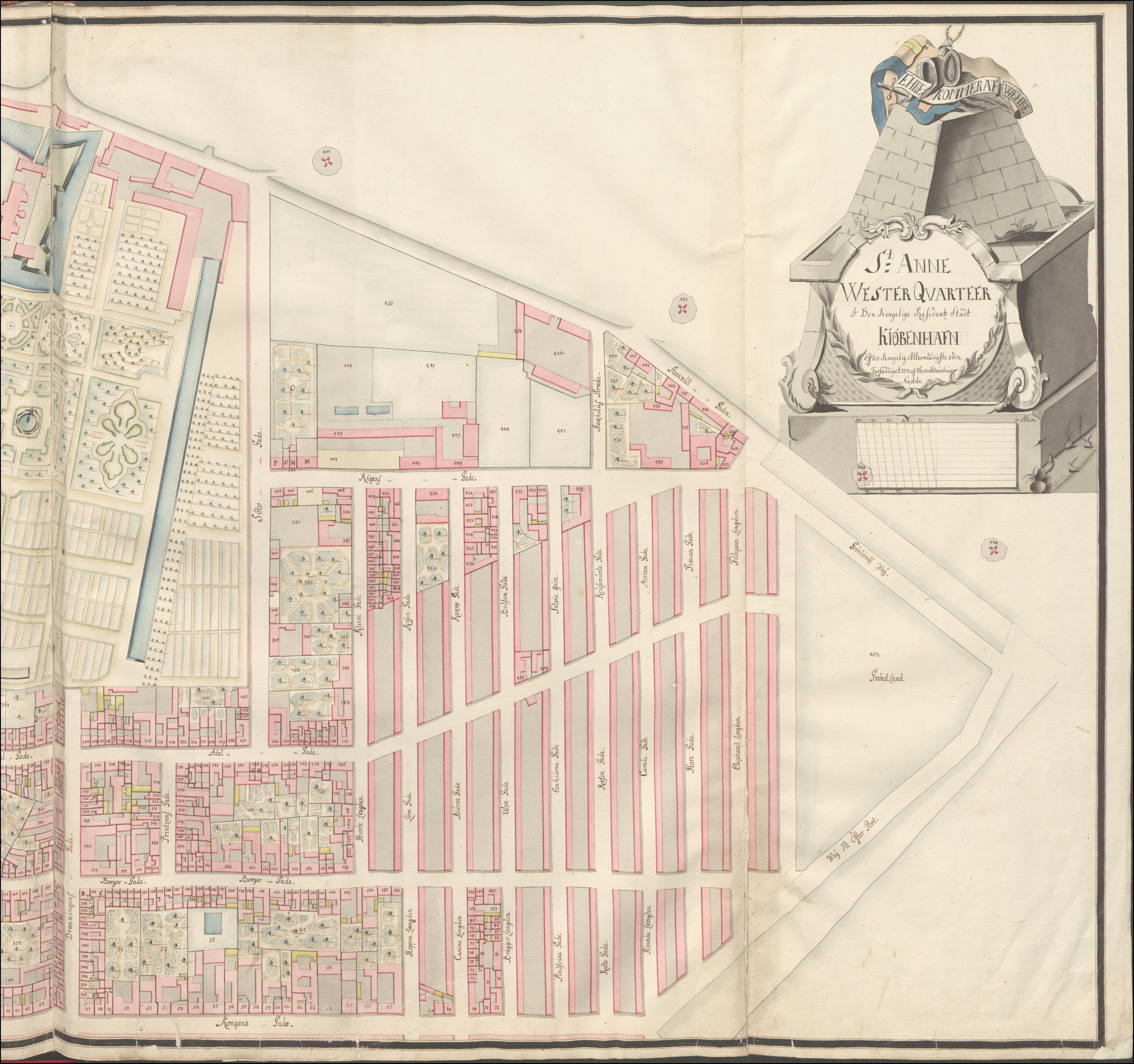
St. Ann's West Quarter
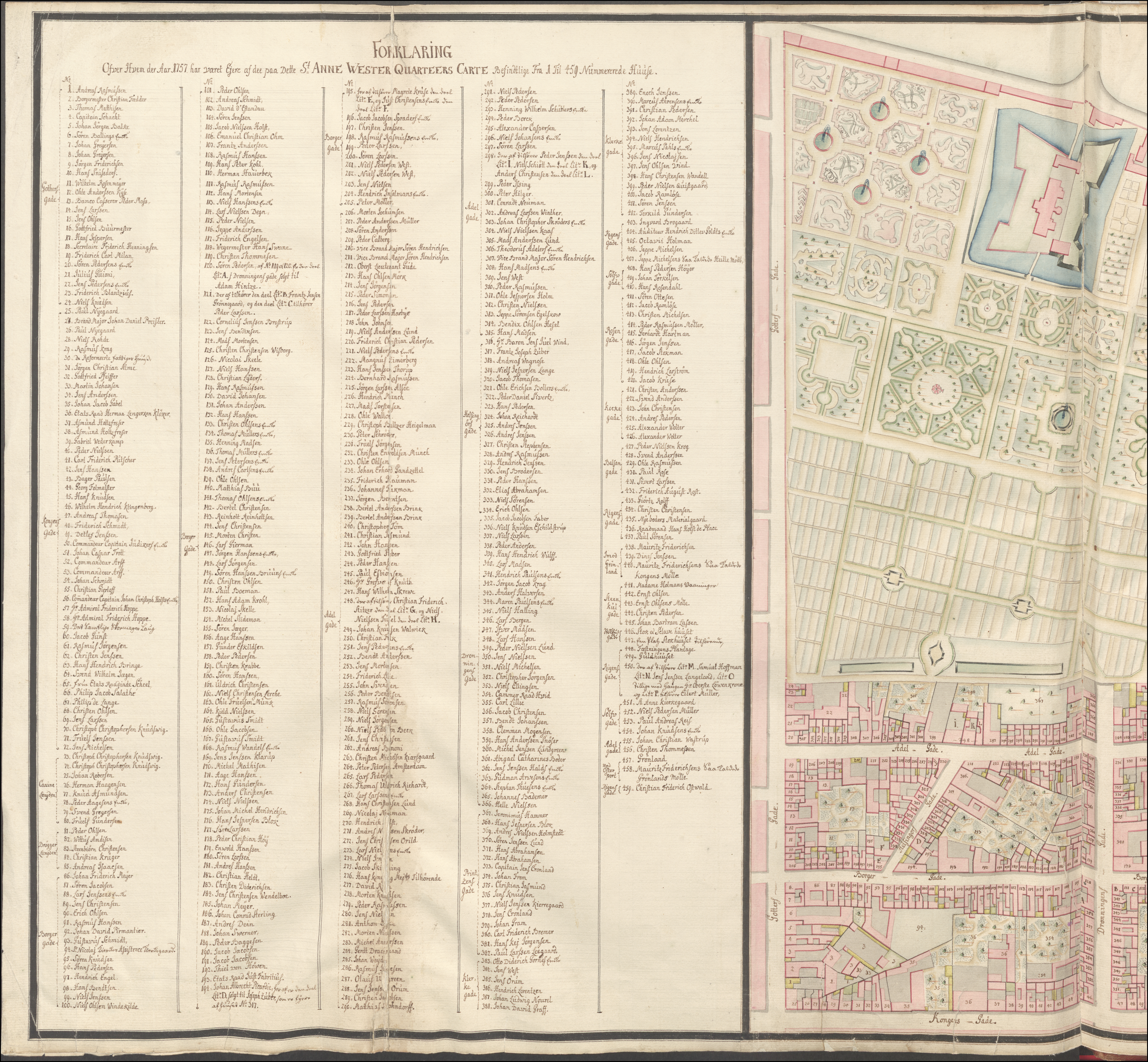
St. Ann's West Quarter

=== Snaren's Quarter ===
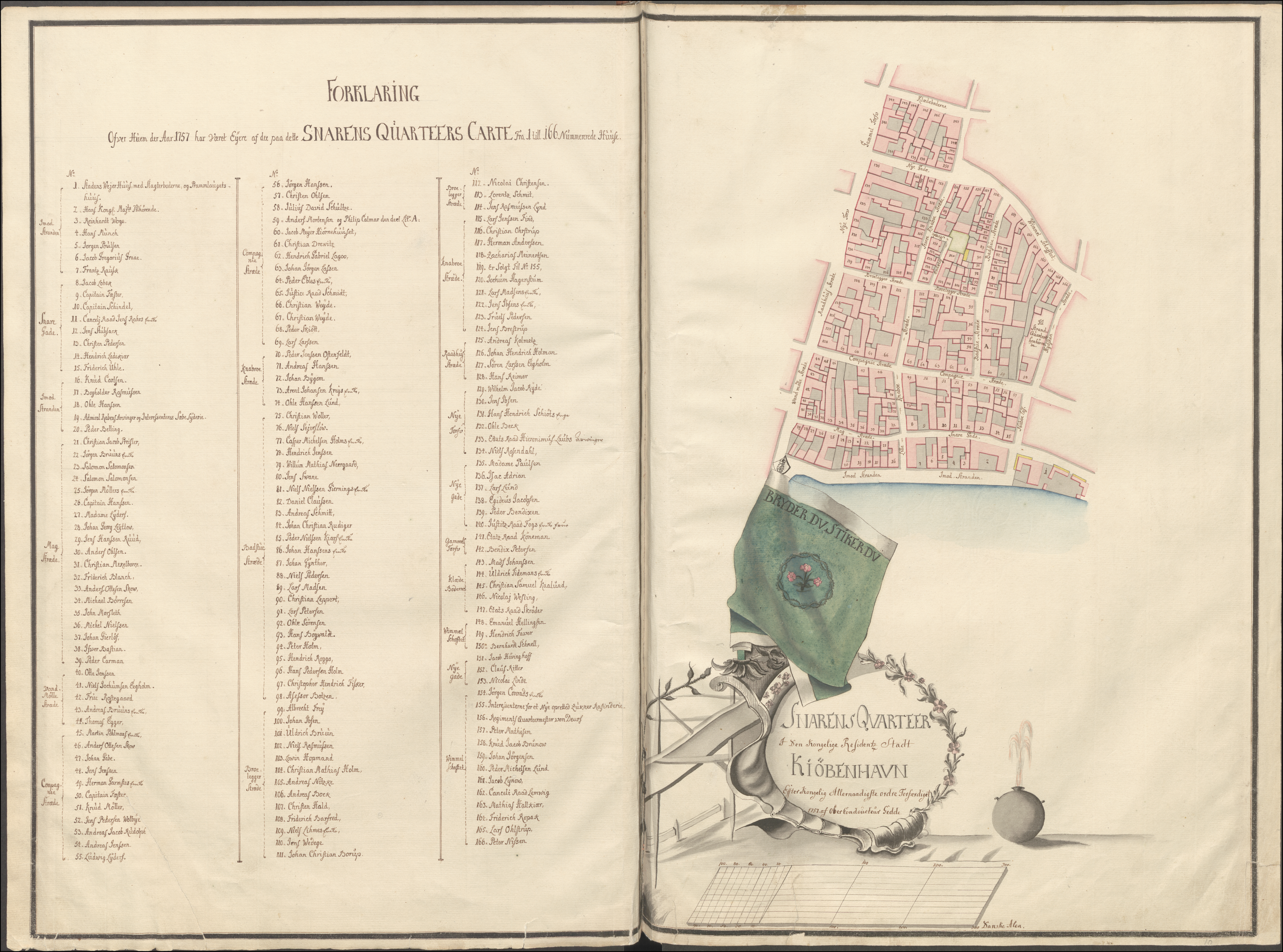
Snaren's Quarter

=== Strand Quarter ===
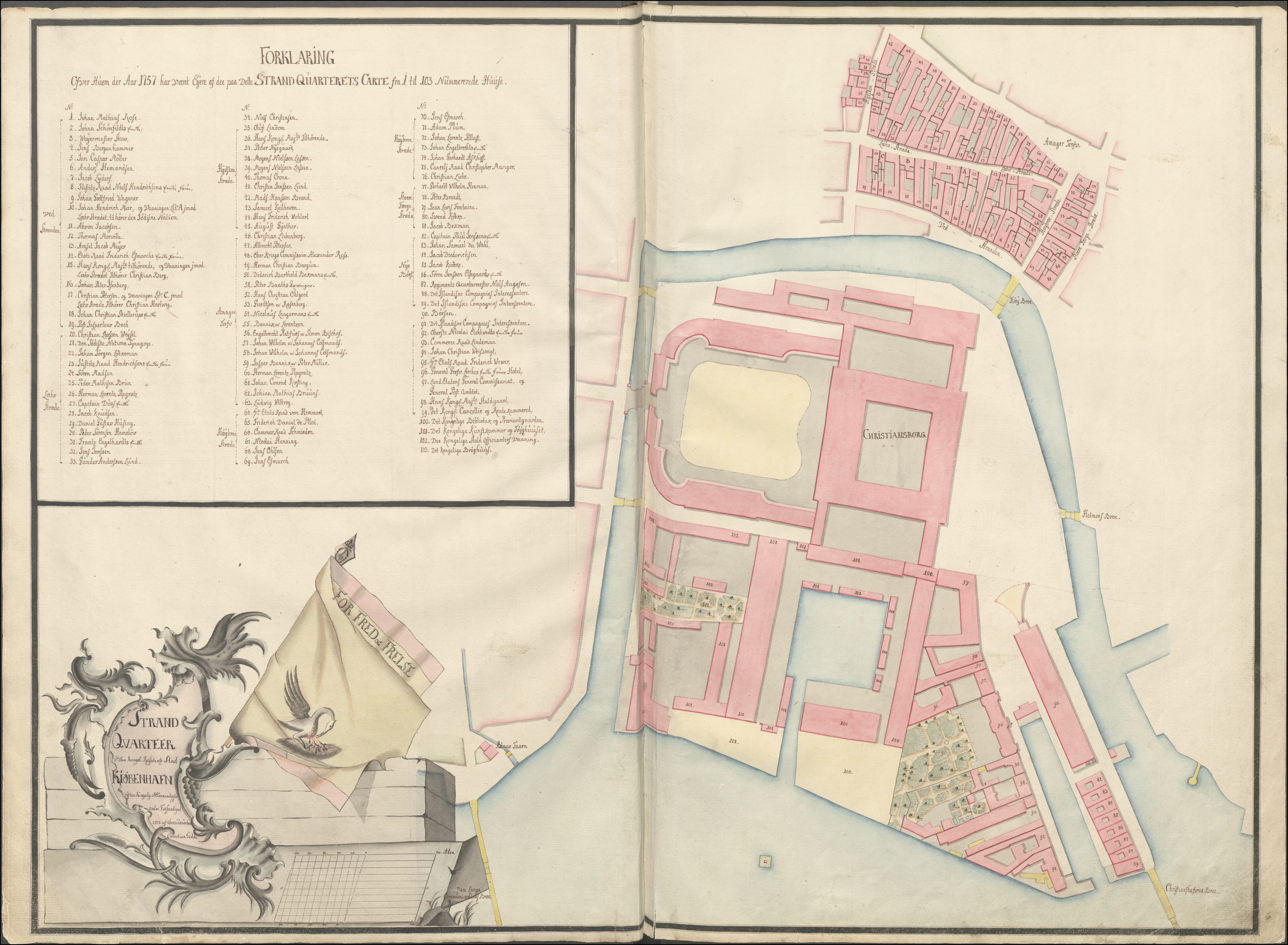
Strand Quarter

=== West Quarter ===
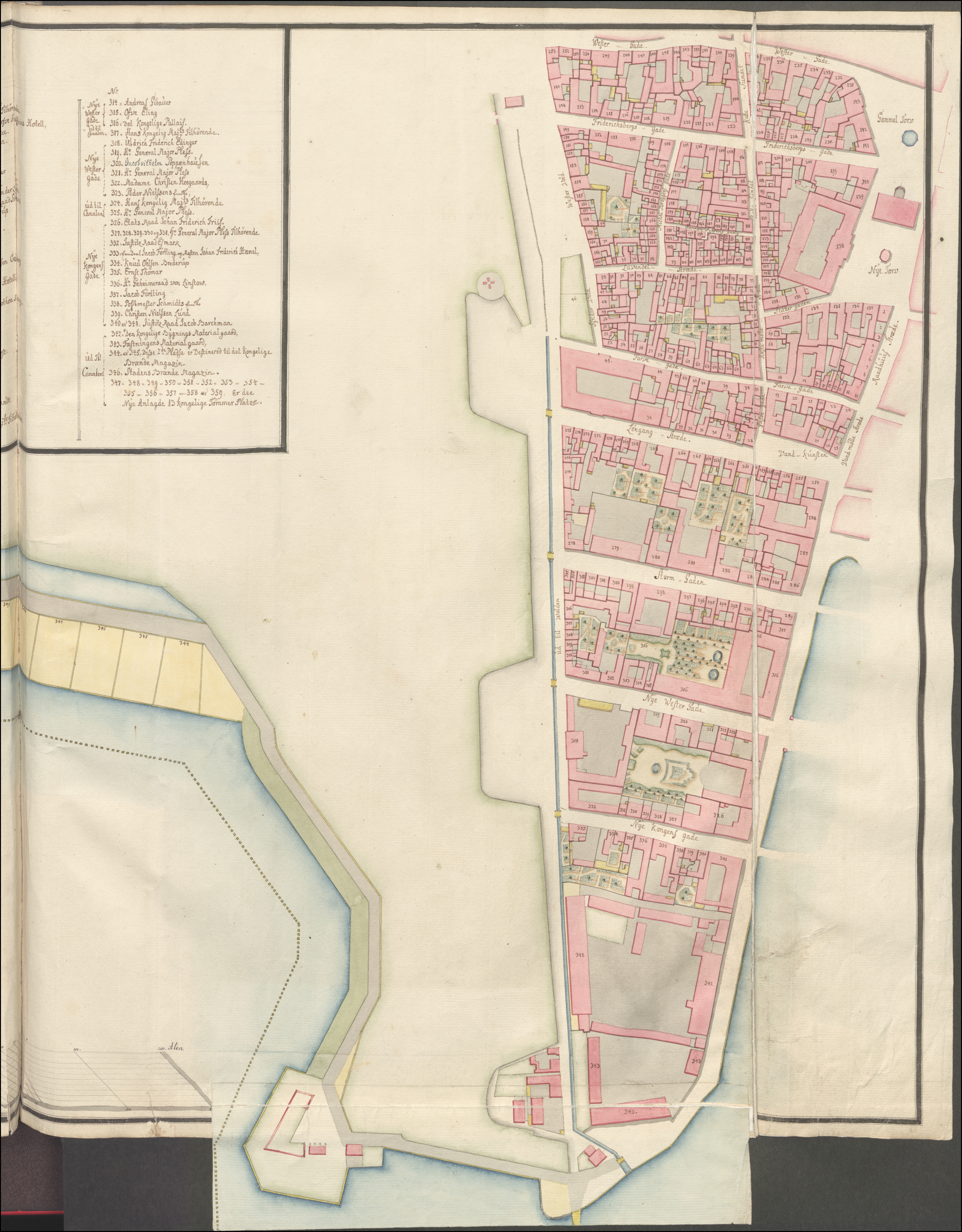
West Quarter
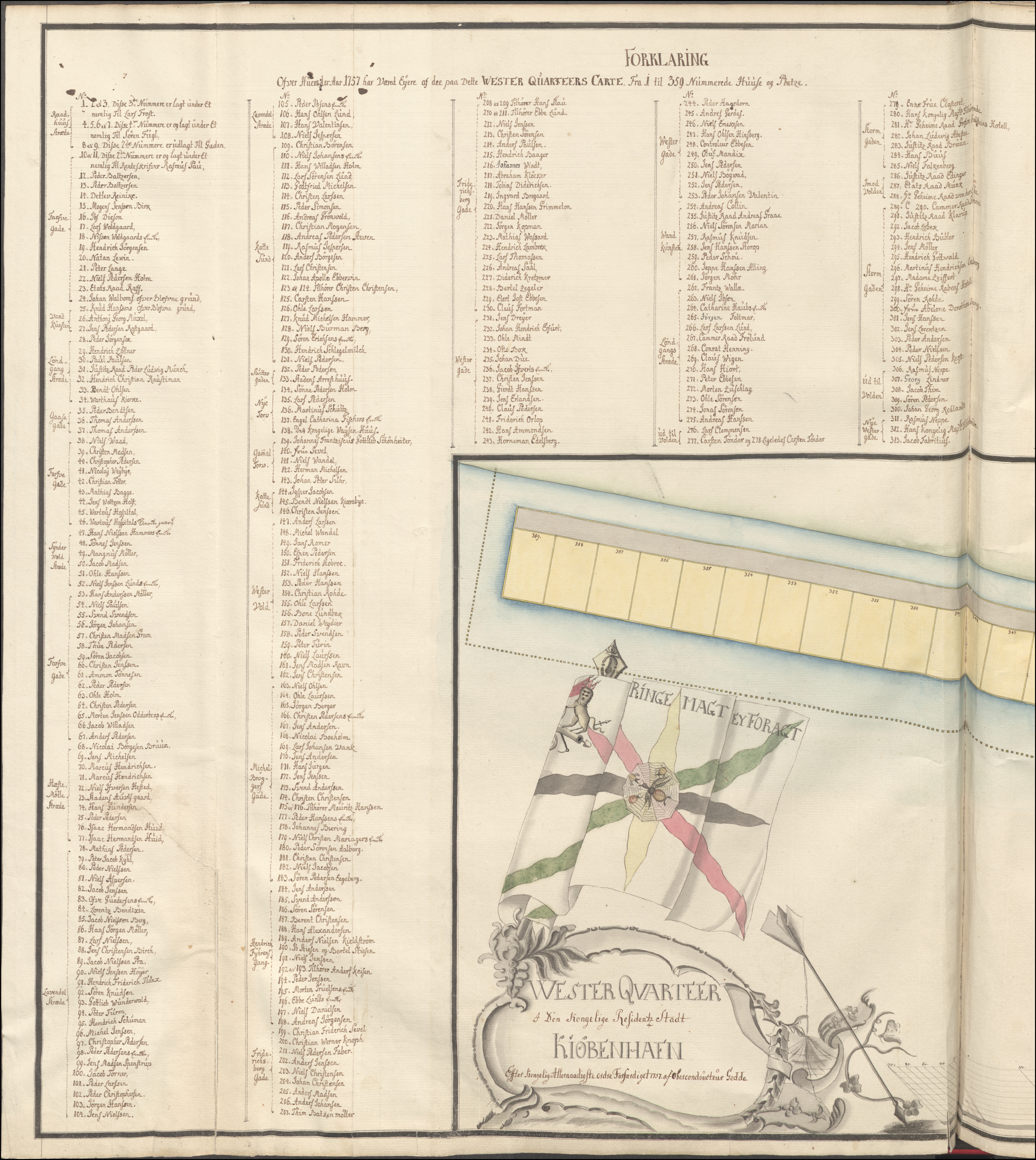
West Quarter
