= Louis Bretez =

The Turgot map in its assembled form drawn by Louis Bretez

Louis Bretez (died 1737) was a draughtsman, engraver, cartographer and designer of architectural ornament. In 1706 he published La Perspective pratique de l'Architecture. He was a professor of perspective and a member of the Académie de peinture et de sculpture de Saint-Luc.

In 1734 he was commissioned to draw up the Turgot map of Paris. By contract, Turgot requested a very faithful reproduction with great accuracy. Bretez was allowed to enter mansions, houses and gardens to take measurements and draw pictures, and worked on the project from 1734 to 1736.
