= Turgot map of Paris =

18th-century map of Paris

The Turgot map in its assembled form

The Turgot map of Paris (/tʊərˈɡoʊ/ toor-GOH; French: Plan de Turgot [tyʁɡo]) is a highly accurate and detailed map of the city of Paris, France, as it existed in the 1730s. The map was commissioned by Parisian municipality chief Michel-Étienne Turgot, drawn up by surveyor Louis Bretez, and engraved by Claude Lucas.

== Description ==
The Turgot map was published in 1739 as an atlas of twenty non-overlapping sectional bird's-eye-view maps (at a scale of approximately 1:400) in isometric perspective toward the southeast. Additionally, there is one simplified general map with a four-by-five grid showing the layout of the twenty sectional maps. The atlas covers an area approximately corresponding to the first eleven of the modern-day arrondissements of Paris. Each sectional map consists of double-facing sheets and is 80 cm (31 in) wide; the first row is 48 cm (19 in) high, while the remaining rows are 50 cm (20 in) high. The assembled map is 250.5 cm (98.5 in) in height and 322.5 cm (127 in) in width. Turgot's map has been described as "the first all-comprising graphical inventory of the capital, down to the last orchard and tree, detailing every house and naming even the most modest cul-de-sac".

The Turgot map of Paris
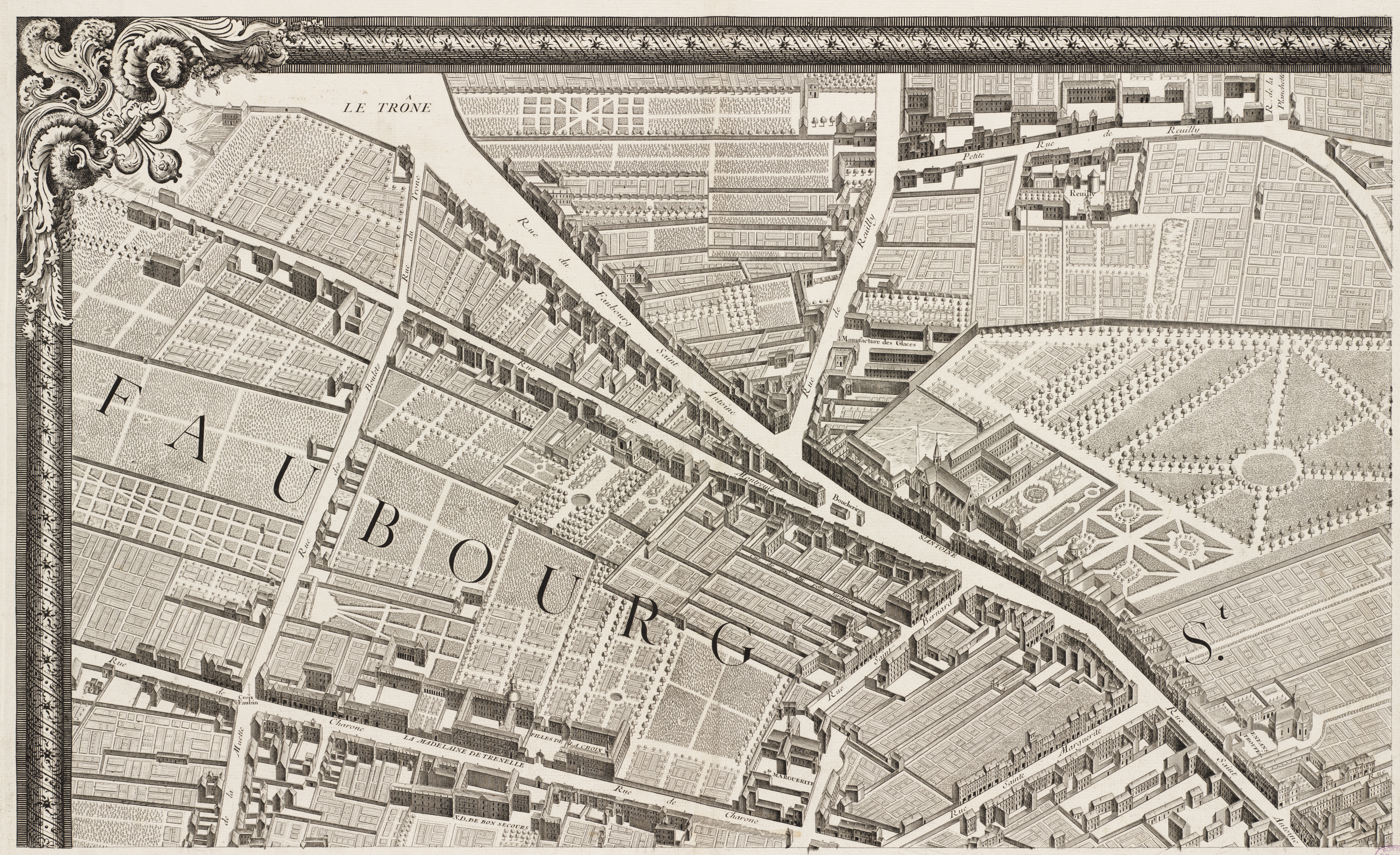

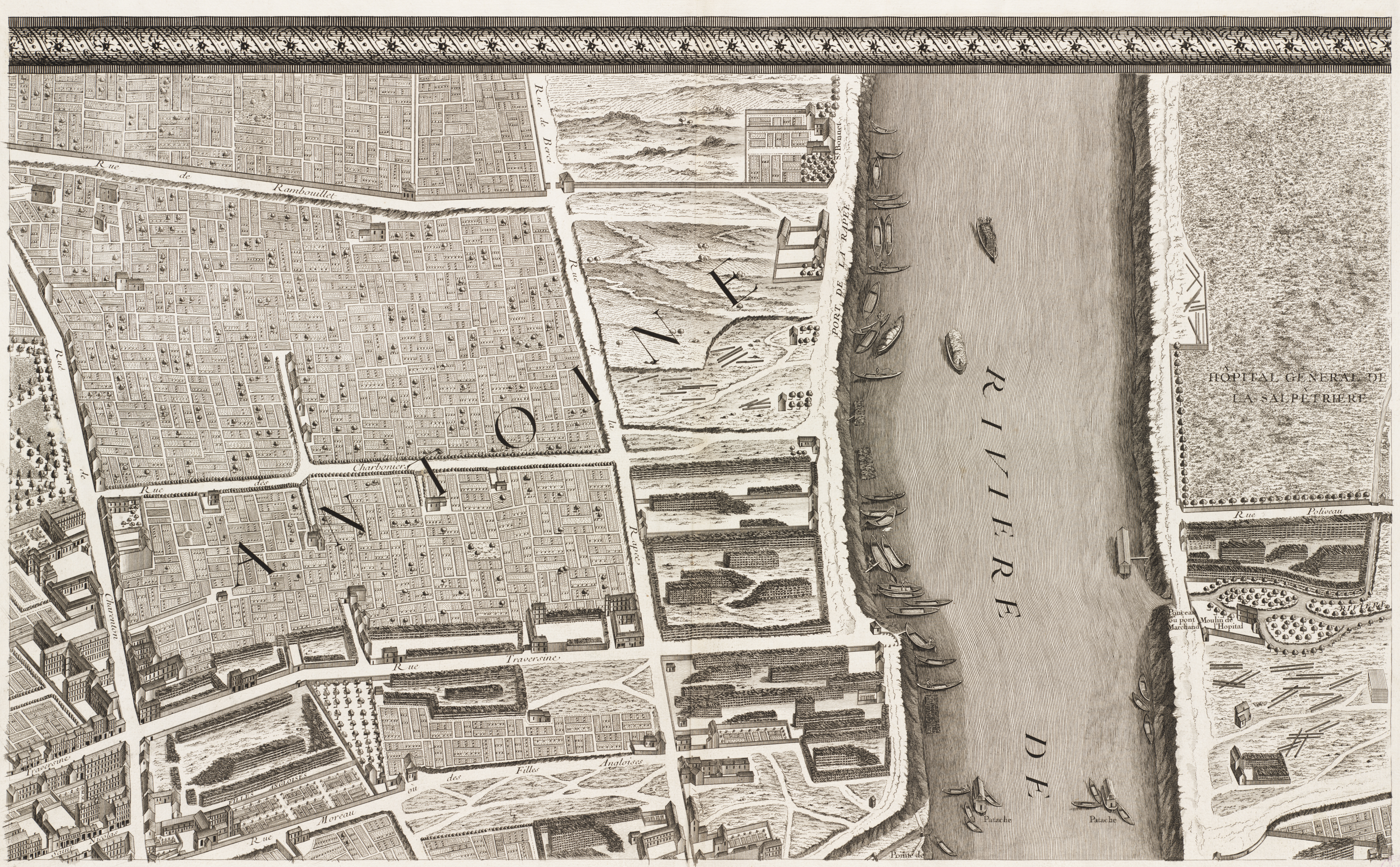

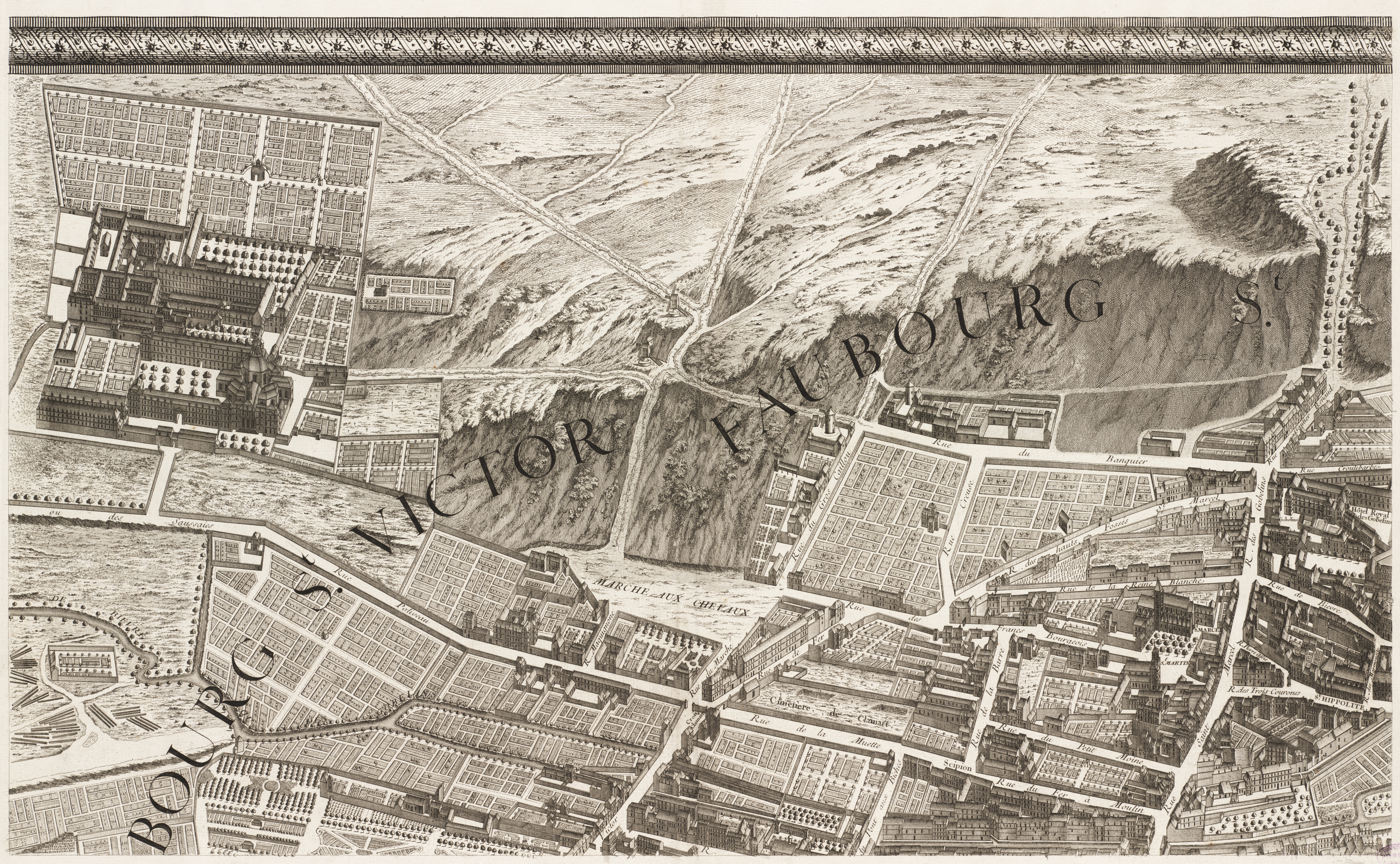

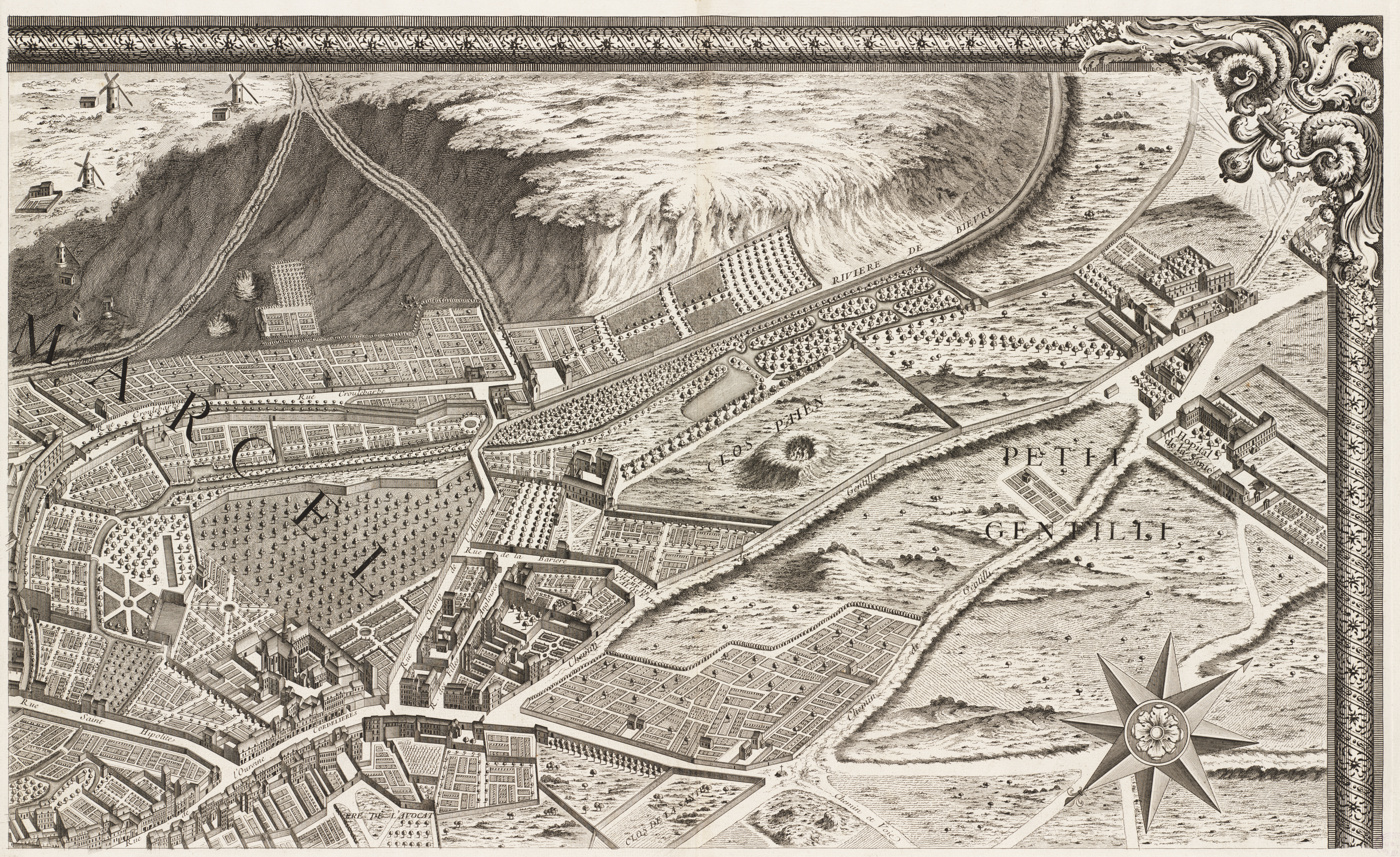

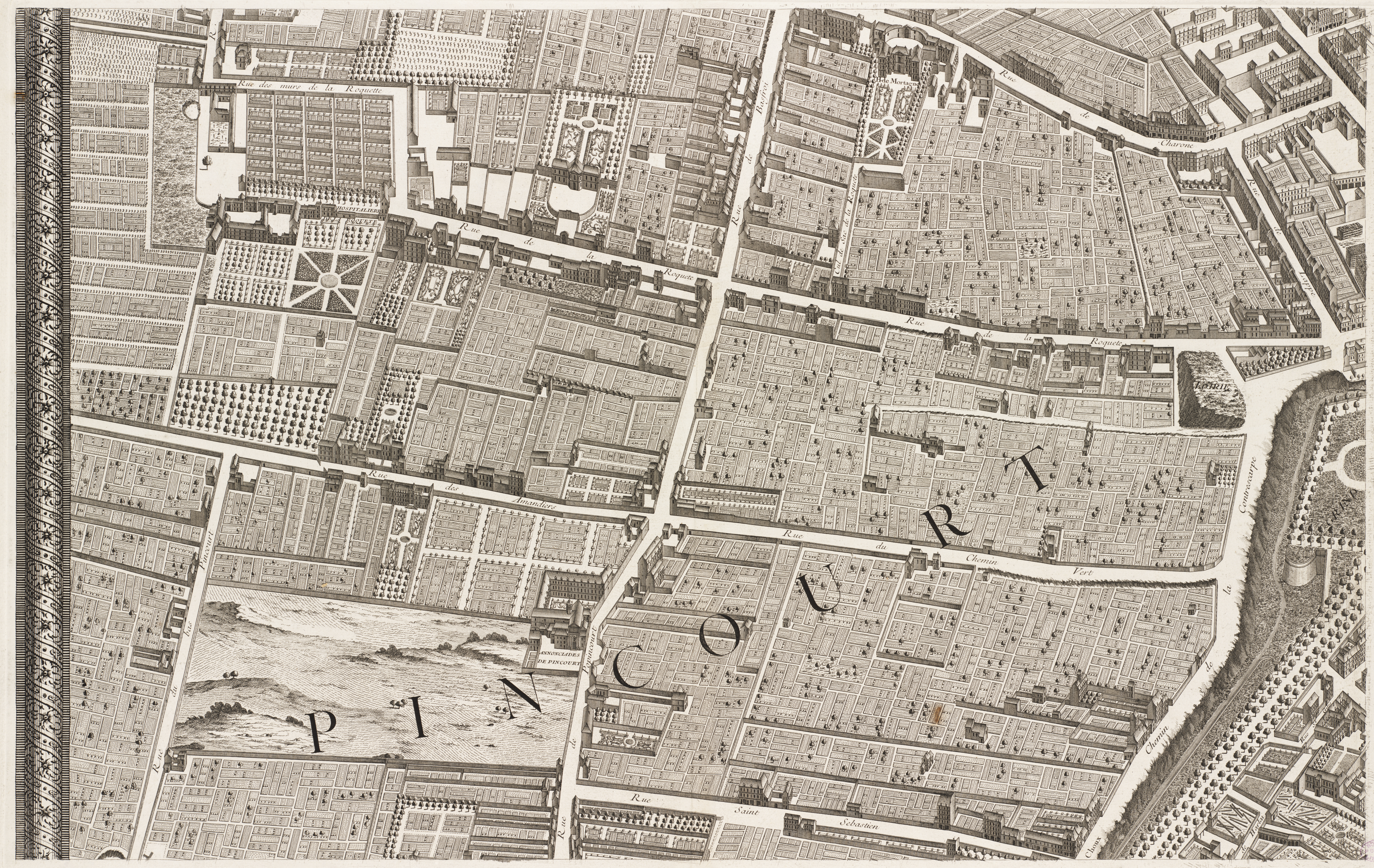

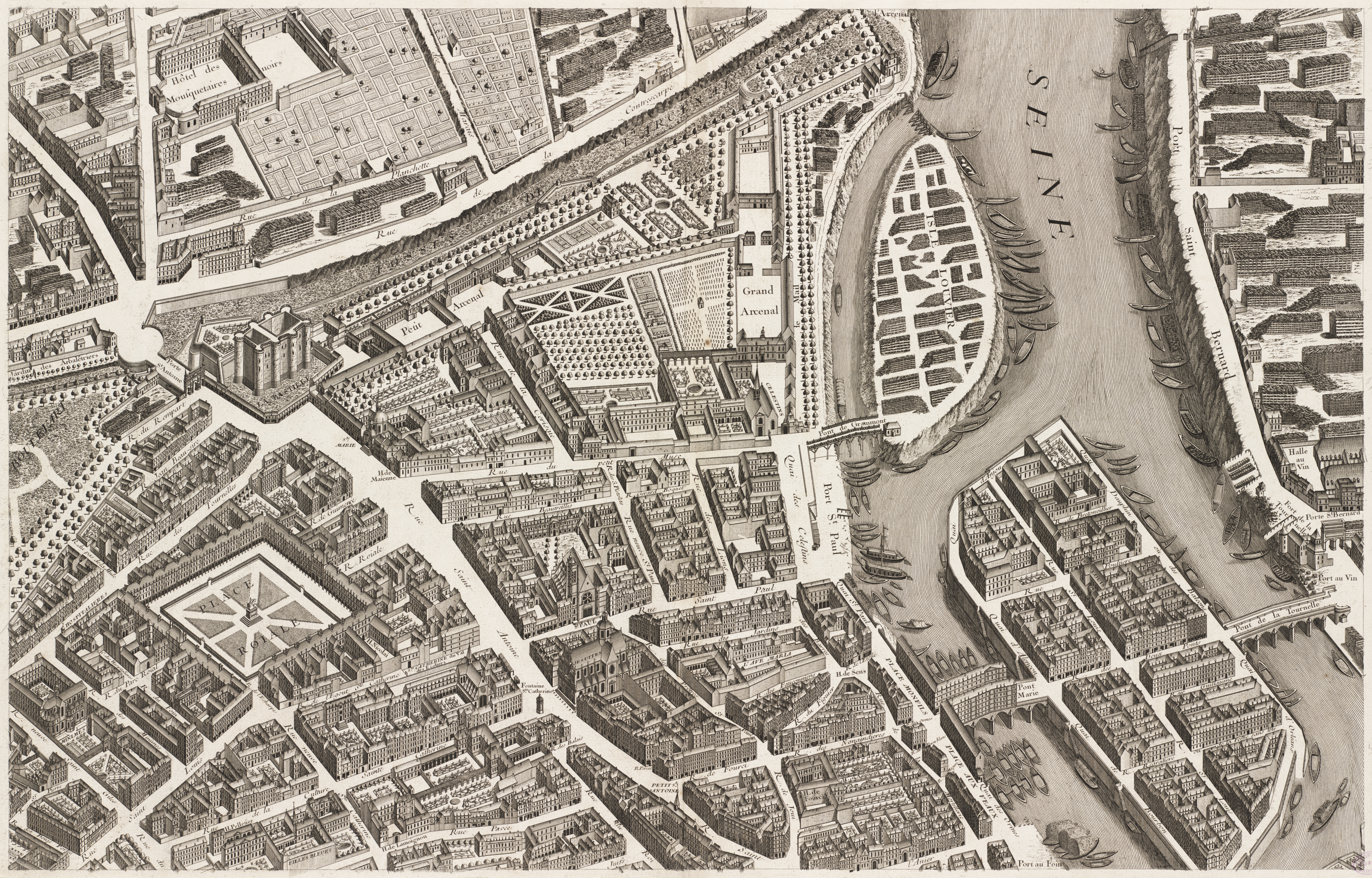

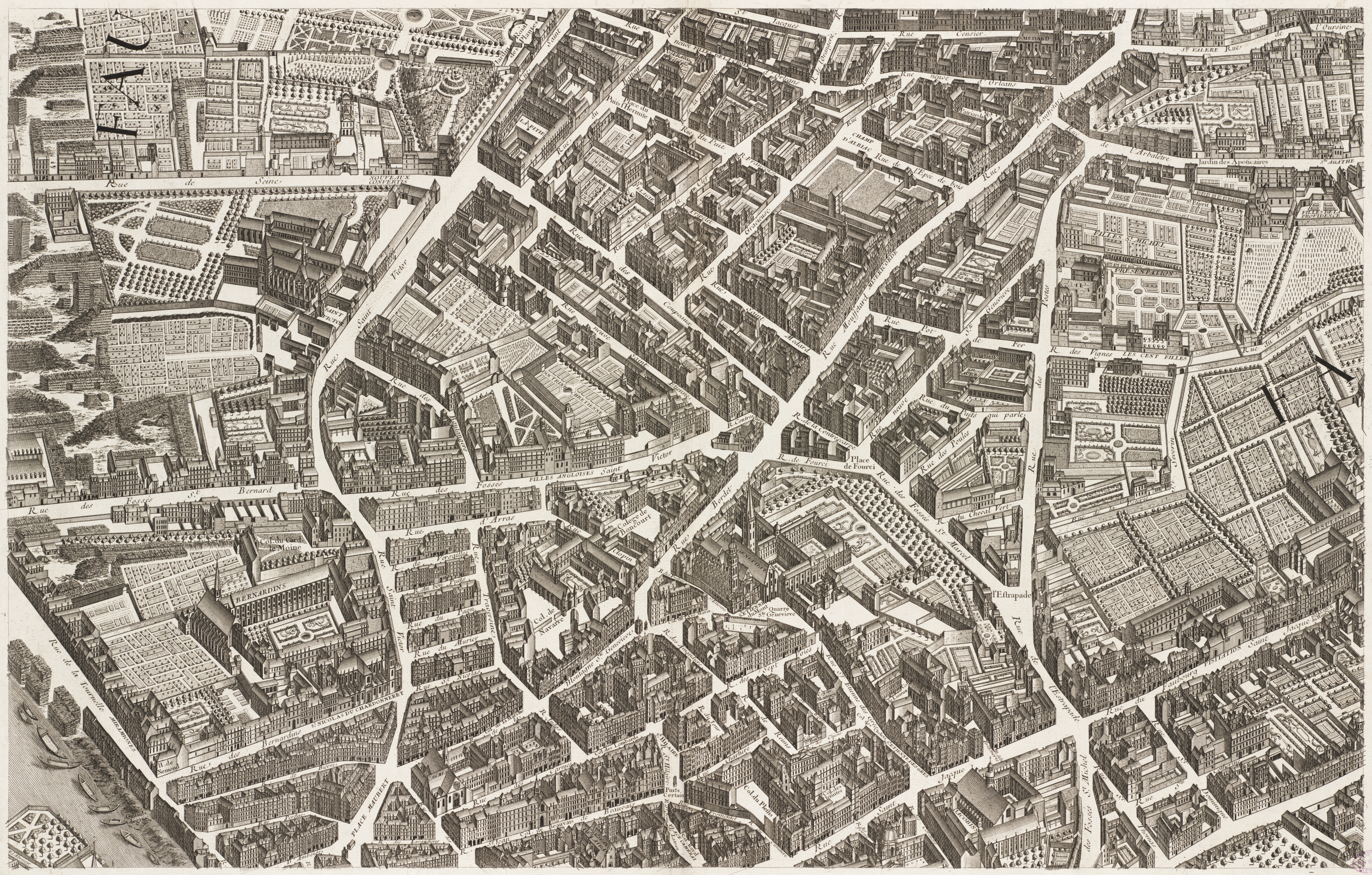

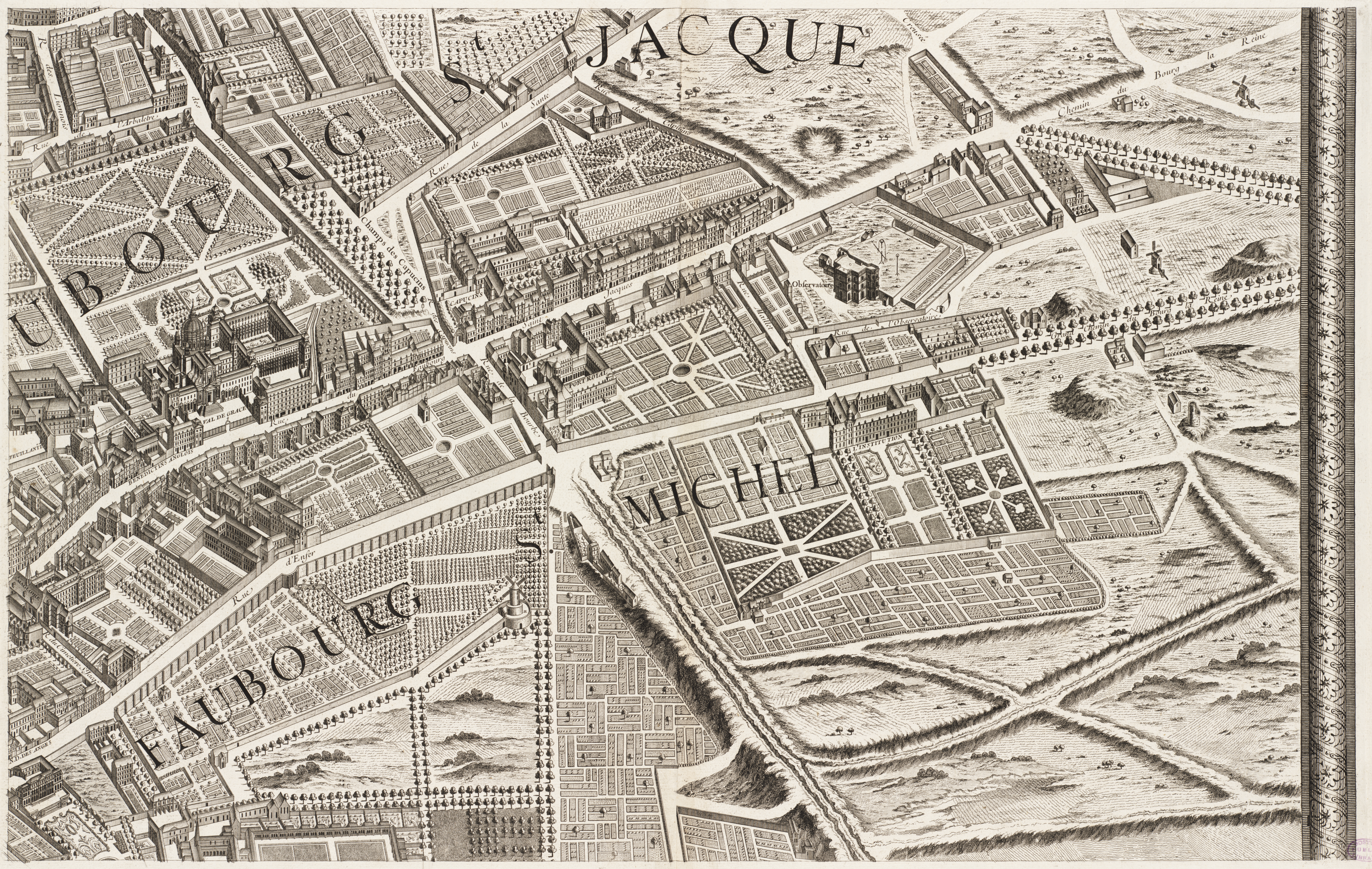

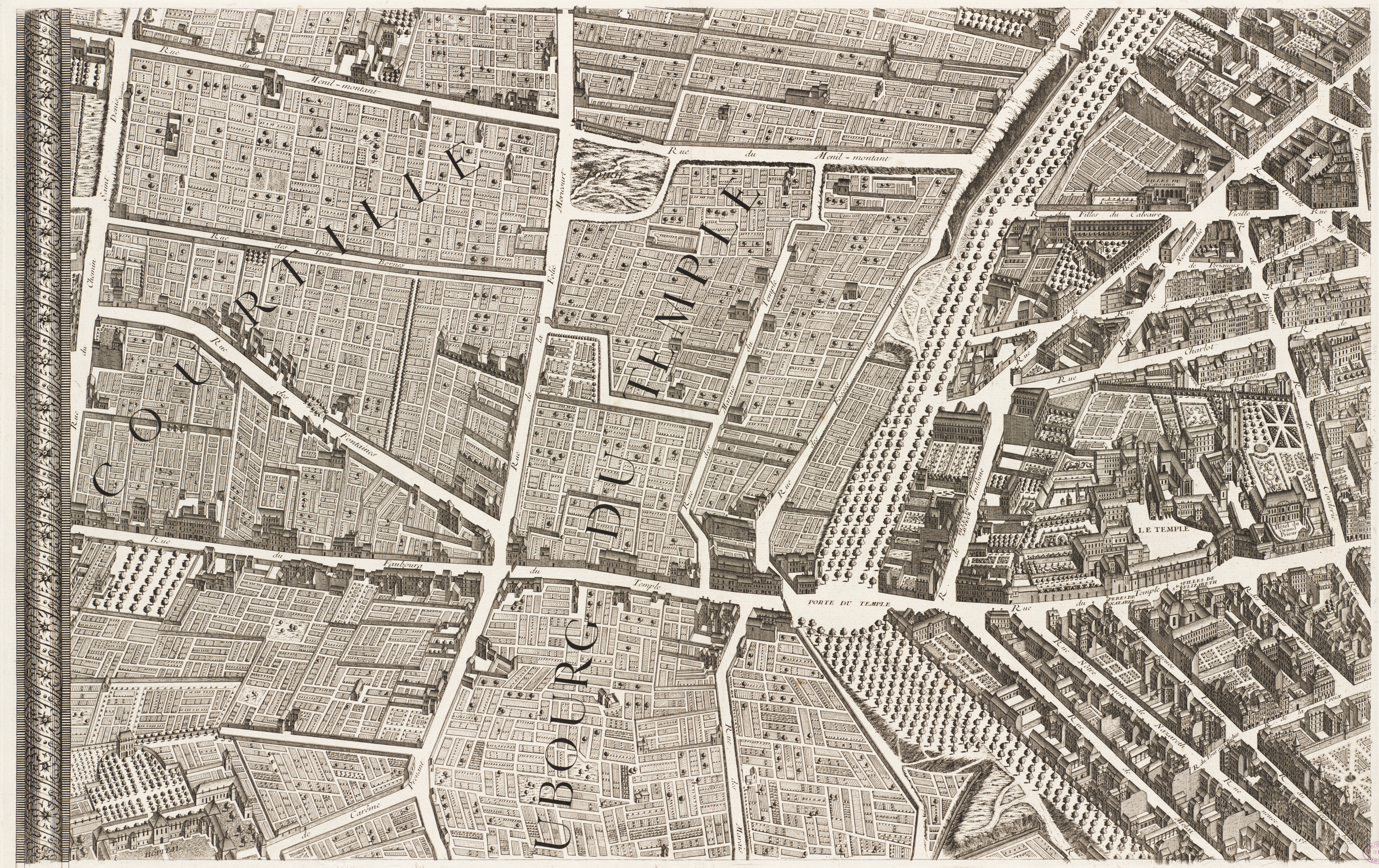

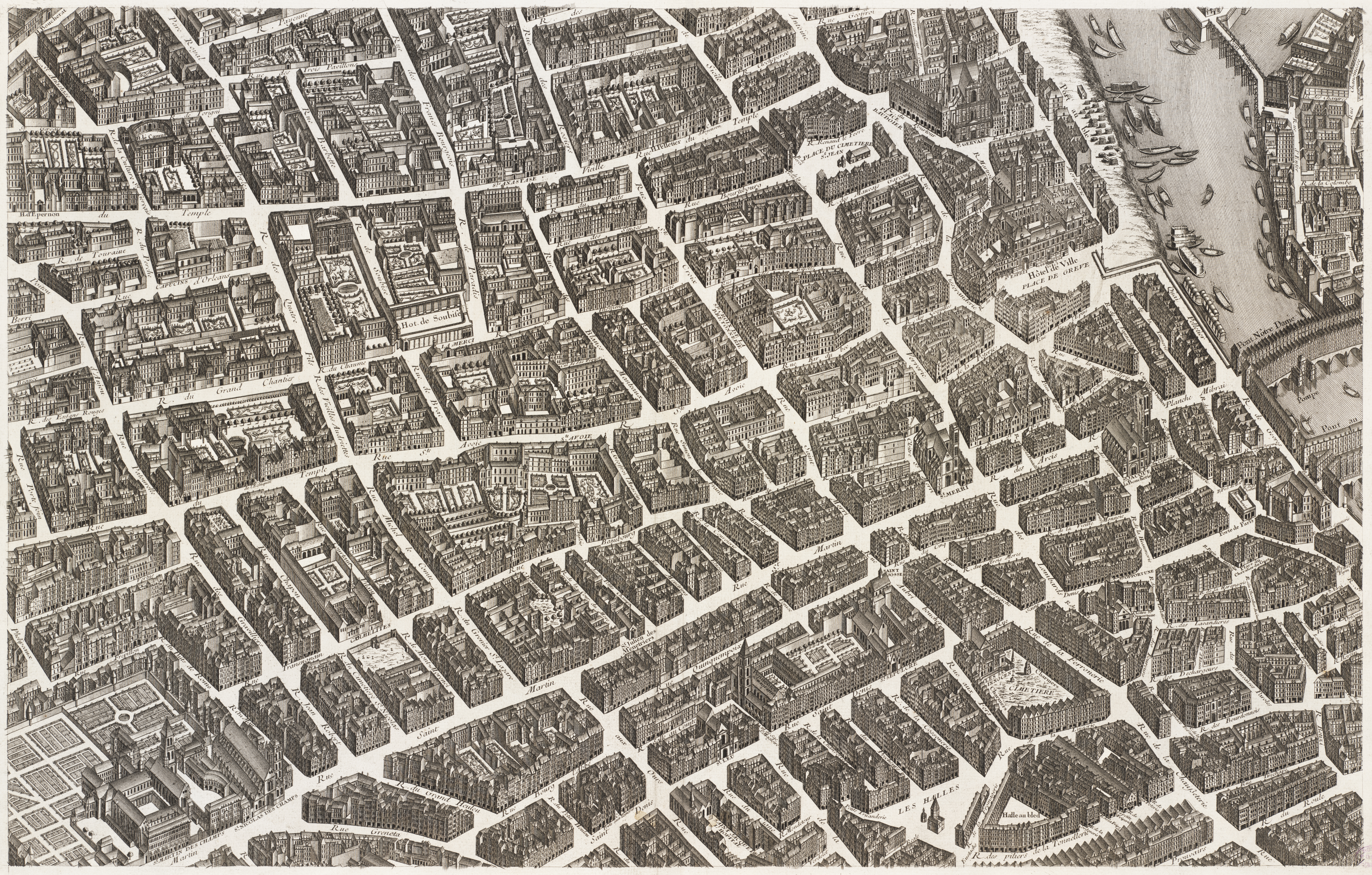

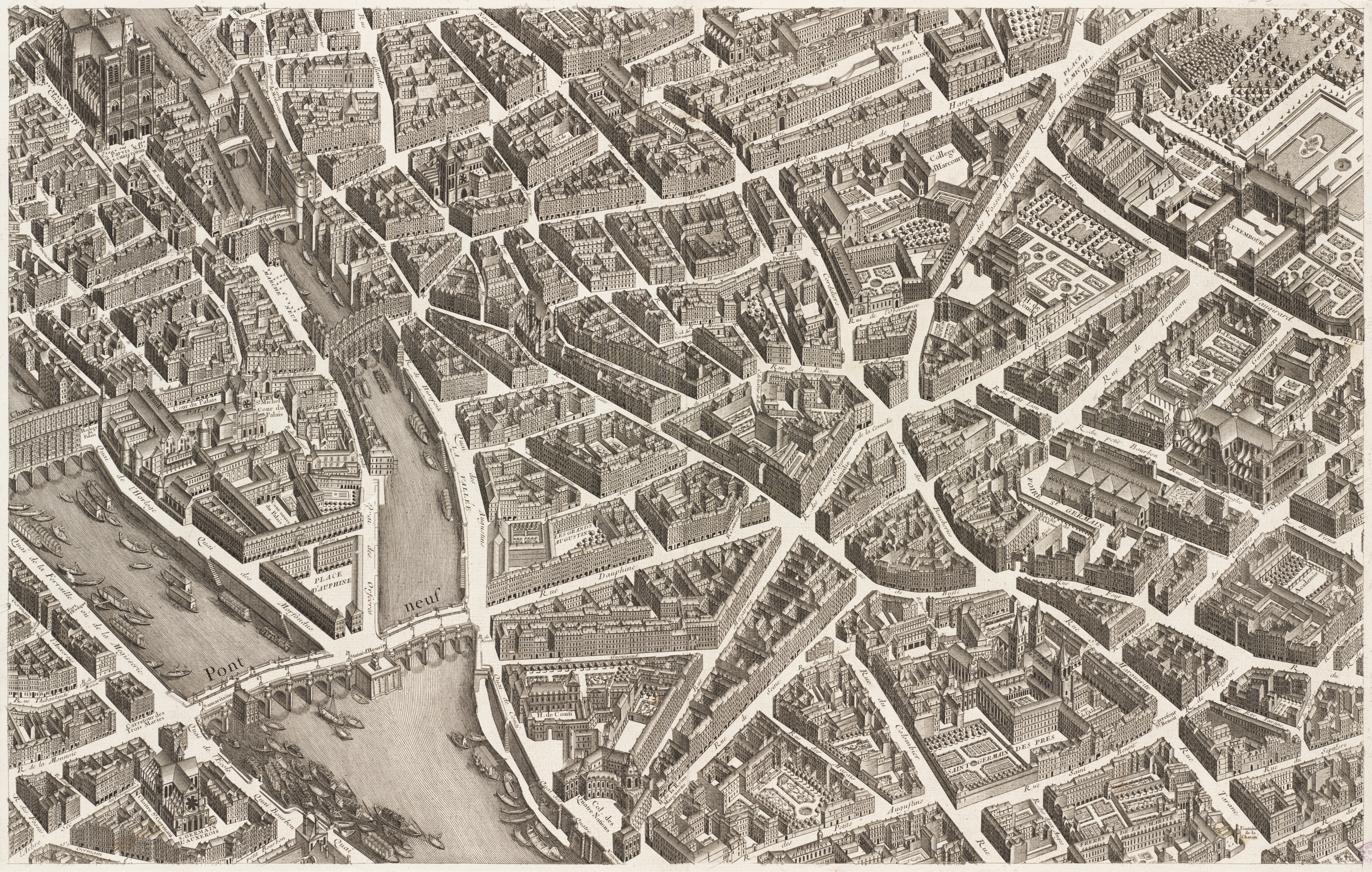

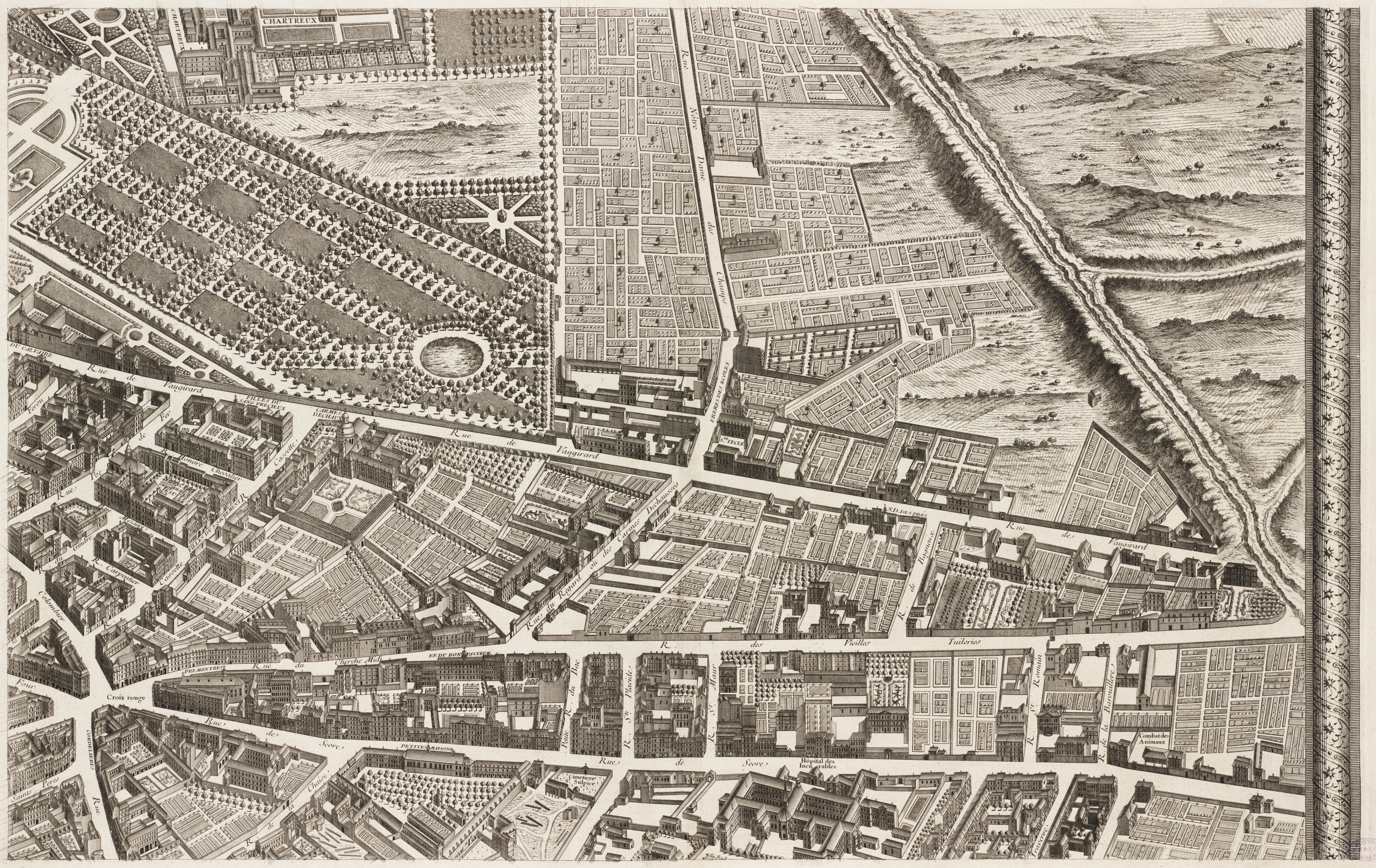

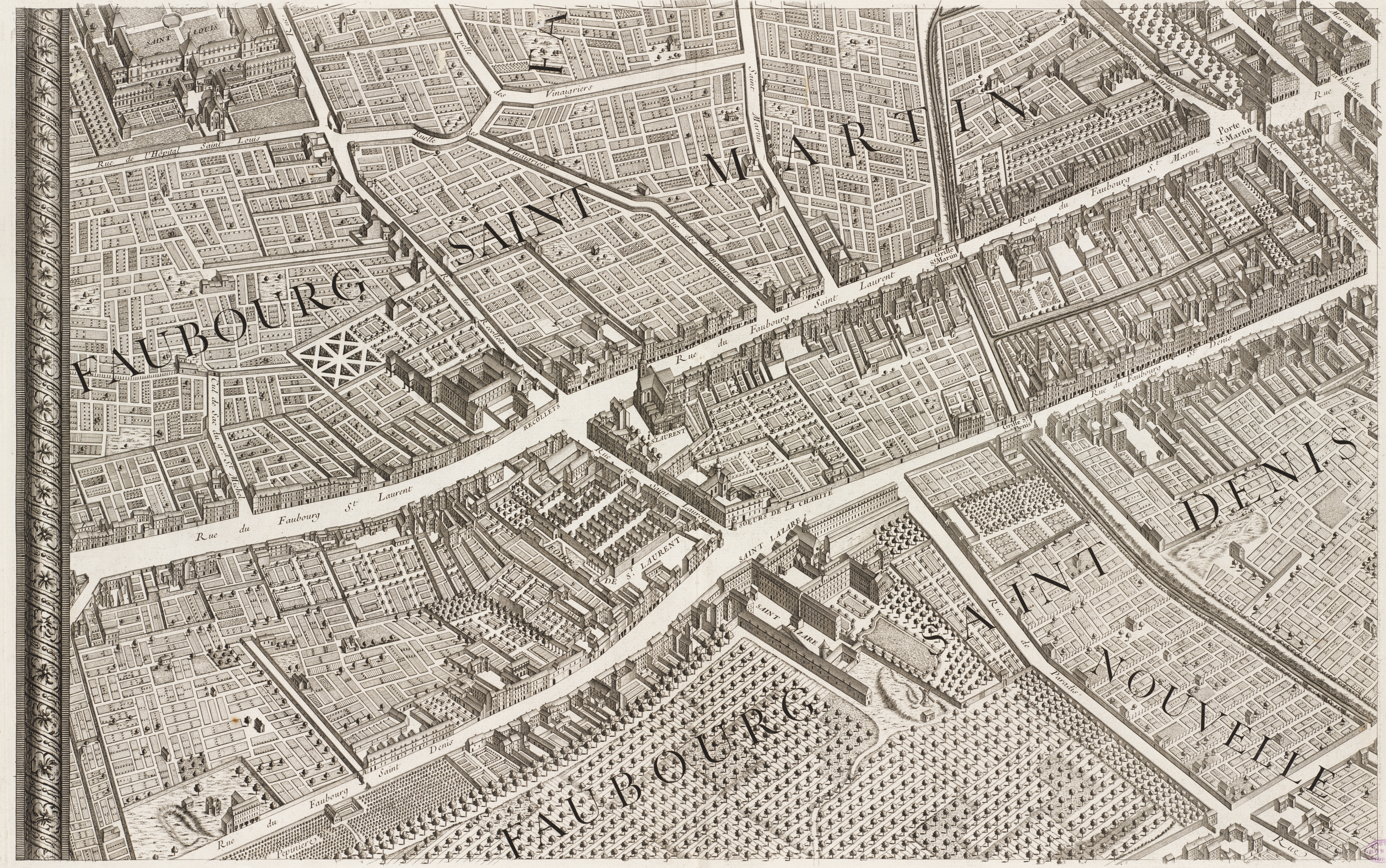

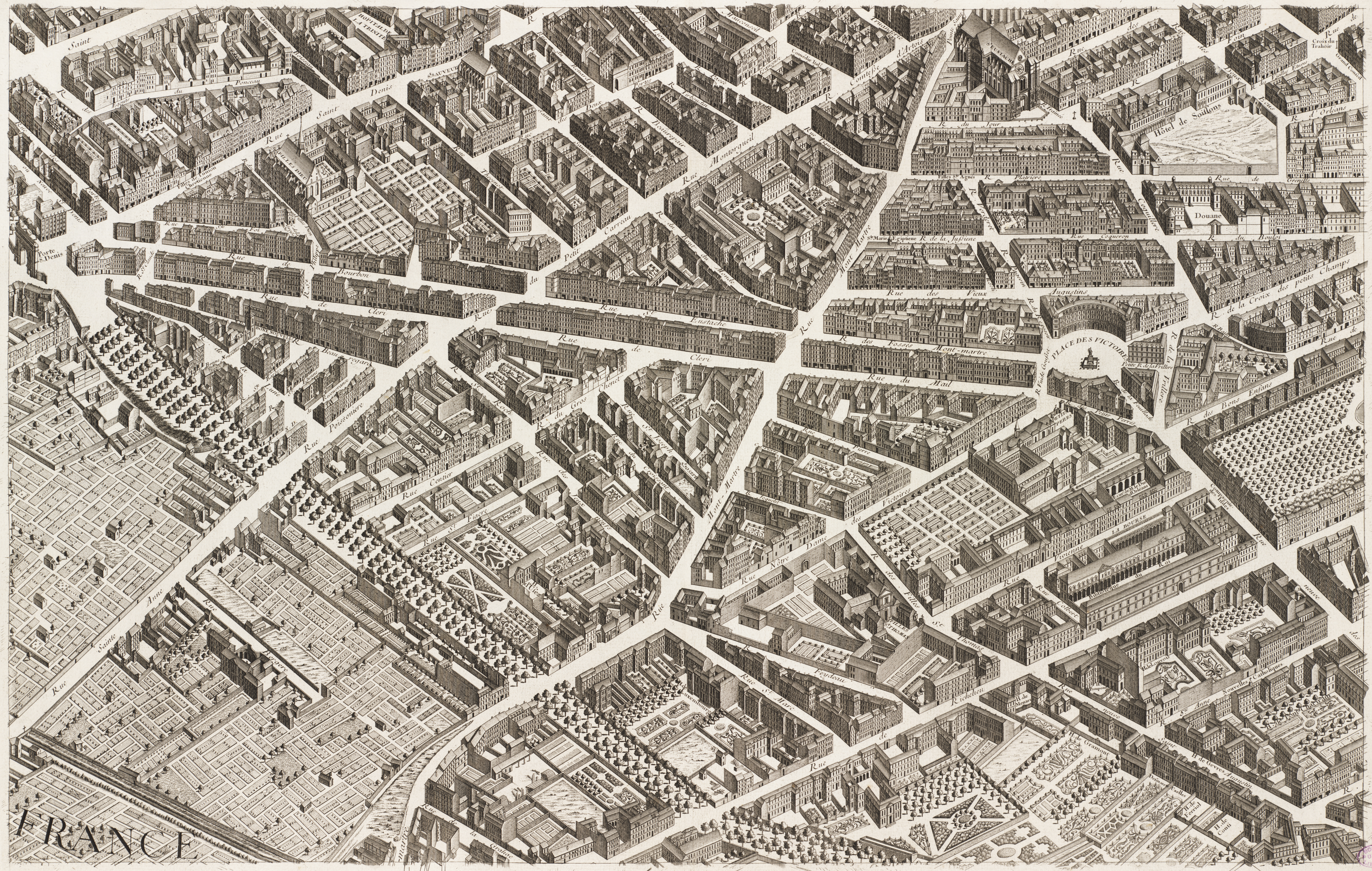

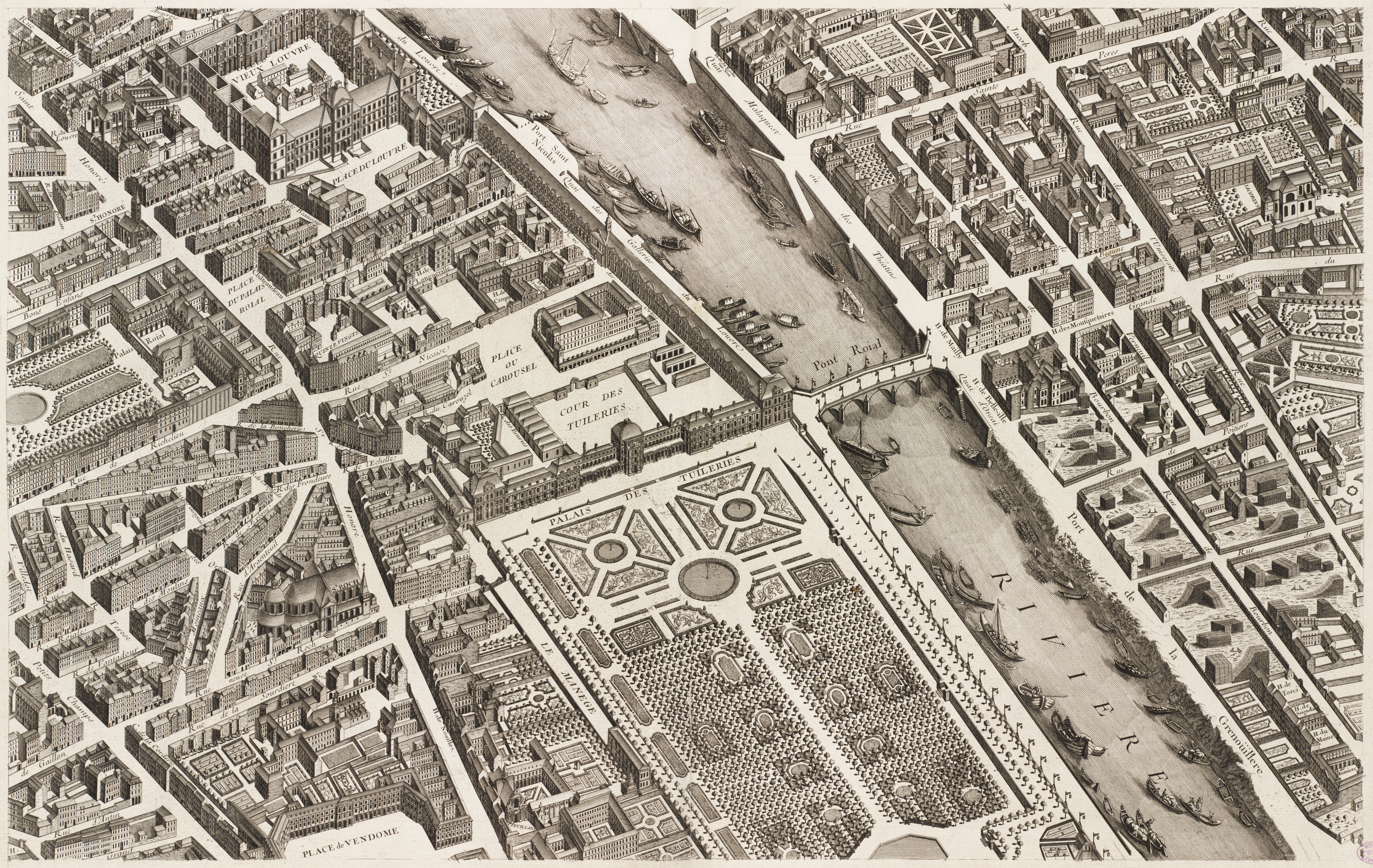

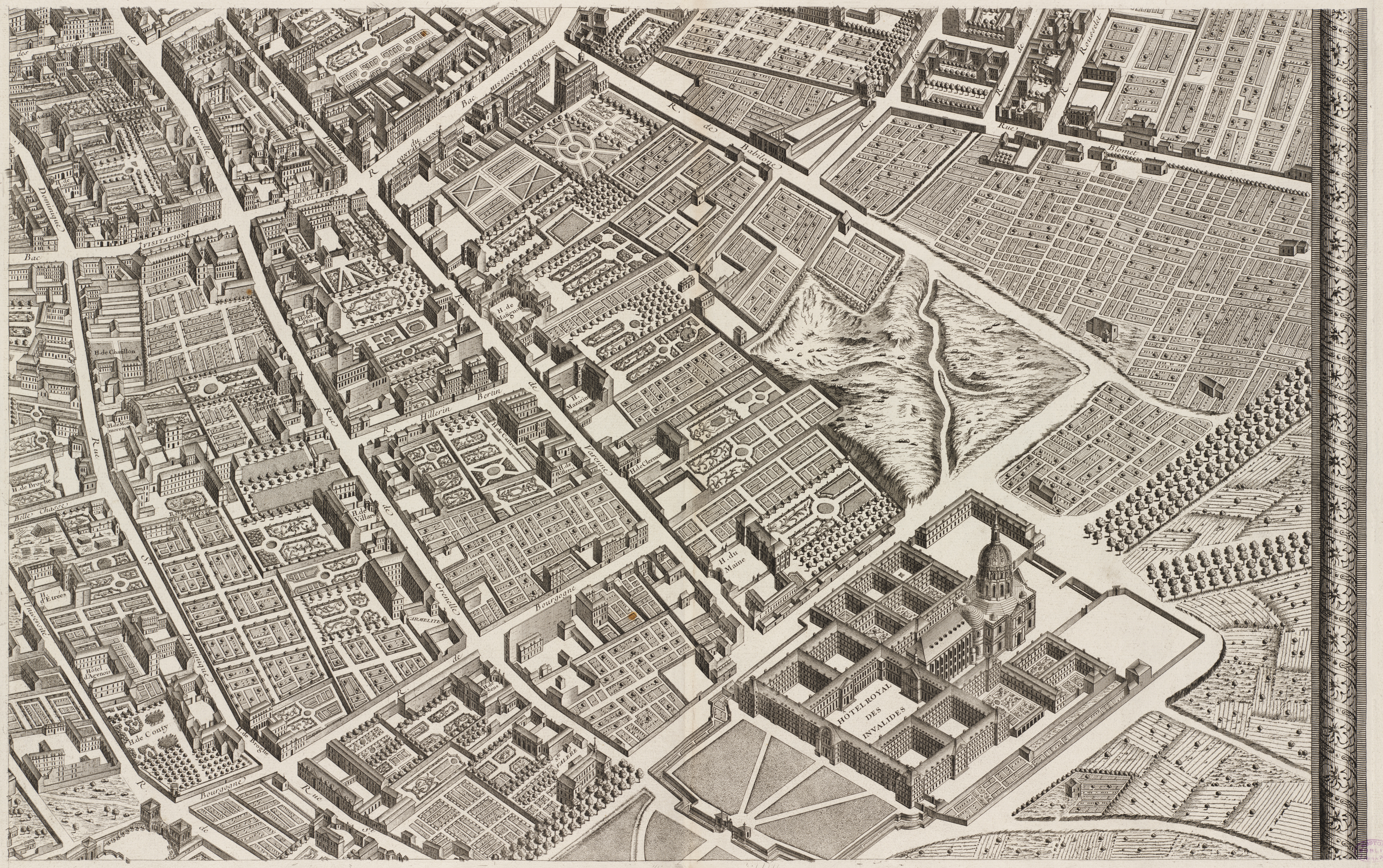

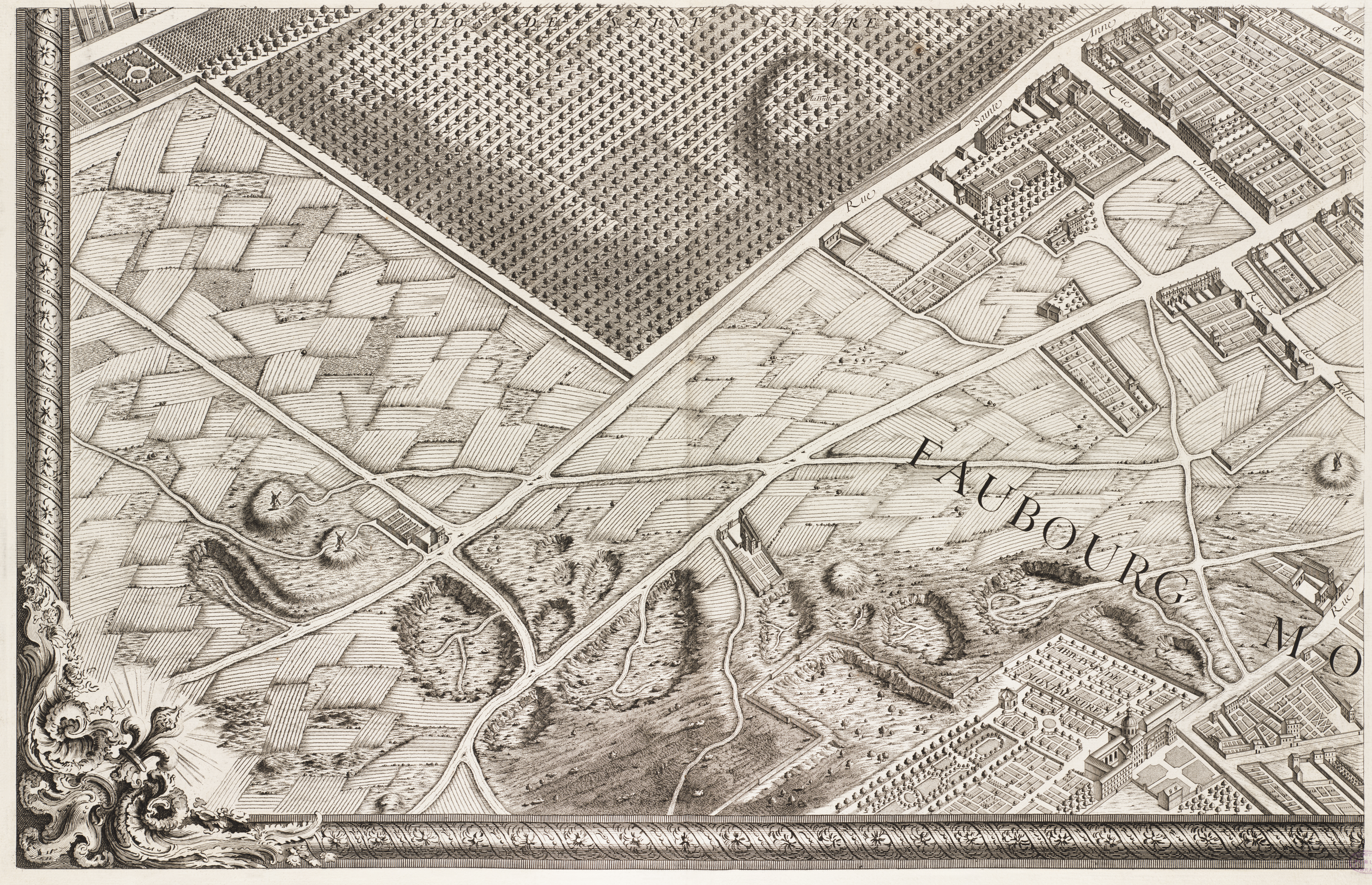

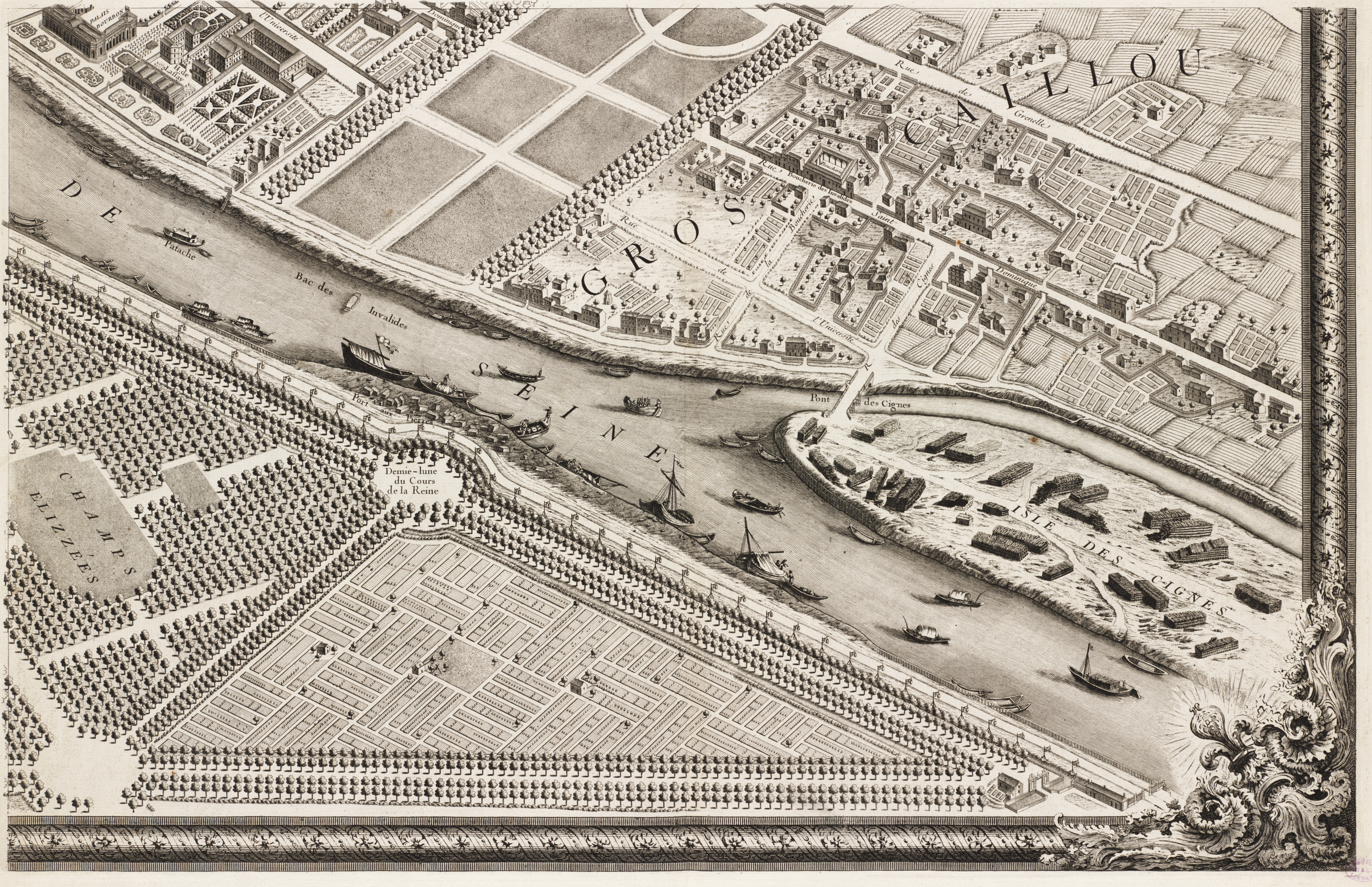

== History ==
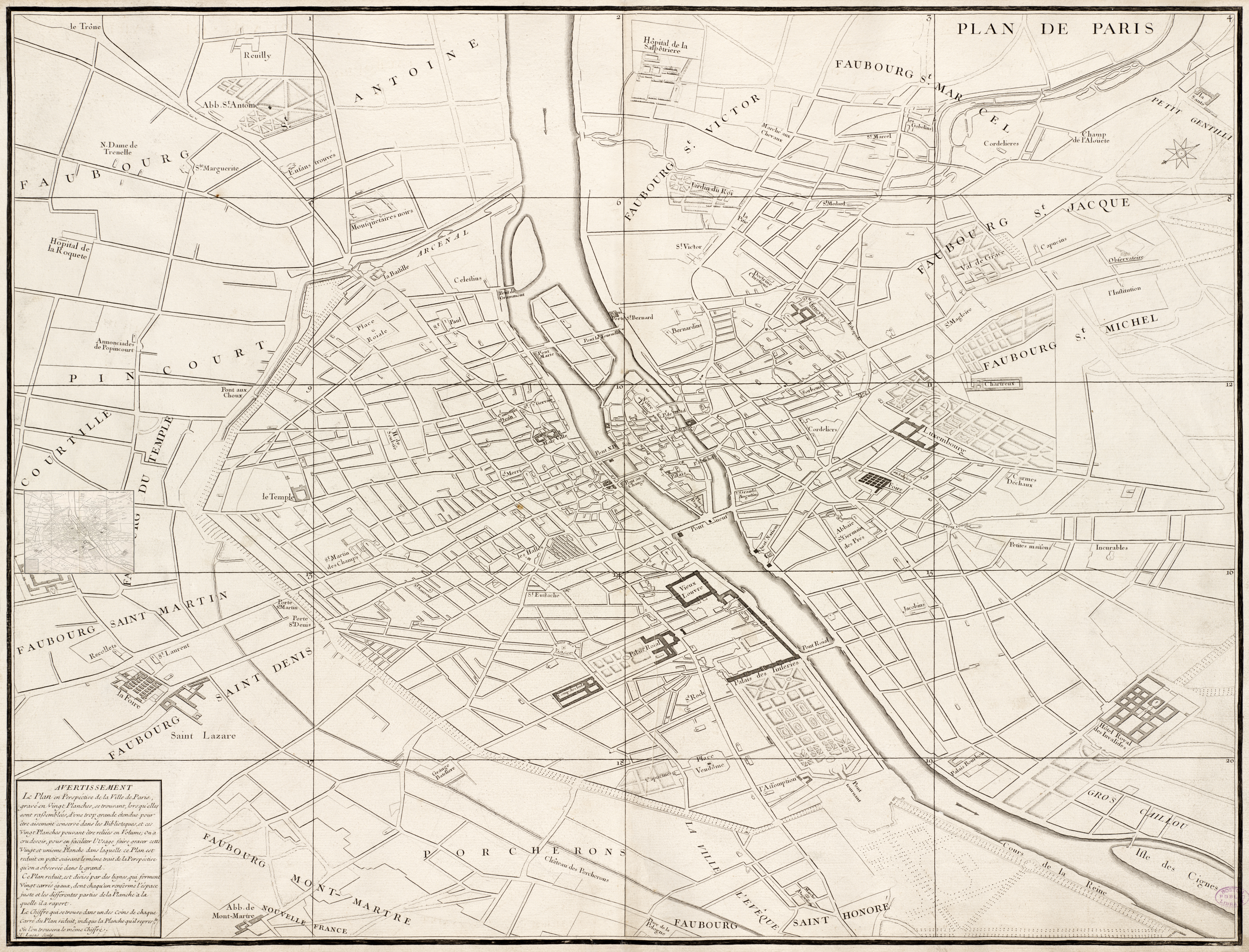
General overview map illustrating how the sheets of the complete map fit together

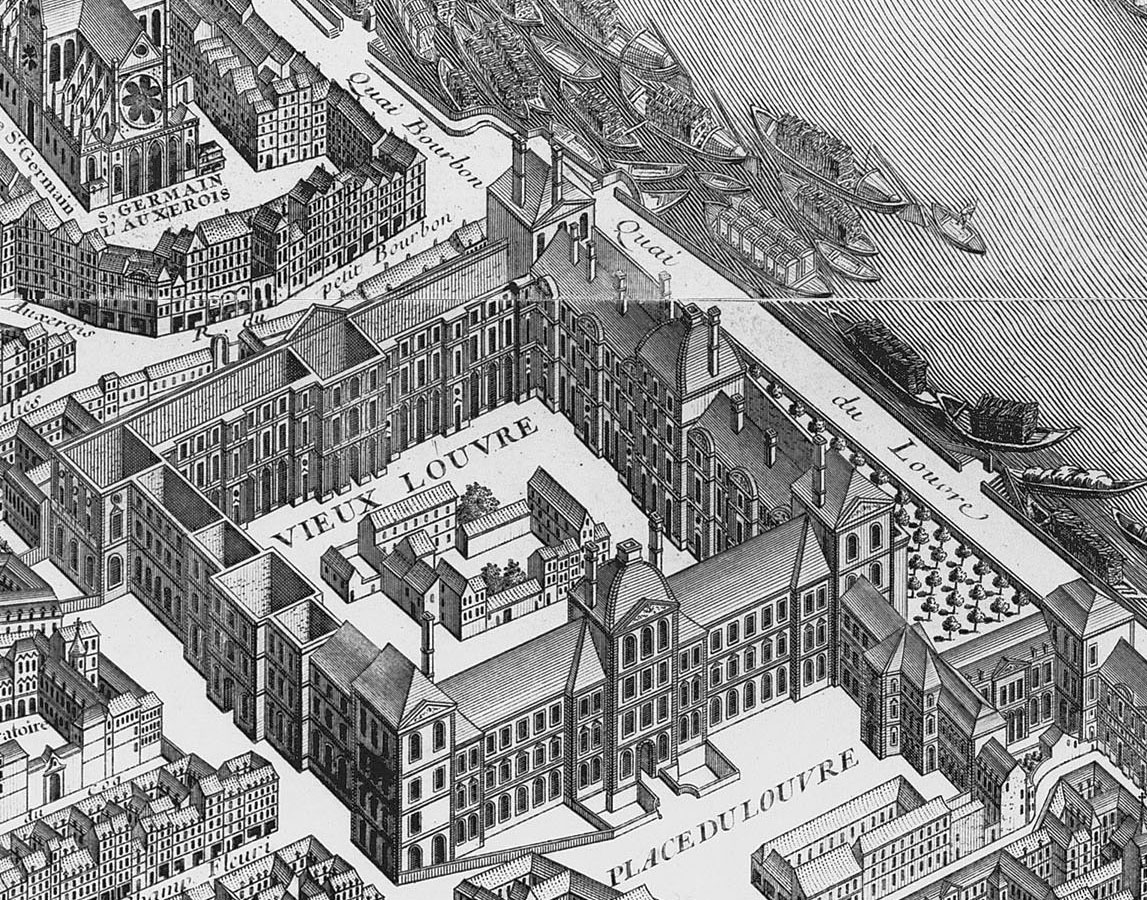
Detail from sheets 11 and 15, depicting the Louvre Palace

In 1734, Michel-Étienne Turgot, the chief of the municipality of Paris as provost of the city's merchants, decided to promote the reputation of Paris for Parisian, provincial, and foreign elites by commissioning a new map of the city. He asked Louis Bretez, a member of the Académie royale de peinture et de sculpture (Royal Academy of Painting and Sculpture) and professor of perspective, to draw up a map of Paris and its suburbs. By contract, Turgot requested a very faithful reproduction with great accuracy. Bretez was allowed to enter mansions, houses and gardens to take measurements and draw pictures, and worked on the project from 1734 to 1736.

The prevailing trend in the 18th century was to abandon portraits of cities (inherited from the Renaissance) for a more technical and mathematical geometric plan. The Turgot map goes against this trend by adopting the technique of perspective cavalière: two buildings of the same size are represented by two equally sized depictions, regardless of the distance between the buildings.

Claude Lucas, engraver to the Royal Academy of Sciences, created the twenty-one individual sheets in 1736. The map was published in 1739, and the prints were bound in volumes offered to King Louis XV, members of the Academy, and the municipality of Paris. Additional copies were to serve as representations of France to foreigners. The twenty-one original engraved brass plates are kept by the chalcography at the Louvre, where they are still used for printing, employing similar techniques to those used in the 18th century.

== See also ==
- Giambattista Nolli, who produced a contemporaneous map of Rome
- Cartography of France
- History of cartography
