= Nyhavn 53 =

Listed building in Copenhagen, Denmark

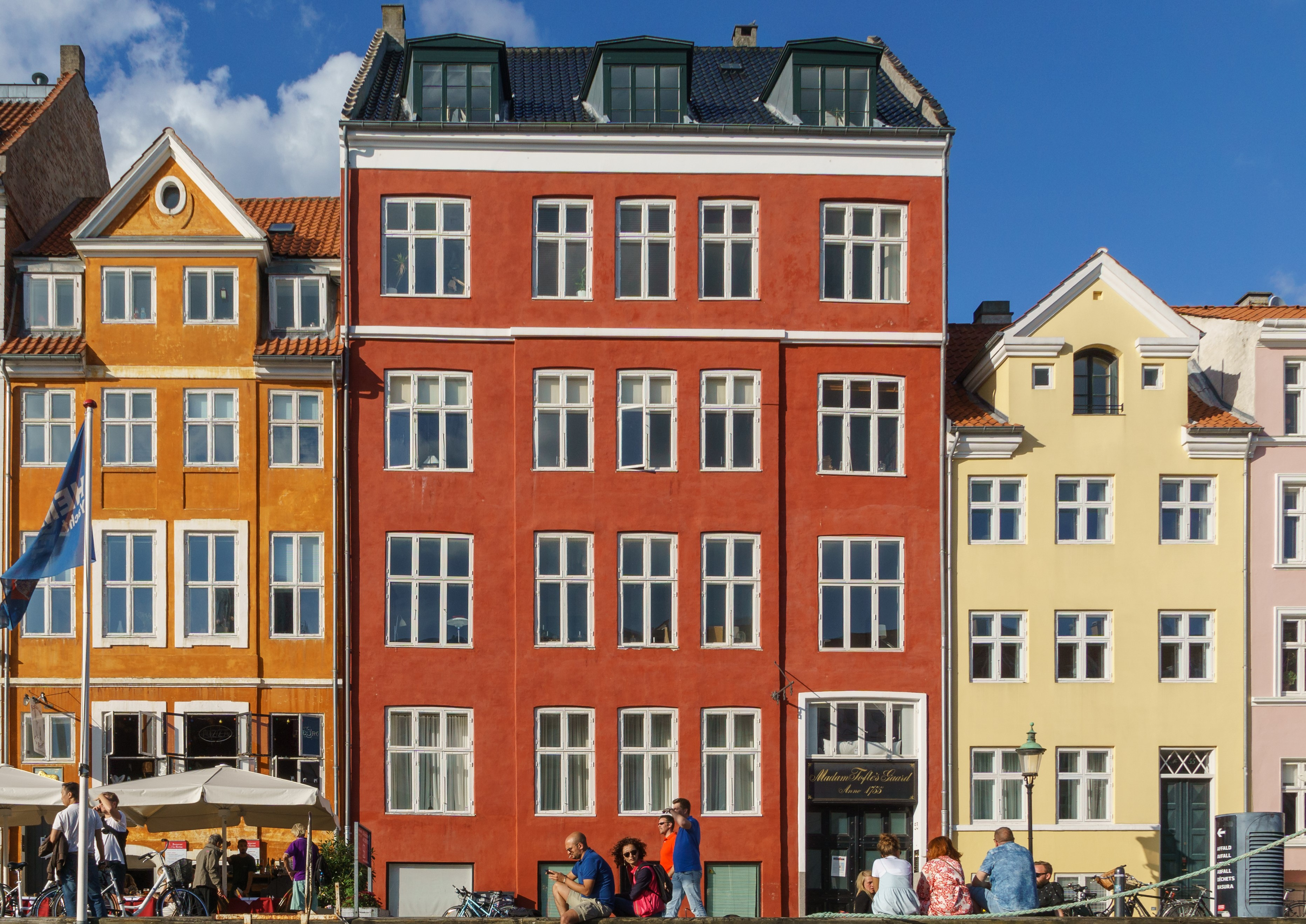

General information
- Location: Copenhagen, Denmark, Denmark
- Coordinates: 55°40′47.78″N 12°35′32.32″E
- Completed: 1755
- Renovated: 1874 (heightened)

Nyhavn 53, also known as Madame Tofte's House, is a residential building overlooking the Nyhavn canal in central Copenhagen, Denmark. It was constructed with three storeys in the 1750s but owes its current appearance to a renovation in the 1870s. It was listed in the Danish registry of protected buildings and places in 1932. Notable former residents include the composer Peter Arnold Heise and the ballet dancer Augusta Nielsen. The Adventurers' Club of Denmark is based in a half-timbered warehouse in the courtyard.

== History ==
=== Early history ===
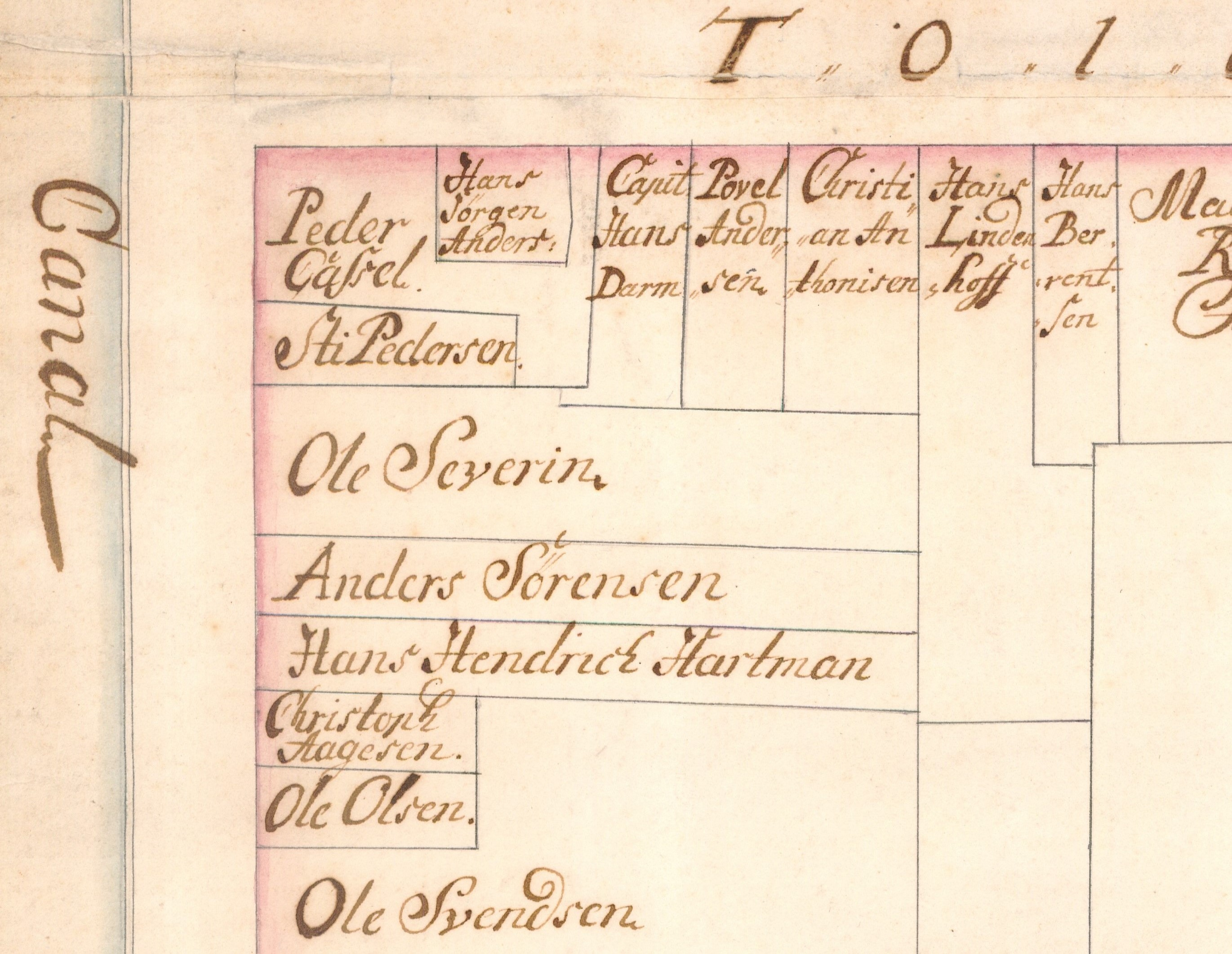
Ole Severin's property seen in a detail from a 1731 plan of the area

The property was listed in Copenhagen's first cadastre of 1689 as No. 17 in St. Ann's East Quarter. It was owned by one Peder Ebbesen at that time. By 1731, No. 16 belonged to Ole Severin.

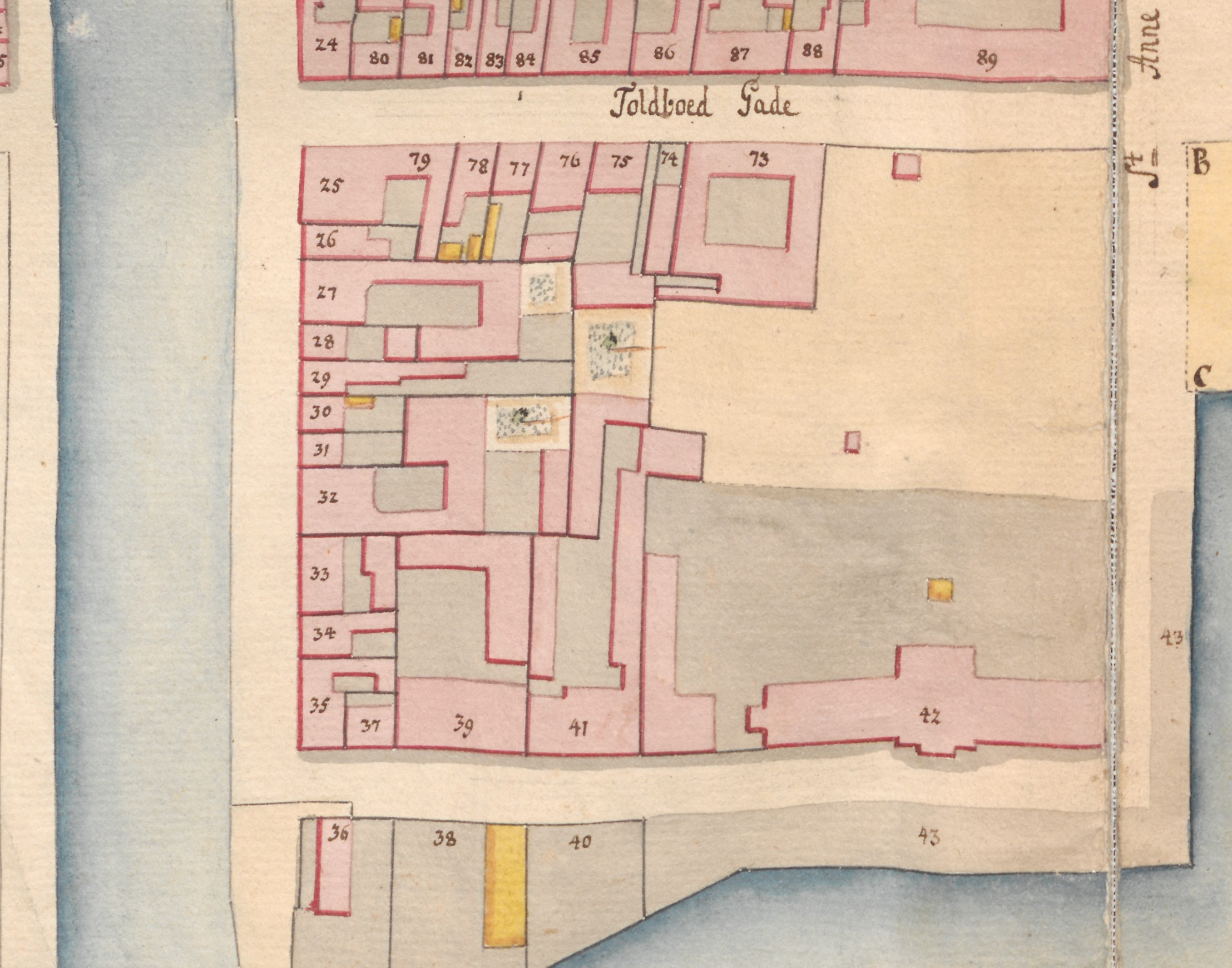
No. 27 seen in a detail from Christian Gedde's map of St. Ann's East Quarter, 1757

The property was later acquired by Hans Jacob Tofte. He was originally from Lolland. He was granted citizenship as a skipper in Copenhagen in 1735. The present building on the site was constructed for him in 1754–55. His property was listed in the new cadastre of 1756 as No. 27 in St. Ann's East Quarter. He died in the second half of the 1760s. The property was later owned by his widow (died c. 1783). During her ownership it was colloquially known as Madame Tofte's House, a name that stuck to it long after her death.

=== Jørgen Daniel Steenbeck ===
The property was home to 17 residents in four households at the time of the 1787 census. Jørgen Daniel Steenbeck, a sea captain, resided in the building with his wife Chatrine Haagens Datter, their two children (aged seven and nine) and two maids. Jens Nielsen Kornbeck (1763–1796), another sea captain, resided in the building with his wife Louise Haagensen (1761-), their two children (aged one and six) and two maids. Jørgen Jensen Fersløw, a mate (sturmand), resided in the building with his wife Anna Maria Ols Datter and one maid. Ole Christian Ravnkilde, a merchant, resided in the building with one employee.

The property was only home to three households at the 1801 census. Jørgen Daniel and Cathrine Steenbeck were still residing in one of the apartments. They lived there with their 20-year-old son Daniel, two maids and the former soldier Johan Christopher Westmand. Christian Madsen, another skipper, resided in the building with his wife Cecilie Poulsen, a 12-year-old girl in their care, the 61-year-old widow Maren Gad and two maids. Johan Gotlieb Steman, a barkeeper, resided in the building with his wife Marie Lemann and one maid.

=== Nisson/Selmer family ===
Nicolai Nisson, a skipper and wholesale merchant, purchased the property in 1802. In 1794, in partnership with his brother Erich, he had founded Nicolay Nisson & Co., a wholesale business dealing in colonial goods and ship supplies. On 13 June 1800, Nisson had married Marie Louise Selmer, whose father, Rasmus Sternberg Selmer, was one of the directors of the Danish Asiatic Company. During the Gunboat War, Nisson was issued letters of mark for at least 15 privateering vessels, including the schooners Caroline, Madame Clarke and Grev Danneskjold. Privateering became a successful enterprise for him. He and his wife had four children, one daughter and three sons.

Nicolay Nisson died just 45 years old on 11 April 1808. A year and a half later, on 14 September 1809, Marie Louise Nisson married her cousin, Carl Frederik Selmer, who then took charge of the business.

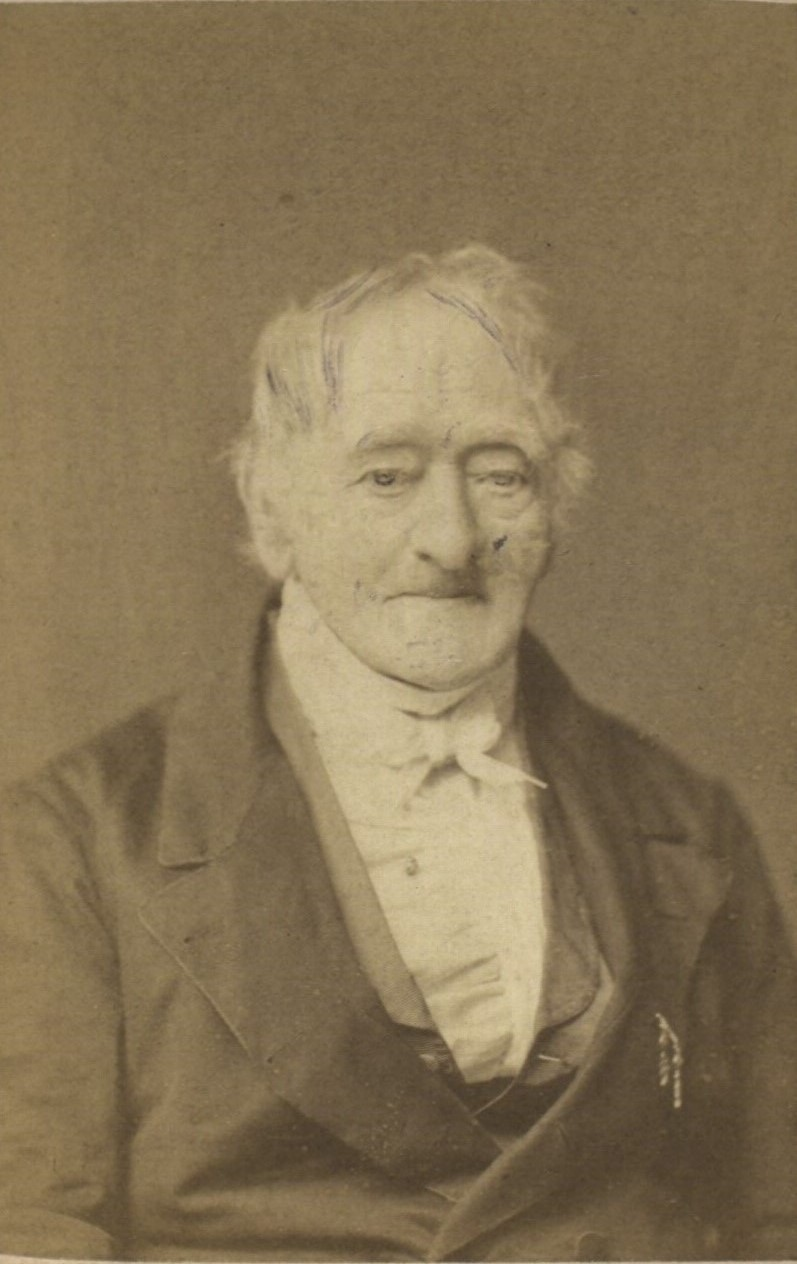
Carl Friderich Selmer

Selmer's property was home to two households at the 1834 census. Carl Frederik and Marie Lovise Selmer resided on the first floor with their 15-year-old son Axel Selmer, two male servants and one maid. Georg Ulrick Mathøe, a skipper, resided on the ground floor with his wife Karen Kirstine Mathøe, their four children (aged 13 to 27), one maid, merchant (grosserer) Hans Wilder and Wilder's two children (aged 18 and 22).

The company was later passed down to Nisson's eldest son, Erich Sternberg Nicolay Nisson (1803-1859). He resided on the second floor (with title of grocer/urtekræmmer) at the time of the 1840 census. He lived there with his wife Maren Nisson, their six children (aged one to 11), two grocers (employees), one male servant and two maids. Carl Frederik and Marie Louise Selmer resided on the first floor with three maids and Icelandic merchant Martin Christian Nisson. Georg Uldrick Christian Mathais was still residing on the ground floor. He lived there with three of his children (aged 19 to 24) and two maids.

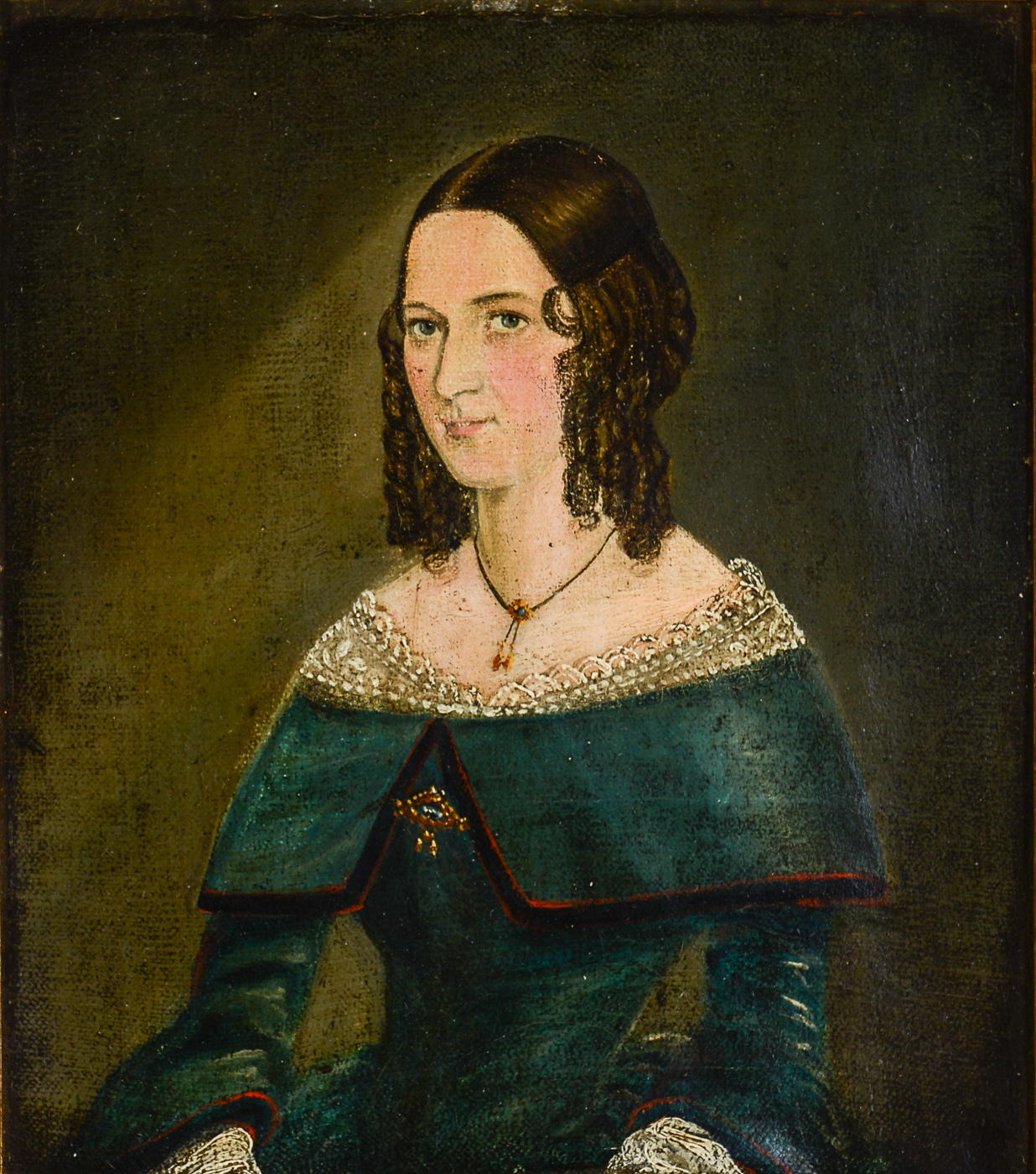
Augusta Nielsen

The property was home to four households at the 1850 census. Carl Fredeirk and Marie Louise Selmer resided on the first floor with a 63-year-old widow, one lodger, two male servants and one maid. William Timothe Fiedler, a senior clerk, resided on the ground floor with his wife Ana Cathrina Fiedler and one maid. Augusta Nielsen and Anders Johan Afzelius, a dancer at the Royal Danish Ballet and her Swedish husband, an engineer, resided on the second floor with one maid. Peter Frederik Wilhelm Hildebrand, a grocer (urtekræmmermester), resided in the basement with his apprentice Jacob Peter Johannes Munch and one maid.

The company was, after Erich Nisson's death, continued by his son Martin Nisson (1834-1901), It was under his management gradually transformed from a colonial goods wholesale business to a ship-chandler's business.

The composer Peter Arnold Heise was a resident of the building in 1958.

The property was home to four households at the 1860 census. Carl Frederik Selmer's household consisted of himself, his wife, their son, a housekeeper, a male servant and a maid. Johan Peter Lorentz Quade. a businessman and the brother of the owner of Nyhavn 55, resided on the ground floor with his wife Elisabeth Karoline Quade (née Valeur), their infant son and one maid. Henrik Frederik Martensen, a senior clerk in Selmer's trading firm, resided in the building with his wife Wilhelmine Henriette Martensen (née Krause), their three children (aged eight to 16), his sister-in-law Johanne Marie Krause, one lodger and one maid. Niels Jacob Edvard Hellesen and Henry von Aller, two merchant's apprentices (aged 16 and 19), resided in the last dwelling with one maid.

=== Later history ===
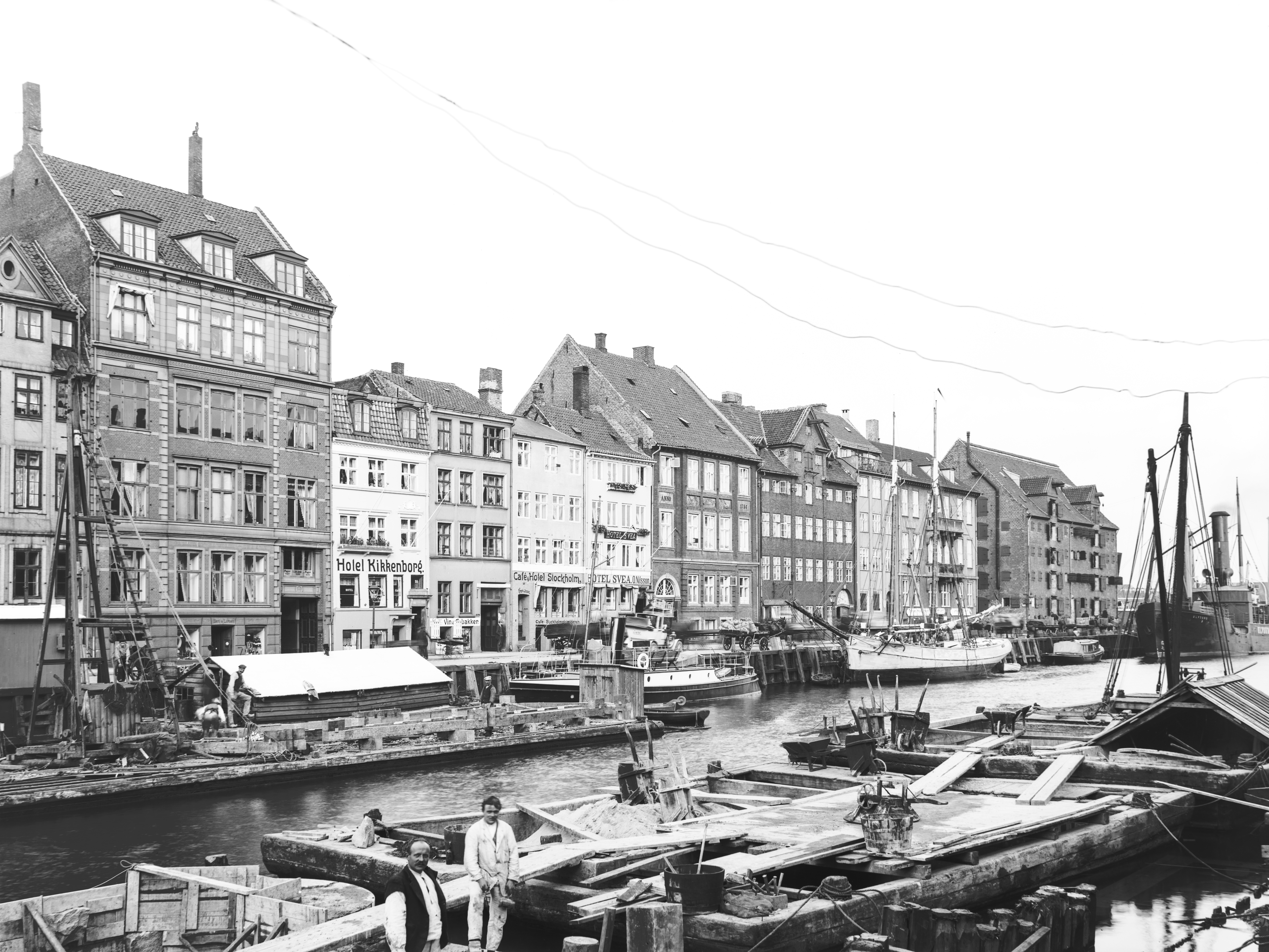
Nyhavn 53 seen furthest to the left in photograph by Johannes Hauerslev

The building was heightened with one storey by master mason J. N. Schiøldan in 1874–75.

The property was home to 35 residents at the 1880 census. Martin Christian Nissen and Sophie Maria Nissen resided on the ground floor with their three children (aged 10 to 17), two maids and four male servants. Christian Theodor Kastrup, another businessman (grosserer), resided on the first floor with his wife Flora Marie Kastrup, their two children (aged 24 and 26) and two maids. Hans Johannes Rønne, a third businessman (grosserer), resided on the second floor with his wife Thora Marie Rønne, their three children (aged 15 to 24) and one maid. Oskar Axel Viggo Tegesis, fourth businessman (grosserer), resided on the third floor with his wife Elisabeth Jutte Fritze Tegesis, two maids and one lodger. Laura, Louise and Theophilus Scholdann–three siblings in their 30s–resided in the garret with their aunt Christiane Scholdann, two lodgers and a maid.

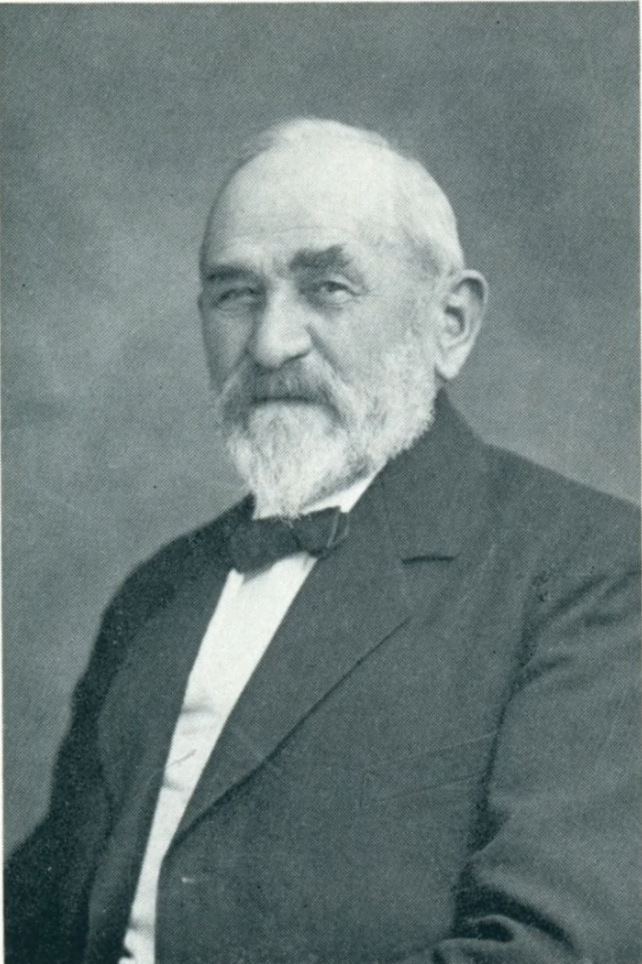
Valdemar Larsen

Nicolay Nisson & Co. was after Martin Nisson's death passed to the employees H.J. Berg (1868-1910) and Valdemar Larsen (1850-1925). Larsen was the sole owner of the company after Berg's death in 1910. The firm was based in the building until at least 1950.

Bank manager Bernhard Friehling resided in one of the apartments from 1892.

The property was before 1908 acquired by the businessman (grosserer) Carl Christian Richter (1847-1826). He was married to Francisca Frederikke Smith (1844-), daughter of the owner of Esrom Mill Gottlieb Frederik Fransciscus Smith and Clausine (Lissi) Frederikke Duncan. His wholesale company Ed. Ticther was based in the building until at least 1950. The company was founded by his father Eduard Julius Richter (1813-1892) in 1852. Christian and his brother Adam Christian Richter became partners in 1883.

Lauritz Toft placed the warehouse at Nyhavn 53B at the disposal of the Adventurers' Club of Denmark. Another member of the club, writer and diver Ylrich Uhre, was subsequently in charge of a major renovation of the building.

== Architecture ==
Nyhavn 53 is constructed in brick with four storeys over a walk-out basement. The five-bays-long facade has a three-bay median risalit flanked by two wider lateral bays. It is plastered and red-painted, with white-painted window frames and other details. The cornice band above the third floor bears testament to the fact that the fourth floor was added later, namely at the 1874 renovation. A gate in the bay farthest to the right opens to a narrow courtyard on the rear. The walls of the gateway feature four plaster copies of Bertel Thorvaldsen's relief's of "The Four Seasons". The rear side of the building features and outwardly curved bay followed by a two-bay connector which is again, via a canted bay, attached to a wider, five-bays-long side wing. The roof is clad with black tile towards the street and red tile towards the yard.

Two half-timbered warehouses are located in the courtyard. One of them has a two-storey gabled wall dormer.

== Today ==
The property is today owned by E/F Nyhavn 53. It contains a single condominium on each floor. The Adventurers' Club of Denmark is based in the warehouse at Nyhavn 53B.
