= Kompagnistræde 32 =

Neoclassical property in Copenhagen, Denmark

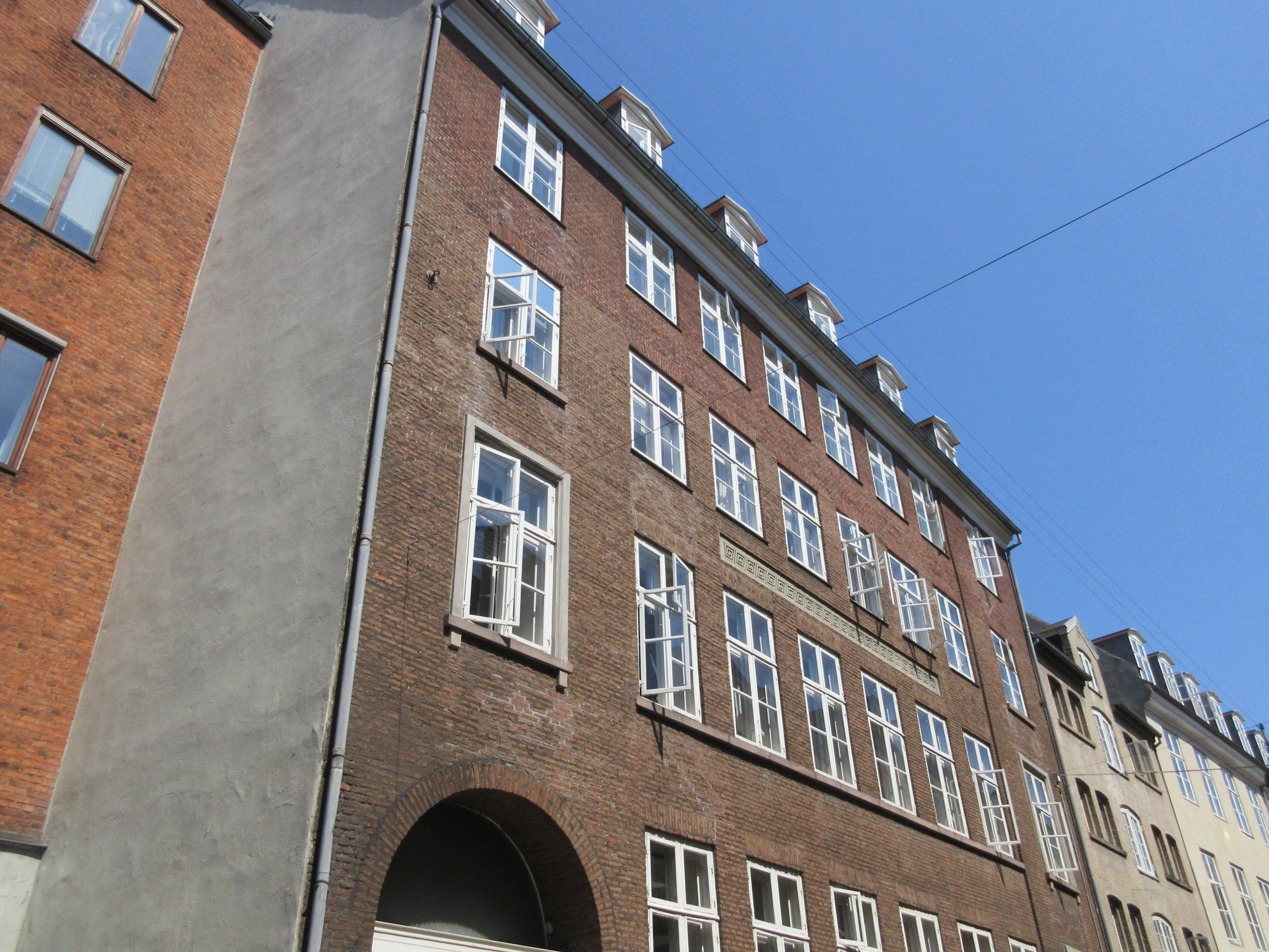
- Interactive map of the Kompagnistræde 32 area

General information
- Architectural style: Neoclassical
- Location: Copenhagen, Denmark
- Coordinates: 55°40′35.36″N 12°34′25.14″E
- Completed: 1799
- Renovated: 1846 (heightened)
- Client: Danish Union of Teachers

Design and construction
- Architect: Andreas Hallander

Kompagnistræde 32 is a Neoclassical property in central Copenhagen, Denmark. The building was designed by architect Andreas Hallander. In 1799, it featured three storeys above a walk-out basement. An additional storey was added in 1846. A brewery operated in the building’s rear wing until at least the 1860s.

In 1968, the building was listed in the Danish Registry of Protected Buildings and Places. However, the neighboring warehouse (Kompagnistræde 30) and the rear wings are not part of the heritage listing.

The Danish Union of Teachers was formerly headquartered in the building from 1957 until relocating their headquarters to Vandkunsten 12. The union continues to own the building and rents it out as office space.

== History ==
=== 18th century ===
The site comprised two separate properties in the late 17th century. In 1689, the easternmost property was listed in Copenhagen's first cadastre as No. 17 in the city's West Quarter (Vester Kvarter), owned by skipper Ole Jensen. The western property was listed as No. 18 and belonged to Margrethe Simonsen. In the 1756 cadastre, the former No. 17 (the easternmost property) was listed as No. 16. It belonged to shoemaker Stig Pedersen, while No. 18 (the western property) was listed as No. 17 and belonged to brewer Jochum Friderich Buus.

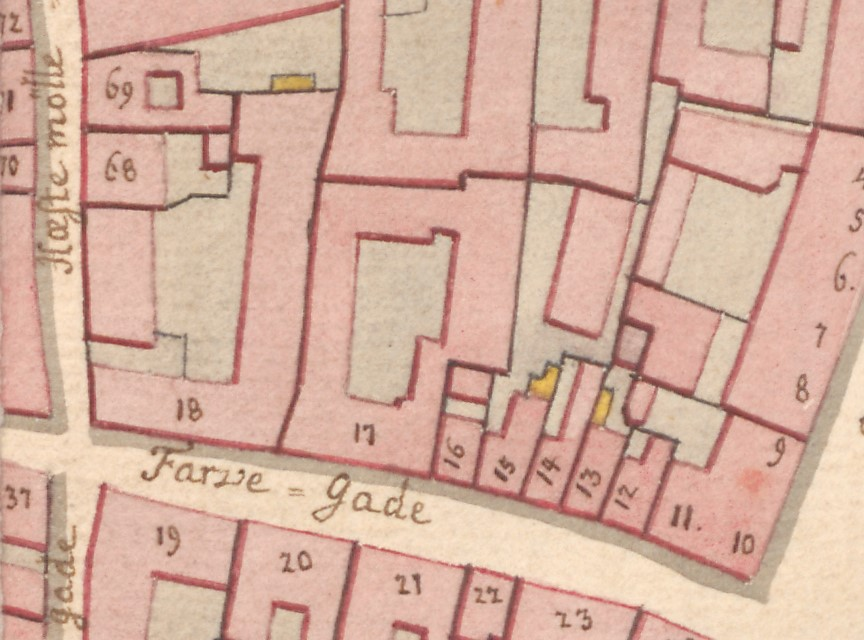
No. 16 and No. 17 are on Christian Gedde's map of Copenhagen's West Quarter, 1757.

By the time of the 1787 census, No. 16 contained five households, while No. 17 contained four.

=== Frederik Borchsenius and the new building ===
No. 16 and No. 17 were destroyed in the Copenhagen Fire of 1795, along with most other buildings in the area. The two sites were subsequently acquired by Frederik Borchsenius and merged them into a single property. The current building on the site was constructed in 1799. On the 5th August 1799, Borchsenius was granted citizenship as a brewer in Copenhagen and established a brewery in the rear wing of his new property.

Frederik Borchsenius was the son of Johannes Borchsenius, a former owner of Ødemark Manor in Sorø (from 1771 to 1783). He himself had leased Juellund from 1792 to 1796. He married Bodil Malling (1762–1842) on the 14th September 1792. Her late husband, Mathias Nielsen Lange (1754–1791), had preceded him as the tenant manager (forpagter) of the Juellund estate. Borchsenius had later also leased Bækkeskov from Charles August Selby in 1797.

During the 1801 census, Borchsenius' property housed 40 residents in six households. Borchsenius himself resided on the ground floor with his family, two maids, two brewery workers, and a caretaker. Andreas Sevald Holck, a retired brewer and former owner of the brewery across the street, also lived in the building with his wife.

In 1806, the property was listed in the new cadastre as No. 121 in the West Quarter.

=== Jens and Anders Pandrup's brewery ===
At the time of the 1840 census, No. 121 housed six households. Jens Andersen Pandrup, a new brewer, resided on the ground floor with his wife, their two children, six employees, two maids, and two lodgers. He and his family would continue to live there until at least 1850.

In 1850, Oline Laurine Brahde (1804–1888), widow of Johan Frederik Brahde (1799–1846), former landfoged on Saint Jan in the Danish West Indies, resided on the third floor with her five children (aged three to 18), a maid, and lodger Jens Frederik Løwen.

Pandrup's brewery was later passed to his son Anders. At the time of the 1860 census, he resided on the ground floor with his wife, their three children, two maids, and four male employees. Ane Marie Pandrup, Pandrup's widow, was living among the residents of the building, but is listed in the census records together with a maid as a separate household.

=== 20th century ===
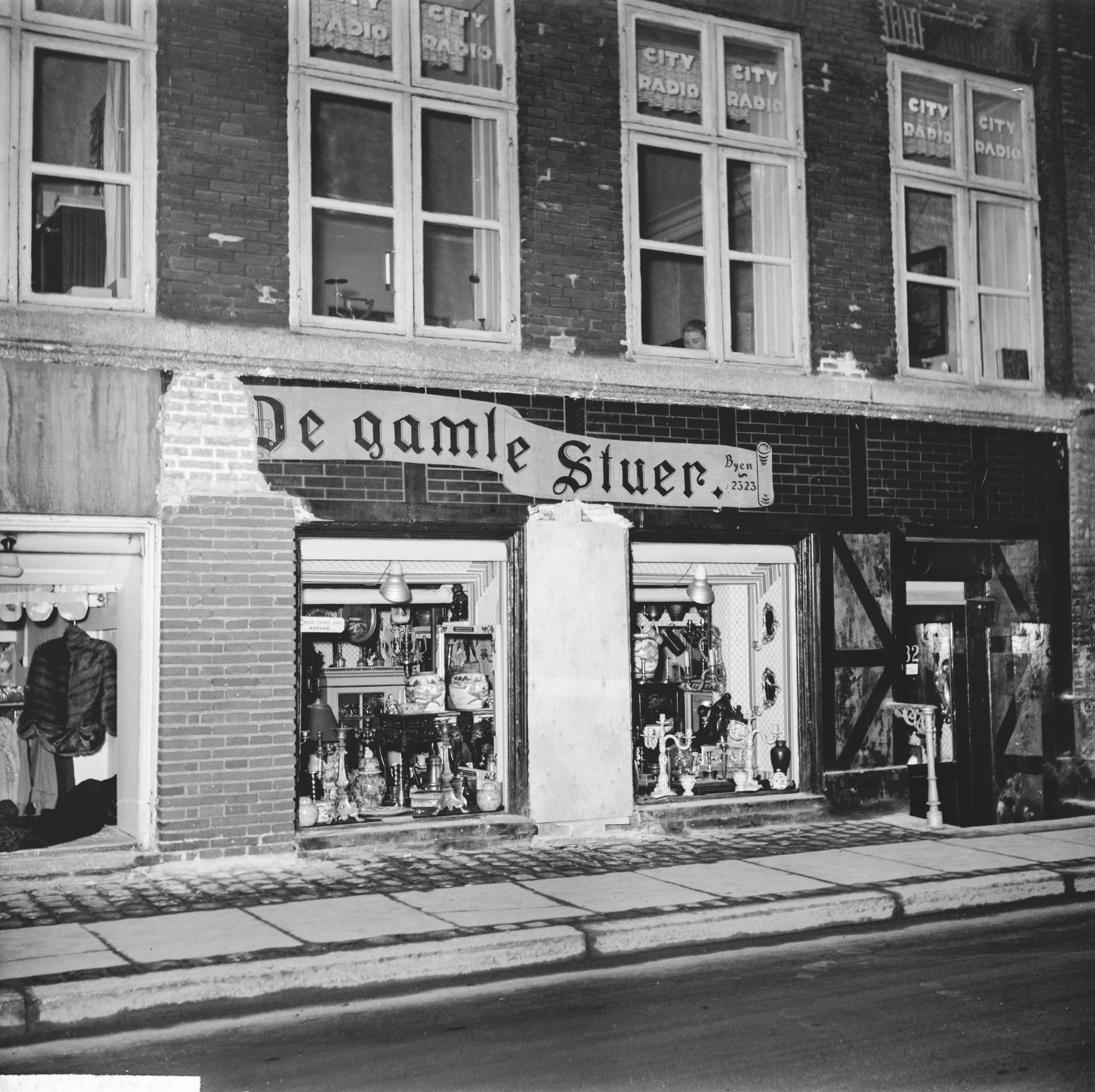
Kompagnistræde 32 in 1957

J. P. Quaade & Søn was a wholesale company based in the building from some time after 1919.

The businessmen Frederik Wernerson, Ferdinand Andersen, and Carl C. Larsen were among the residents in 1919.

In 1957, Kompagnistræde 32 was acquired by the Danish Union of Teachers. In 1991, Kompagnistræde 32 was merged with Rådhusstræde 6. Kompagnistræde 32 was renovated by Mogens Didriksen (1918–1991) and K. E. Sand Kirk (born 1922) in 1959. Their work received an award from City Hall the following year.

== Architecture ==
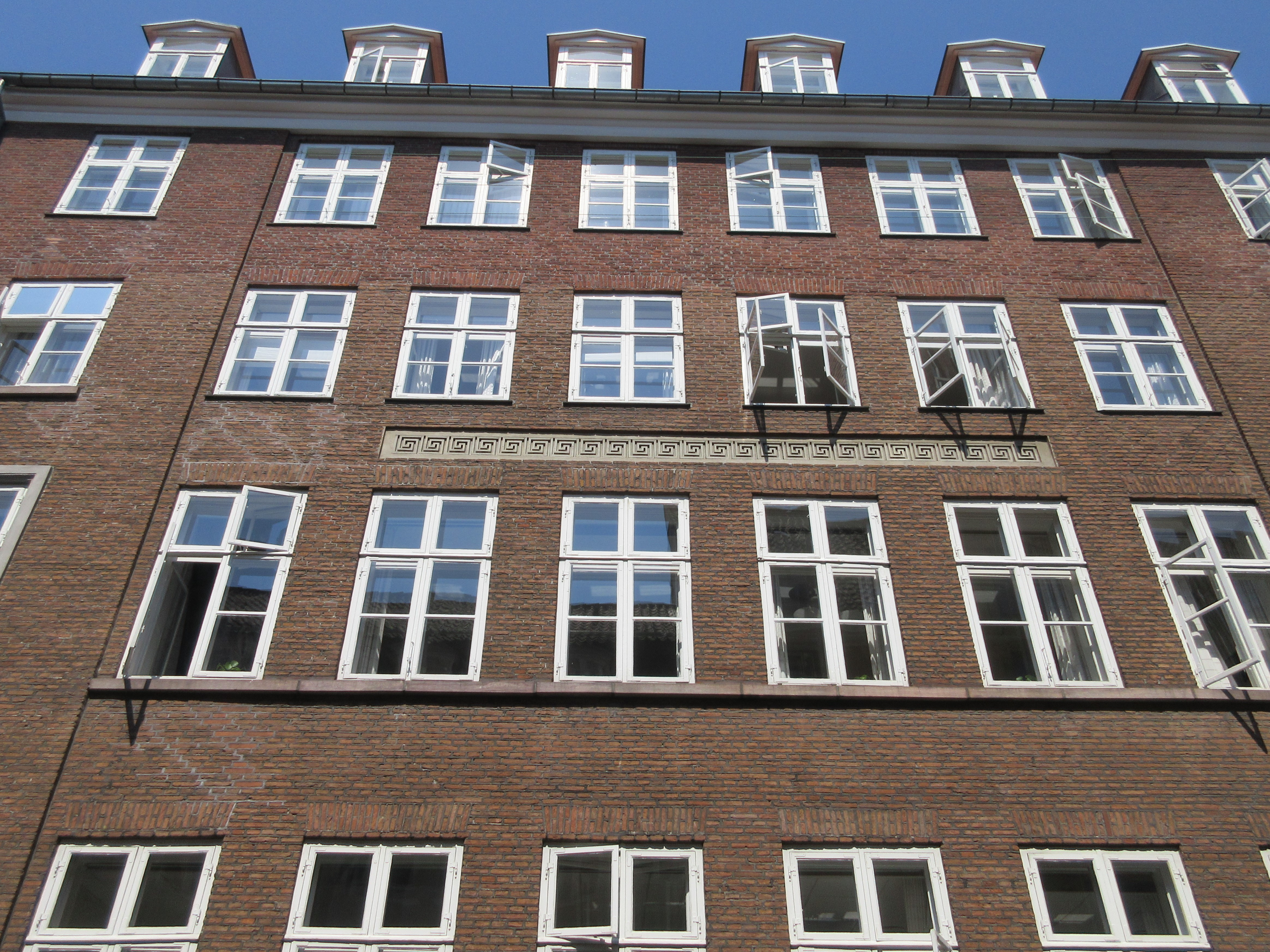
Detail of the façade.

Kompagnistræde 32 was constructed by Andreas Hallander with three storeys over a walk-out basement. An additional storey was added in 1846. The building is eight bays wide. The two outer bays are wider than the six slightly recessed central ones. The façade features several decorative elements: sandstone sill bands run beneath the six central windows on both the ground and first floors, a Greek key frieze separates the four central windows between the first and second floors, and a cornice adorns the area just below the roof. An arched gate is located in the bay furthest to the left, and the main entrance to the building is located in the interior wall of the gateway. A basement entrance is located in the bay furthest to the right. The red tile roof features six dormer windows facing the street and two dormer windows facing the yard.

== Today ==
As of 2008, the property is owned by the Danish Union of Teachers (Danmarks Lærerforening). The building is leased as office space and has a total floor area of 4,232 square meters distributed among 16 individual leases.
