= Morten Farum House =

Building in Copenhagen

- Morten Farums Gård
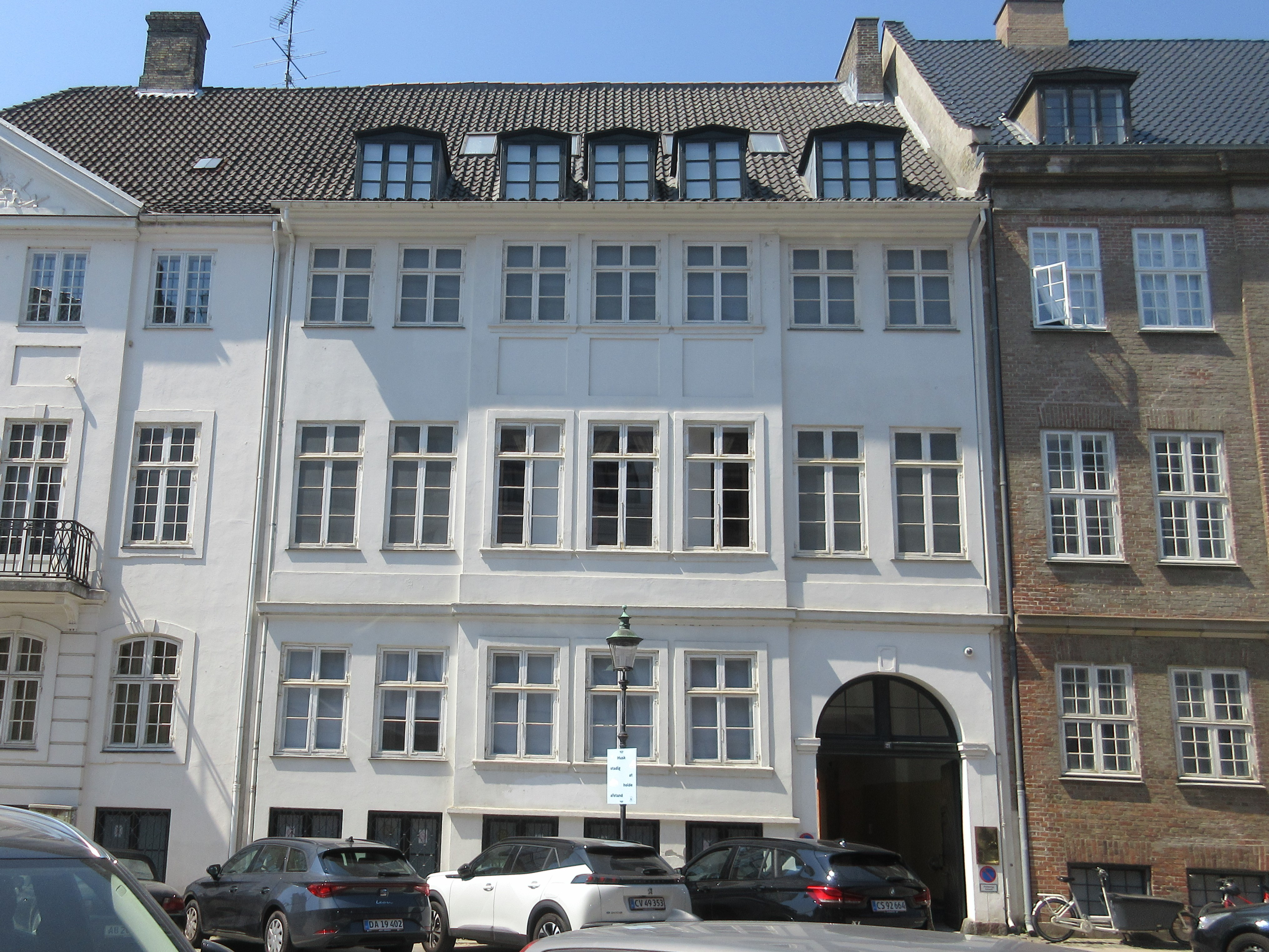
- Interactive map of the Morten Farum House area

General information
- Location: Copenhagen, Denmark
- Coordinates: 55°41′6.94″N 12°35′36.46″E
- Completed: 1755

Design and construction
- Architect: Nicolai Eigtved

The Morten Farum House (Danish: Morten Farums Gård), situated at Amaliegade 21A, is a former 18th-century town house dating from the early years of the Frederiksstaden district of central Copenhagen, Denmark. Its original Baroque style architecture by Nicolai Eigtved—who had also created the masterplan for the district—has later been compromised by the addition of a third storey. A complex of buildings on its rear, consisting of two parallel rear wings and a 10 bays long perpendicular side wing, all of which are yellow-washed with brown-painted timber framing, was listed on the Danish registry of protected buildings and places in 1918.

== History ==
=== 17th century ===
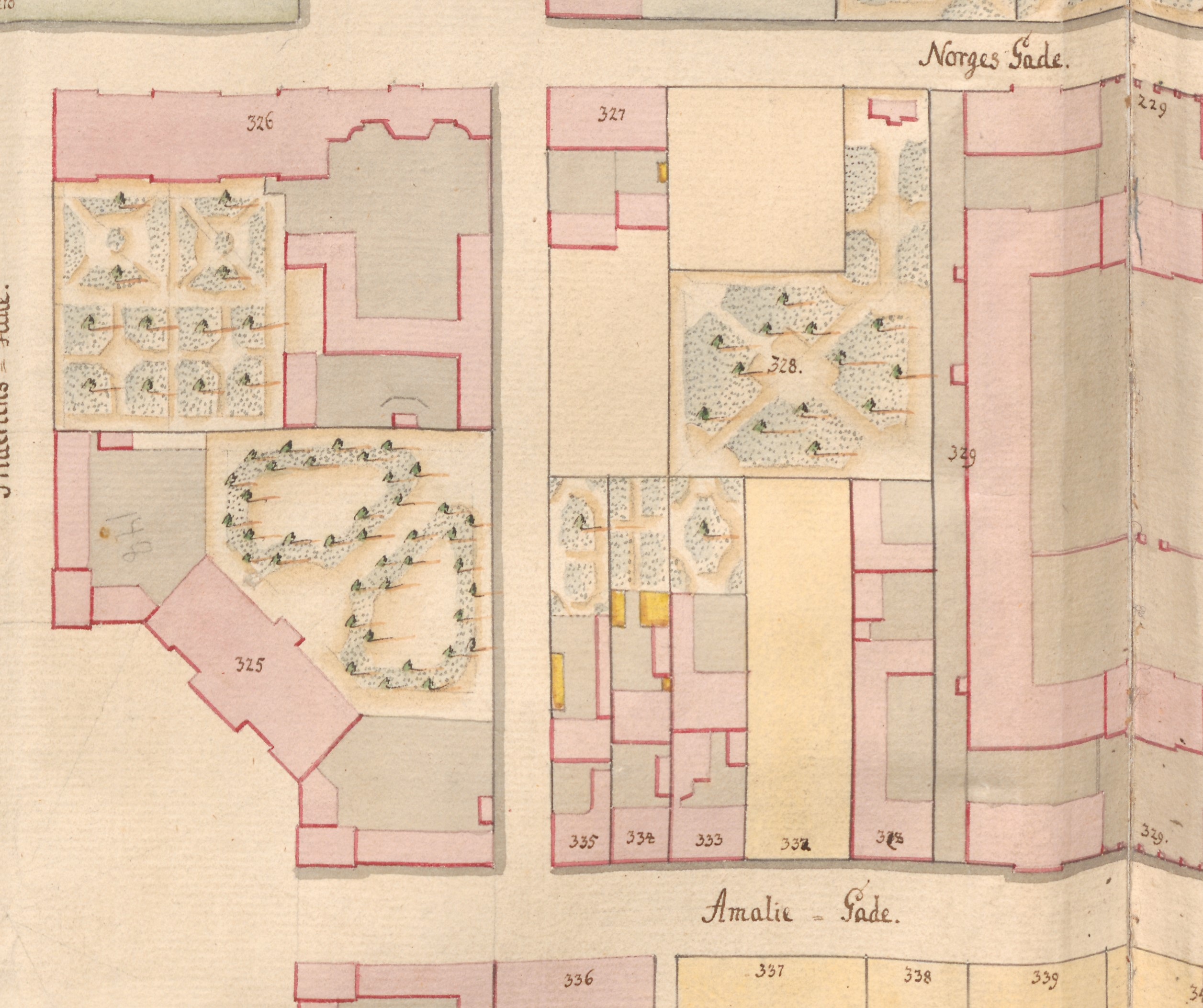
No. 334 seen on a detail from Christian Gedde's map of St. Ann's East Quarter, 1757.

When Frederiksstaden was founded in 1750, it was initially envisioned as a district for the nobility and the city's most wealthy merchants. It soon proved difficult to sell the lots and some of them were therefore sold to well-to-do craftsmen. One of these, Morten Farum, a klein smith, purchased the lot at the corner of Amaliegade and Fredericiagade (now Amaliegade No. 21). Christian Frederik von Levetzau, who had recently started the construction of one of the four Amalienborg mansions (now Christian VIII's Palace, found his new neighbor "unsuitable", and therefore lodged a complaint to the king. The situation was solved by moving Morten Farum a little further down the street to what is now No. 21A.

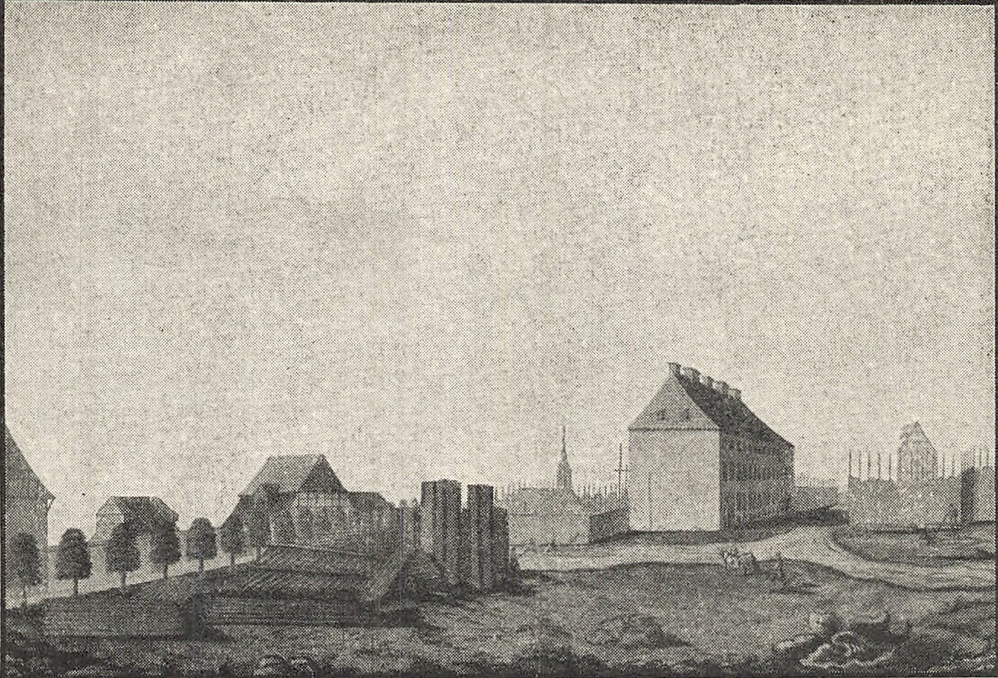
Morten Farum's rear wing seen to the left in a drawing from 1751, The larger building to the right is the Niels Aagesen House on the other side of the street.

Morten Farum started out by constructing a rear wing on his new property in 1751. It was in 1754-1755 finally followed by a more stately building towards the street built to designs by Nicolai Eigtved (1701-1754). Farum's property was listed in the new cadastre of 1756 as No. 71 CC. It was marked on Christian Gedde's 1757 cadastral map of St. Ann's East Quarter as No. 334.

It was acquired by ship captain Friedrich Christian Bentzen.

=== 19th century ===
The property was listed in the new cadastre of 1806 as No. 146 in St. Ann's East Quarter. It was owned by commissioner Peter Baron at that time.

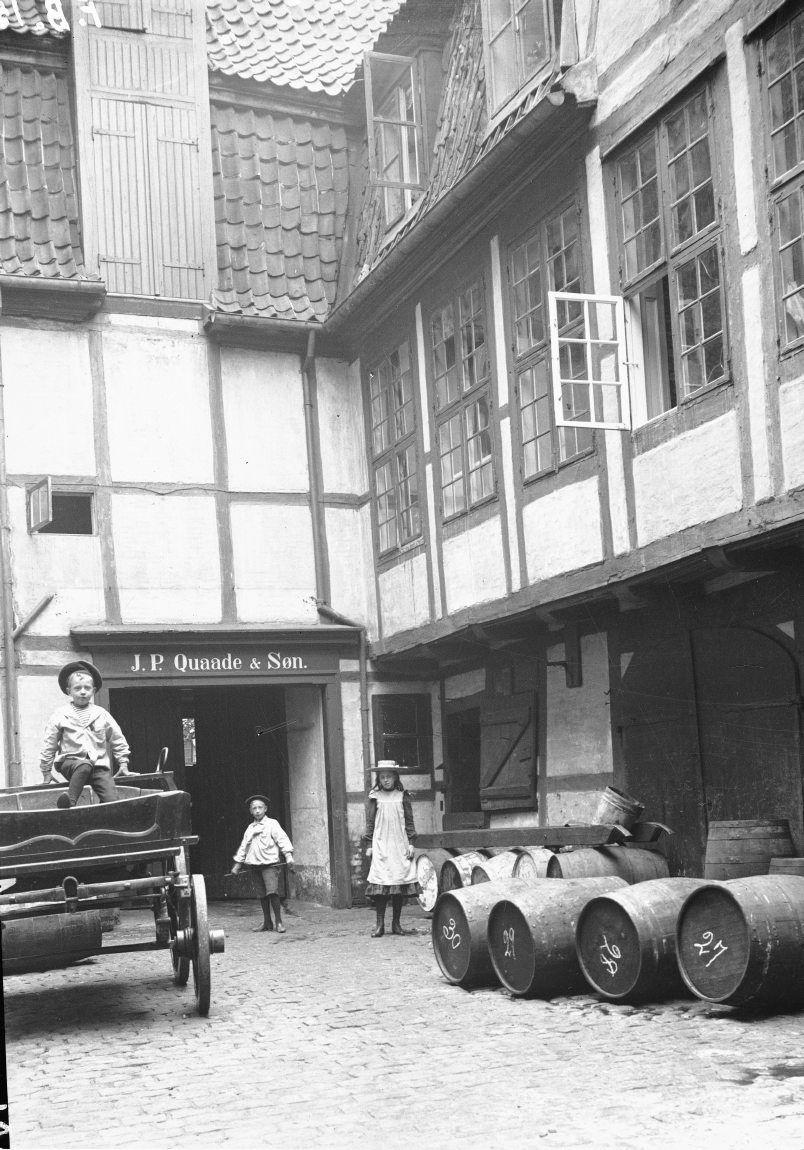
J.P. Quaade & Søn

The wholesale company J. P. Quaade & Søn was in the late 19th and early 20th century based in the building. Johan Peter Lorenz Quaade (1827–1889) had in 1856 taken over his uncle Johan Didrich Quaade's trading house at Nyhavn 55. In 1864, he partnered with N. C. Krake under the name J. P. Quaade & Krake. The company traded in grain and colonial goods as well as whale oil and other products from Greenland, Iceland and the Faroe Islands. In 1882, Krake left the company. In 1886, Quade's son Christian Veleur Quaade (born 1860) was made a partner in the firm which from then on traded as J. P. Quaade & Søn. It was for a while based at Sankt Annæ Plads 12 before landing at Amaliegade 21. It was after Christian Quaade's death in 1919 by a new owner moved to Kompagnistræde 32 but closed a few years later.

The lawyer August Goll (1866-1936) resided in the ground storey and first storey of No. 21 C from 1928 to 1932.

== Architecture ==
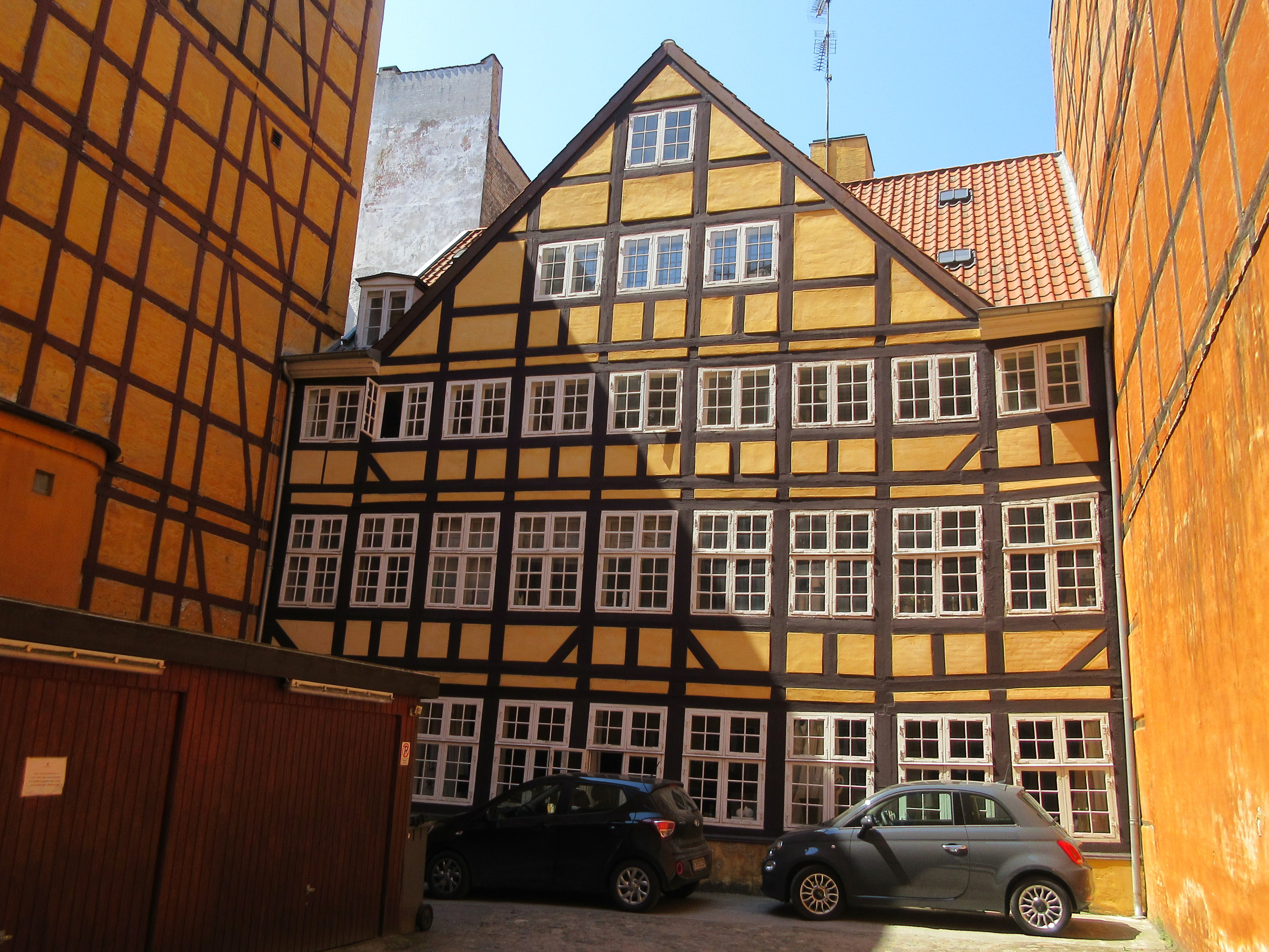
The first rear wing

Eigtved's original Baroque design of the town house fronting the street has been compromised by the addition of a full fourth storey. A gateway in the right-hand side of the building opens to the courtyard.

The buildings in the courtyard are all yellow-washed with brown-painted timber framing. The first of the two parallel rear wings (1751) is a three-storey, nine-bays-wide building with a seven-bay wall dormer. The roof is clad with red tiles. A two-bay gateway in the left-hand side of the building provides access to the second courtyard.

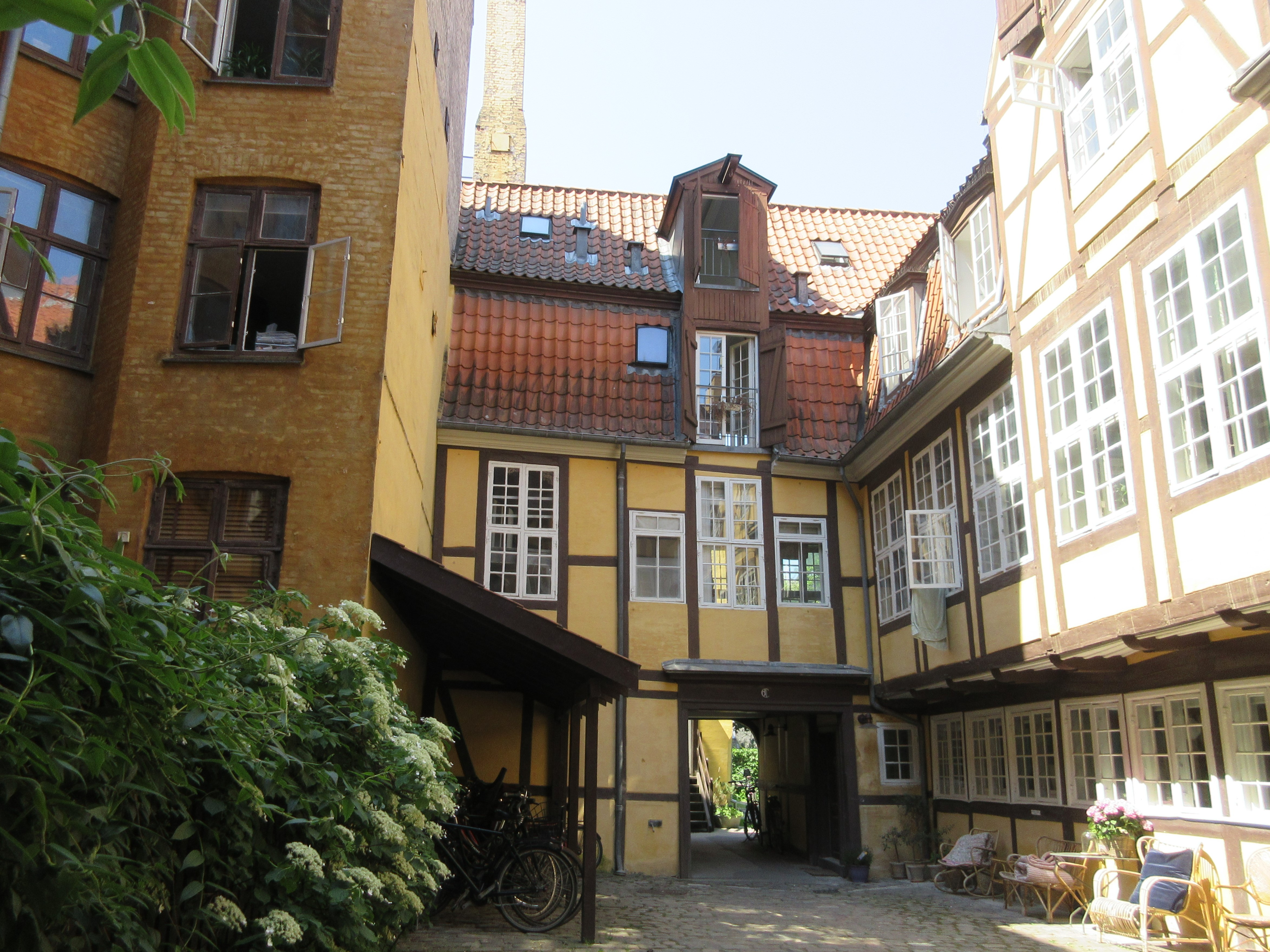
The second rear wing and part of the perpendicular wing to the right.

The second rear wing (1785) is seven bays wide and consists of two full storeys and a Mansard roof. The Mansard roof features a dormer with the remains of a pulley. The two rear wings are connected by a 10-bays-long, two-storey perpendicular wing (1785), with a first-storey cantilever, along the northern margin of the second courtyard. Its Mansard roof features a wall dormer with the remains of a houst. Two narrow, chambered bays connects the side wing to the first rear wing.

== Gallery ==
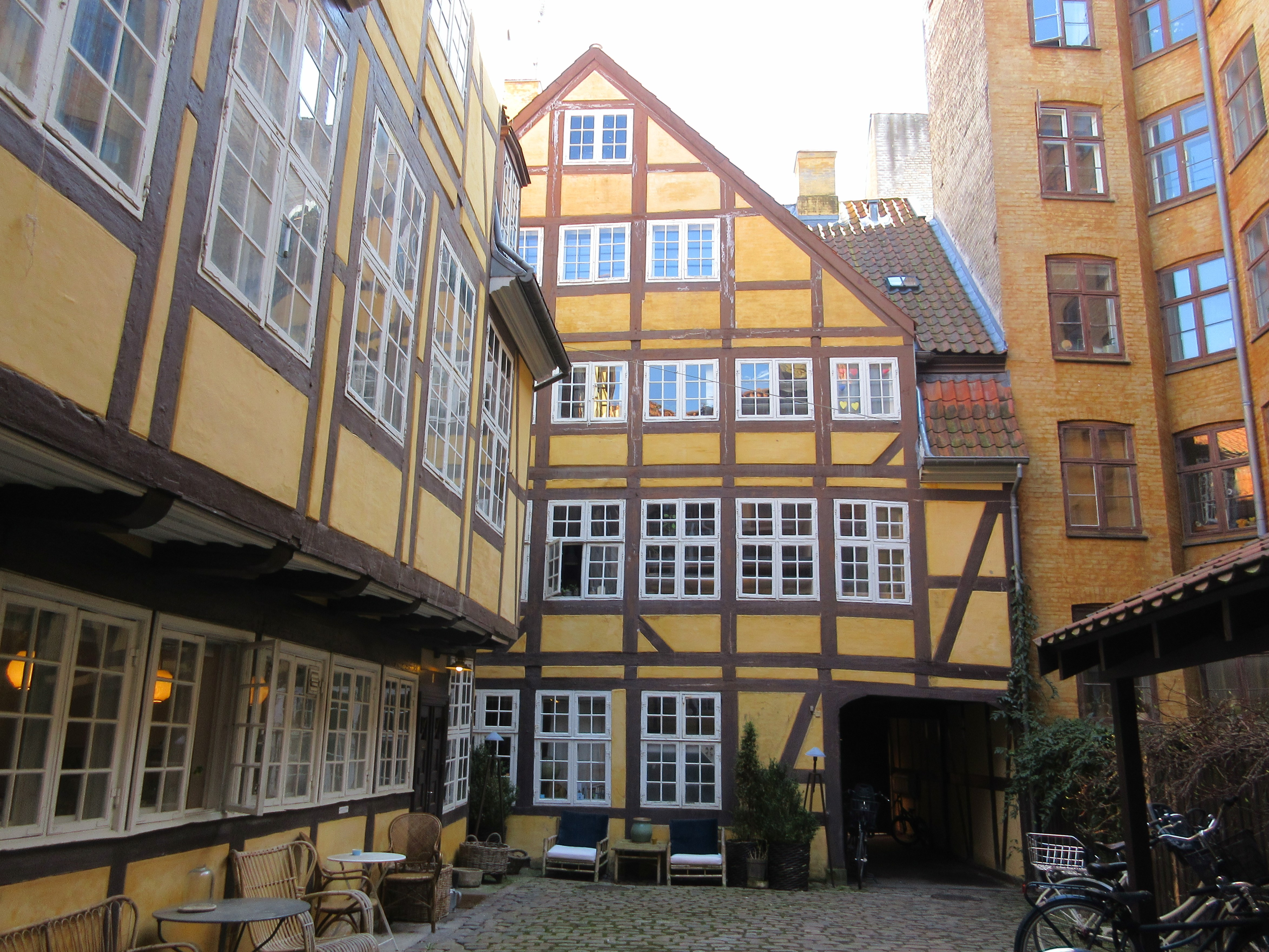
The rear side of the first rear wing and part of the perpendicular wing to the left
