= Nyhavn 55 =

Building in Copenhagen

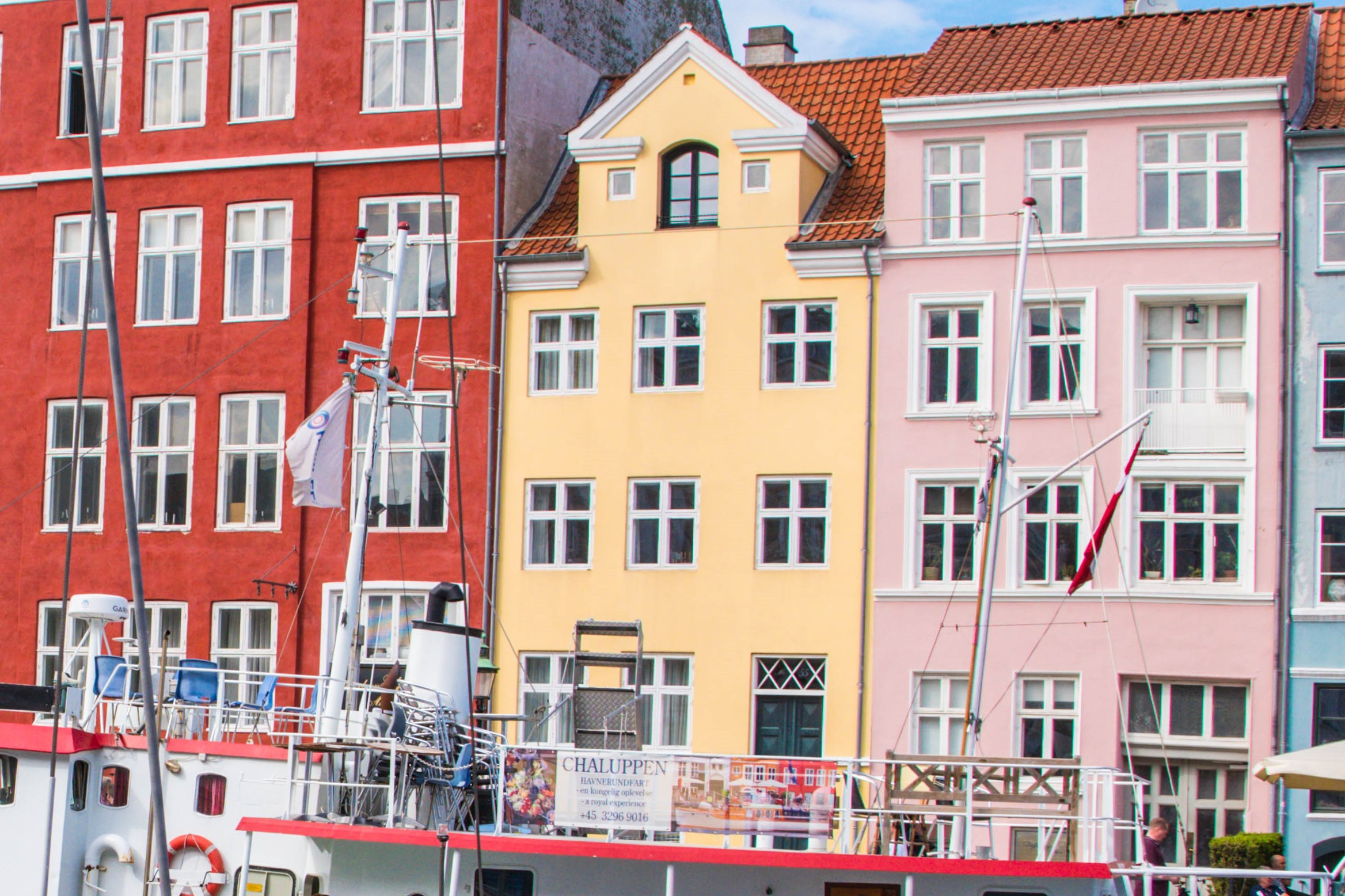
- Interactive map of the Nyhavn 55 area

General information
- Location: Copenhagen, Denmark
- Coordinates: 55°40′46.99″N 12°35′31.67″E
- Completed: c. 1731

Design and construction
- Architect: Nicolai Eigtved

Nyhavn 55 is a just three-bays-wide, 18th-century canal house overlooking the Nyhavn Canal in central Copenhagen, Denmark. The building was listed in the Danish registry of protected buildings and places in 1918. The heritage listing comprises a half-timbered perpendicular side wing on its rear.

== History ==
=== 18th and early 19th centuries ===
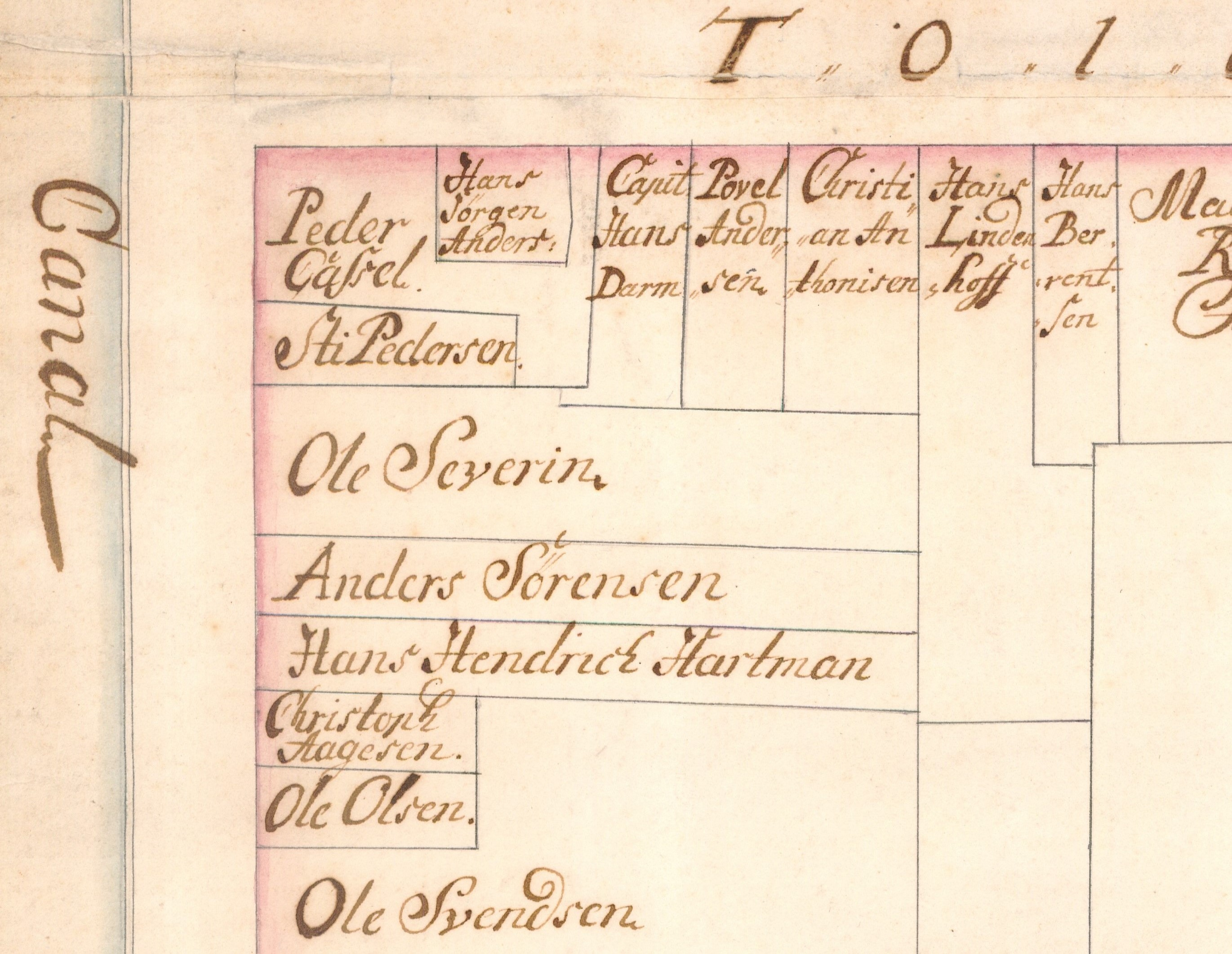
Anders S'rensen's property seen in a detail from a 1731 plan of the area

The property was listed in Copenhagen's first cadastre of 1689 listed as No. 18 in St. Ann's East Quarter (Sankt Annæ Øster Kvarter), owned by Borcherner Sørensen. The building fronting the canal was constructed before 1731. It belonged to one Anders Sørensen at that time.

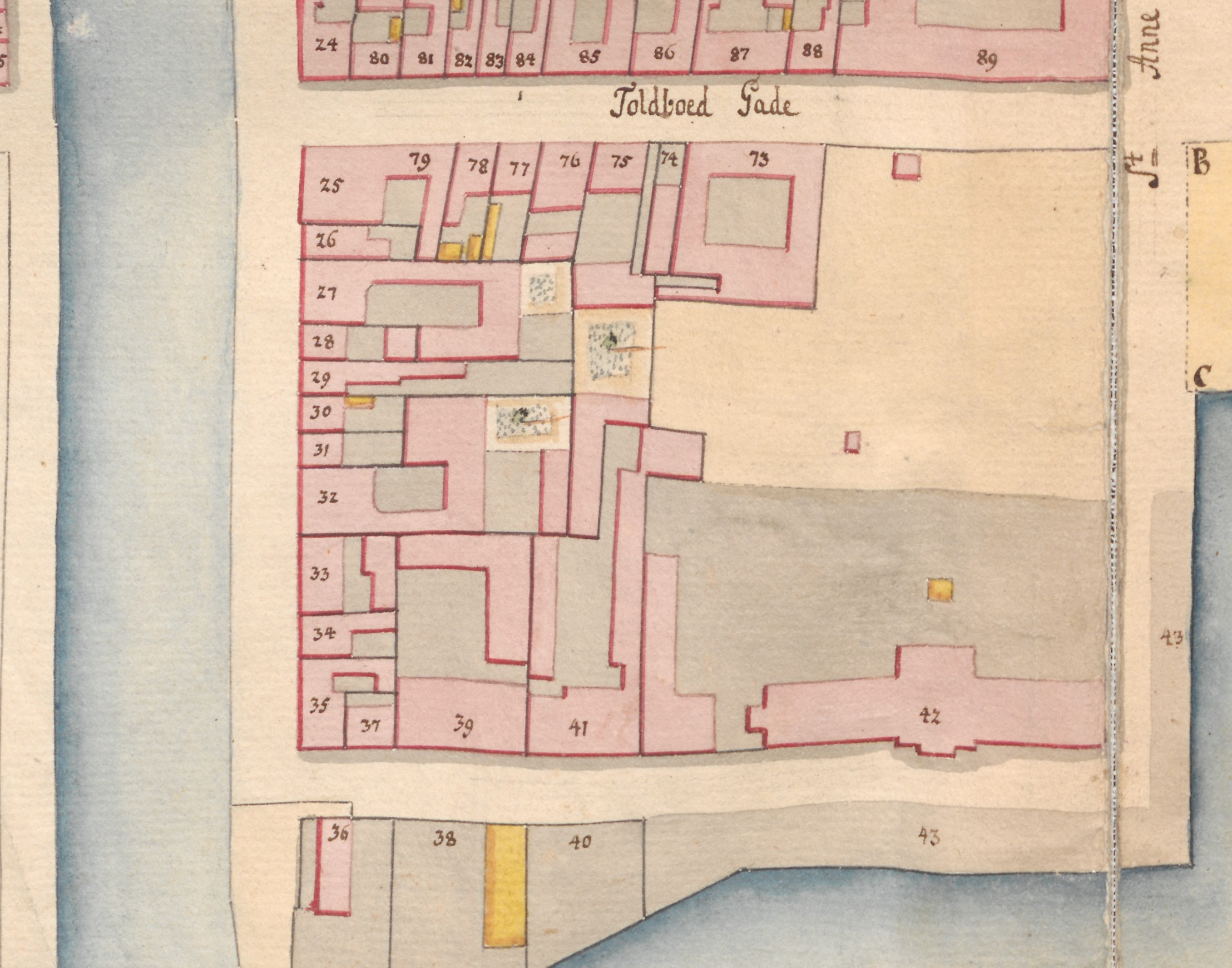
No. 28 seen in a detail from Christian Gedde's map of St. Ann's Rast Quarter, 1757

In the new cadastre of 1756, the property was listed as No. 28 owned by skipper Hans Jacob Tofte.

At the time 1787 census, No. 28 was home to two households. Johanne Kirstine Morthorst, a widow ropemaker, resided in the building with her late husband's son and daughter-in-law, four apprentices and two lodgers. Jan Gottlieb Brandt, a sail-maker, resided in the building with Anna Christina, their two children (aged two and five) and a maid.

The property was later acquired by Jacob Bierregaard, a master ropemaker. At the time of the 1801 census, he resided in the building with his wife J. C. Morthorst, the 17-year-old niece J.S. Beierholm and two maids.

In the new cadastre of 1806, the property was again listed as No. 28. It was by then still owned by Jacob Bierregaard.

=== Quade family ===
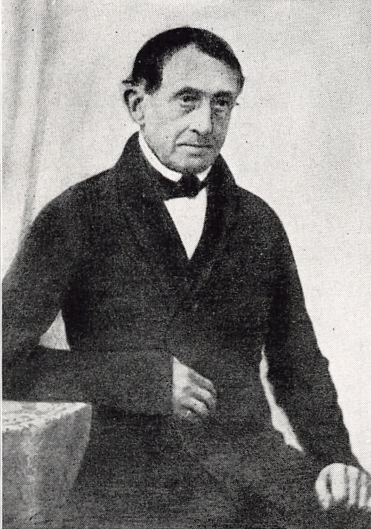
Johann Diederich Quaade

On 28 May 1814, Nyhavn 55 (then lot no. 28) was sold at public auction to Johan Didrich Quaade for 6,136 Rigsbankdaler. Didrich Quaade (2 December 1776 – 23 December 1855), who was originally from Pommerby, Gelting, had come to Copenhagen in an early age. He started a wholesale and freight business after being licensed as a wholesaler (grisserer) 28 April 1813. His new property was home to his business, as well as to himself and many other members of the Quade family. Quade, who remained unmarried, was in the family known as "Bedsteonkel" ("Best Uncle" or "Grand Uncle"). He died in his property on 23 December 1855 and was buried from St. Peter's Church.

At the time of the 1834 census, Quade resided on the third floor of his property with one of his employees. Albrecht Christian Heinerich Quaade, one of Quade's employees, resided on the second floor with his wife Mette Helena Maria Quaade (née Haustedt) and their six children (aged three to 20). Margaretha Charlotte Quaade, Quade's sister and housekeeper (husjomfru), resided on the ground floor with two maids.

Quade bequeathed property and firm to his nephew Johan Peter Lorenz Quaade (1827–1889). In 1864, he partnered with N. C. Krake under the name J. P. Quaade & Krake. The company traded in grain and colonial goods as well as whale oil and other products from Greenland, Iceland and the Faroe Islands. In 1882, Krake left the company. In 1886, Quade's son Christian Veleur Quaade (born 1860) was made a partner in the firm which from then on traded as J. P. Quaade & Søn. At some point, Quade moved his company first to Sankt Annæ Plads 17 and then to Amaliegade 21A

Nyhavn was during the Quade family's ownership also home to other tenants than family members. The painter Heinrich Gustav Ferdinand Holm (1804-1861) was among the residents in the years around 1854.

The property was home to 10 residents at the 1880 census. Mette Marie Quaade resided on the ground floor with one maid. Oluf Peter Jørgensen, a Husfader Roersbetjent, resided on the first floor with his wife Wilhelmine Jørgensen and their two children (aged zero and three). Svend Jensen, a sailor, resided on the first floor of the side wing (langsal) with his wife Ane Marie Jensen, their six-year-old foster daughter and a female cook. Bolette Marie Olsen, a widow, resided on the second floor with two sons (music teacher and painter, aged 55 and 50) and one maid. Hans Olsen, a barkeeper, resided in the basement with his wife Marie Olsen and two sailors.

=== Later history ===
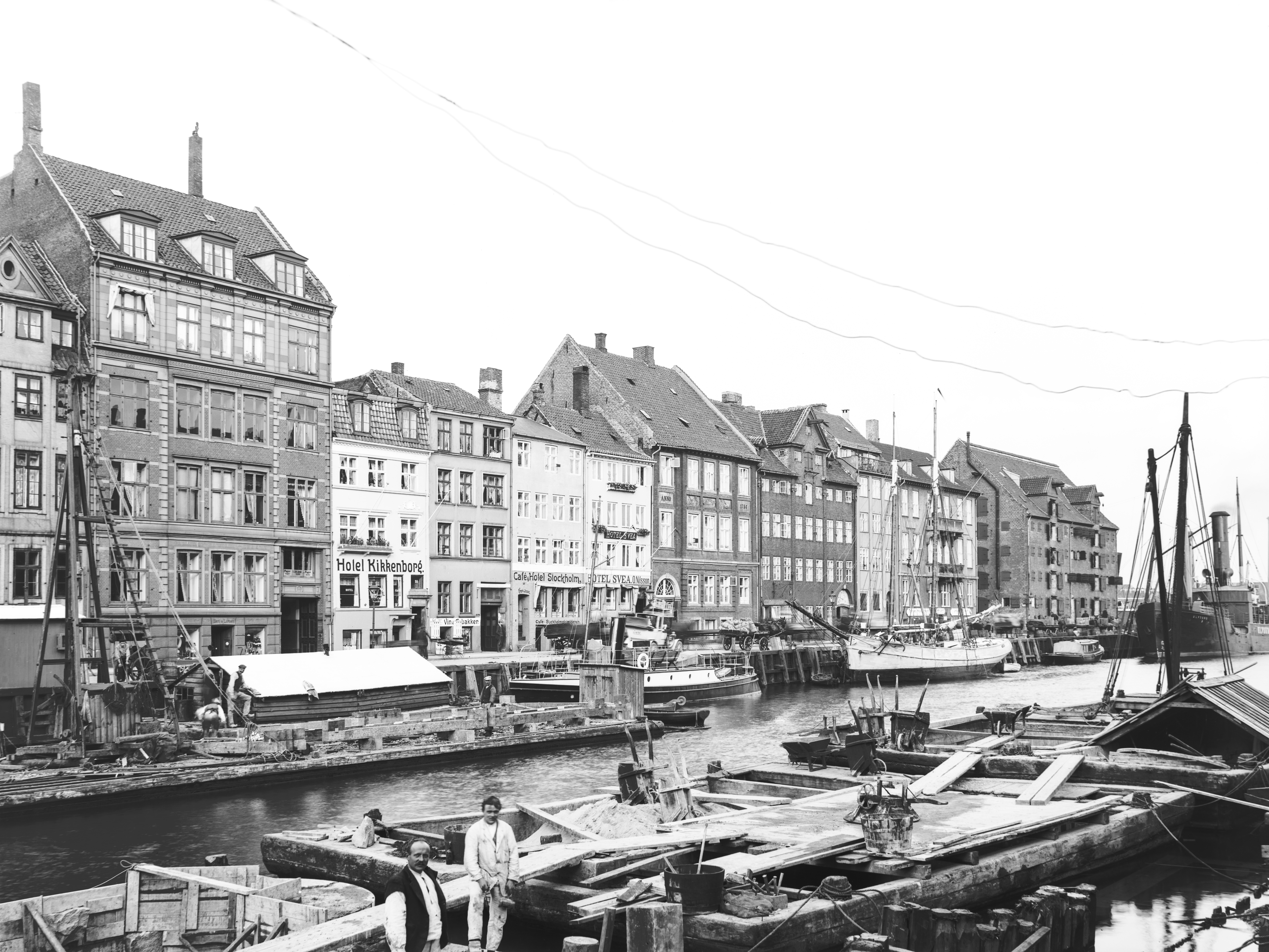
Nyhavn 55 as Hotel Kikkenberg visible in photograph by Johannes Hauerslev

The building was later operated as a hotel under the name Hotel Kikkenborg. In 1906, Nyhavn 55 was subject to various alterations. The roof with wall dormer was in this connection replaced by a mansard roof and display windows were installed on the ground floor. A warehouse was demolished in the yard. A haulier was later based in the building.

== Architecture ==
The house consists of three storeys over a raised cellar and is just three bays wide. The roof features a large wall dormer. The door in the right right-hand side of the building is raised a few steps from the street and is topped by a transom window.

== Todau ==
The building has now been converted into condominiums. The owners are together with those from the adjacent building at No. 57 organized in E/F Nyhavn 57.

== Gallery ==
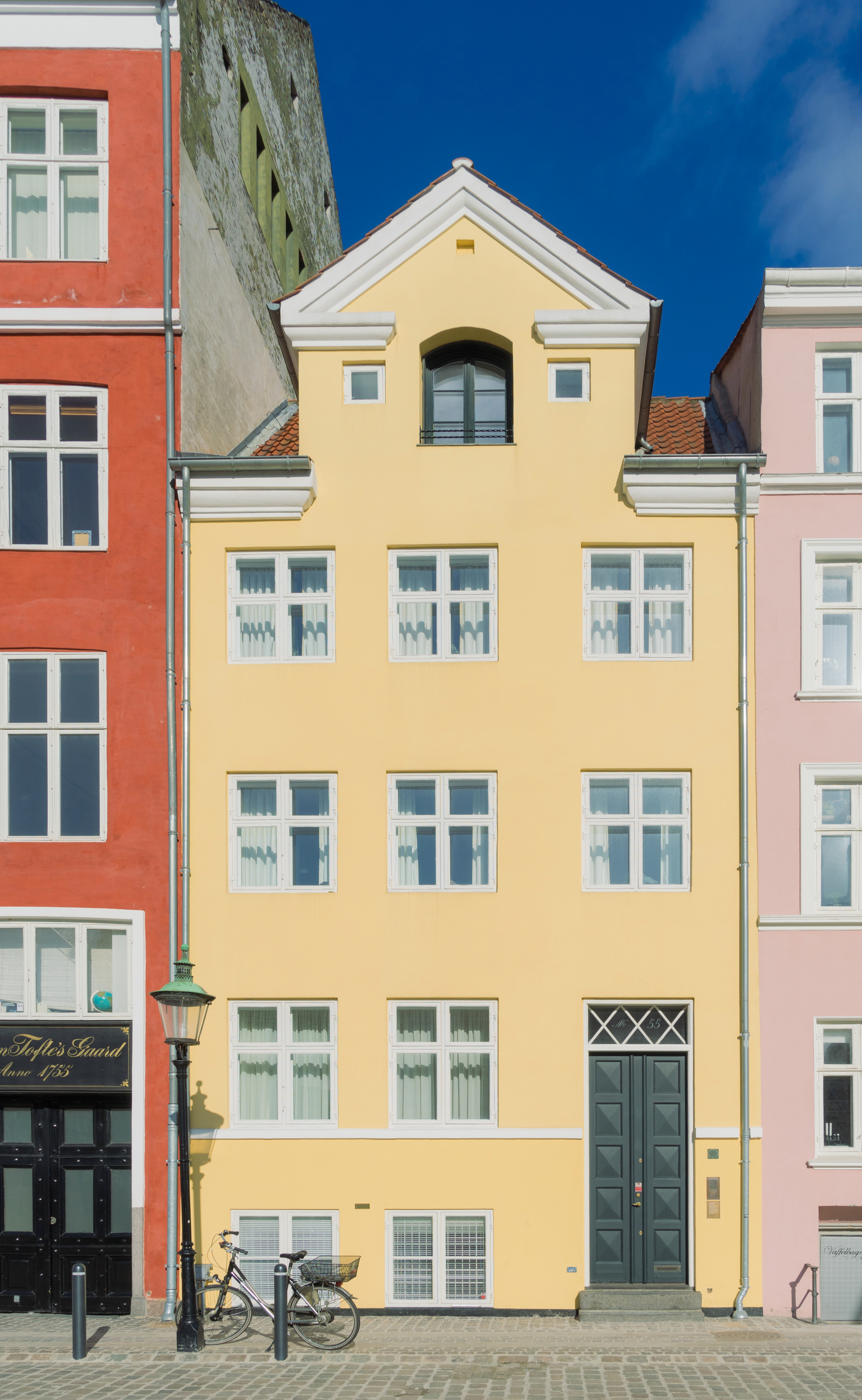
