= Augusta Nielsen =

Danish ballet dancer

Augusta Wilhelmine Nielsen
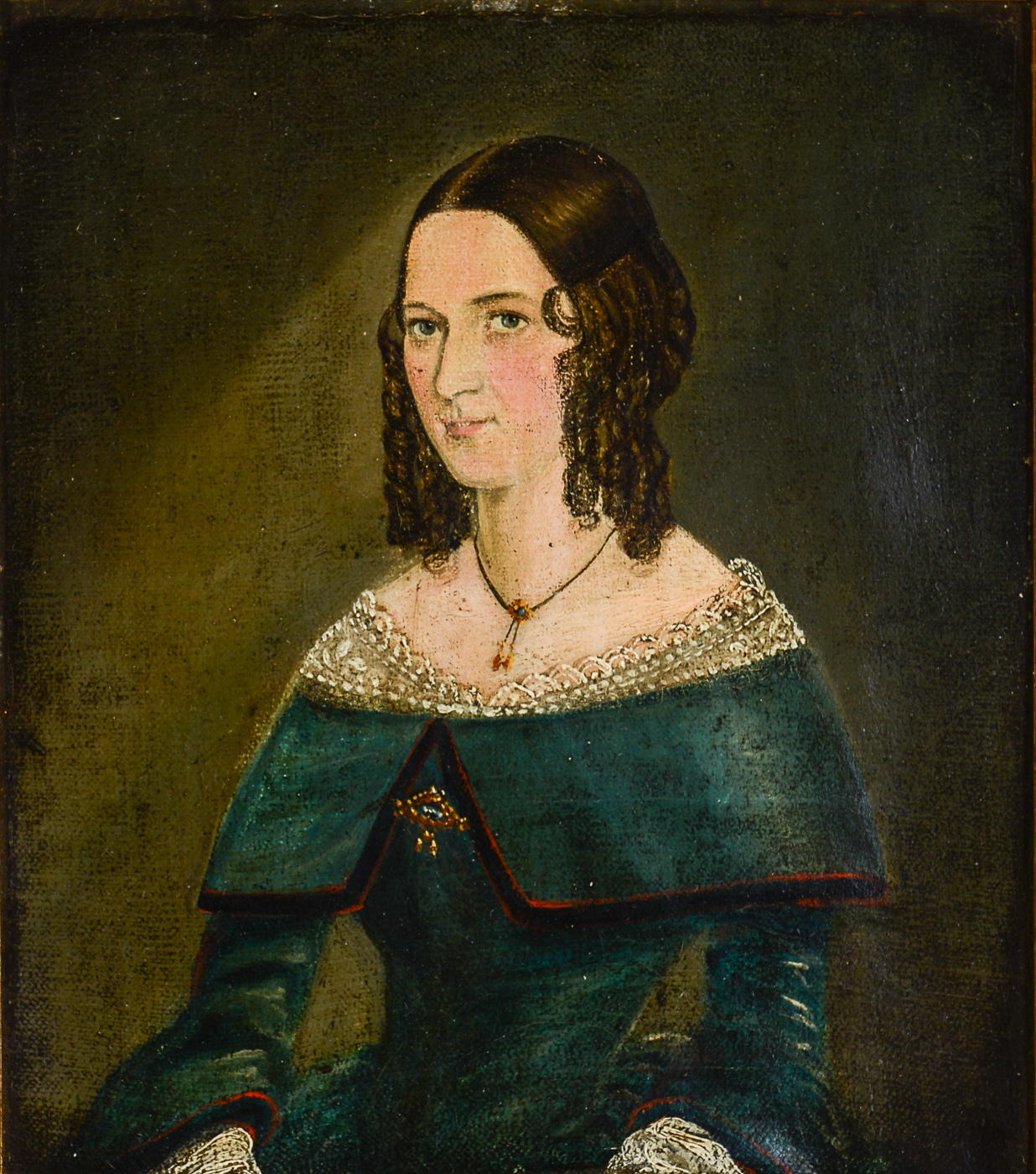
- Born: 20 February 1822; Copenhagen, Denmark
- Died: 29 March 1902 (aged 80); Copenhagen, Denmark
- Burial place: Assistens Cemetery, Copenhagen
- Occupation: Danish ballet dancer

Augusta Wilhelmine Nielsen (20 February 1822–29 March 1902) was a Danish ballet dancer who performed in the early ballets of August Bournonville.

== Biography ==
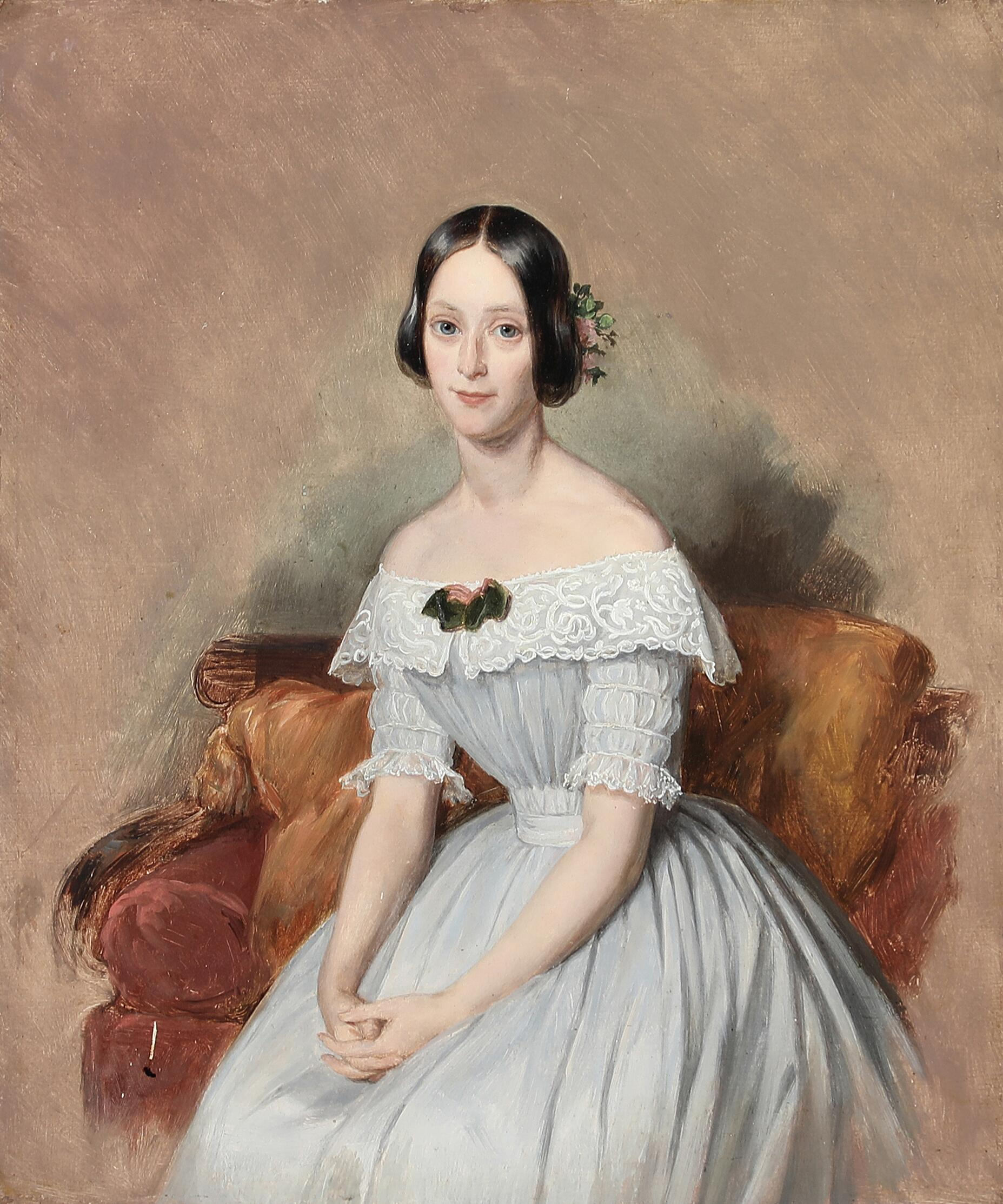
Nielsen painted by Edvard Lehmann.

Born in Copenhagen, Nielsen was one of August Bournonville's earliest pupils. When Lucile Grahn left Denmark in 1839, Nielsen inherited her roles. She made her début in La Sylphide in the role Bournonville had choreographed specially for her predecessor.

She was particularly admired for her performances in Bournonville's La Cracovienne and La Lithuanienne as well as for her La Cachucha dance as Céleste in Toreadoren which Bournonville choreographed for her in 1840. After becoming a soloist the following year, she went to Paris to further her studies under Jules Perrot. She then appeared in Berlin, Stockholm and Christiania. Her career came to an end in 1849 when she came on stage wearing a diadem which the audience thought was a priceless gift from one of her well-to-do admirers although it was in fact just a cheap theatrical prop. Such was her shock at the jeering, she never dared set foot in the theatre again. In later life she became mentally ill and died on 29 March 1902, completely forgotten as a dancer.

== Assessment ==
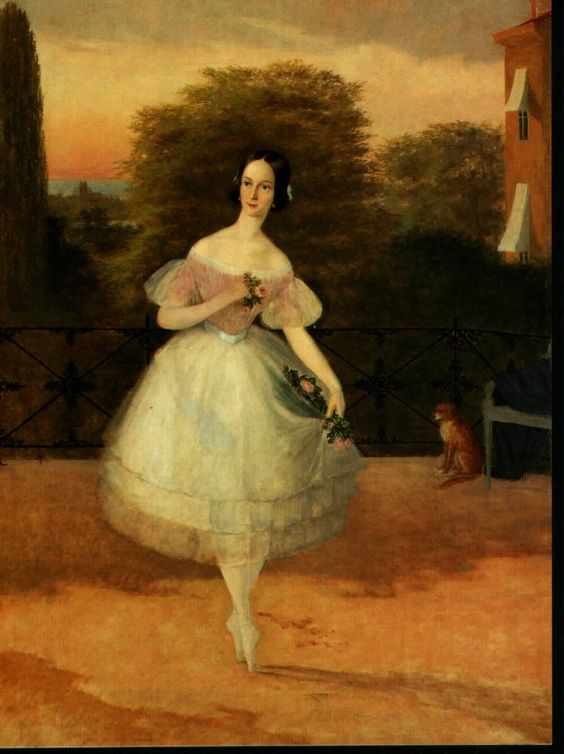
Nielsen in Bournonville's Toreadoren

Bounonville characterised her as being "synonymous with lightness and ladylike elegance". She was said to be tall and thin with a perfect figure and beautiful blue eyes. In contrast to Andrea Krætzmer and Grahn, her dancing was devoid of erotic temperament and vivid facial expression but this was compensated by her sensitivity, almost noble charisma and technical prowess, making her popular with her audiences.
