= Turgot =

Turgot (English: /tʊərˈɡoʊ/, French: [tyʁɡo]) may refer to:

- Turgot of Durham (c. 1050 – 1115), Prior of Durham and Bishop of St Andrews
- Michel-Étienne Turgot (1690–1751), mayor of Paris
- Étienne-François Turgot (1721–1789), governor of French Guiana
- Anne Robert Jacques Turgot (1727–1781), French economist and statesman
- Louis Félix Étienne, marquis de Turgot (1796–1866), French diplomat
- Sébastien Turgot (born 1984), French cyclist

== See also ==
- Turgut (disambiguation)
