= Turgut =

Turgut is a Turkish given name. Turgut may also refer to:

== Given name ==
- Turgut Alp (died 1334/35), Ottoman military commander
  - Turgut Alp (fictional character), a character based on Turgut Alp in Diriliş: Ertuğrul
- Turgut Atakol (1915–1988), Turkish basketball player
- Turgut Aykaç (born 1958), former Turkish boxer
- Turgut Berkes (1953–2018), Turkish rock musician, painter, and writer
- Turgut Göle (1913–2002), Turkish politician
- Turgut Karataş (1963–2024), Turkish Romani singer, known as Ankaralı Turgut
- Turgut Özakman (1930–2013), Turkish lawyer, civil servant, dramaturge and writer
- Turgut Özal (1927–1993), Turkish president and political leader
- Turgut Özatay (1927–2002), Turkish film actor
- Turgut Polat (born 1993), Turkish table tennis player
- Turgut Reis (1485–1565), Turkish privateer and Ottoman admiral as well as Bey of Algiers; Beylerbey of the Mediterranean; and first Bey, later Pasha, of Tripoli
- Turgut Doğan Şahin (born 1988), Turkish footballer
- Turgut Toydemir (1938–2024), Turkish architect
- Turgut Uçar (born 1964), Turkish football manager and coach
- Yasar Turgut Bilgin (born 1957), Turkish author

== Surname ==
- Ankaralı Turgut (1963–2024), Turkish Romani singer
- Azmi Turgut (born 1988), Turkish basketball player
- Jansin Turgut (born 1996), Turkish rugby league footballer
- Şerif Turgut, Turkish woman war correspondent

== Places ==
- Turgut, Çorum
- Turgut, Muğla, a town in Muğla Province, Turkey

== See also ==
- Turgot, a given name and surname
