= Theory of fructification =

Theory of the interest rate in economics

In economics, the theory of fructification is a theory of the interest rate which was proposed by French economist and finance minister Anne Robert Jacques Turgot in his 1770 book Reflections on the Formation and Distribution of Wealth. The term theory of fructification is due to Eugen von Böhm-Bawerk, who considered Turgot as the first economist who tried to develop a scientific explanation of the interest rate.

According to Turgot, a capitalist can either lend his money or employ it to purchase a plot of land. Because fruitful land yields an annual rent forever, its price is given by the formula of a perpetual annuity: If A denotes the land's annual rent and r denotes the interest rate, the land price is simply A/r. From this formula, Turgot concluded that "the lower the interest rate, the more valuable is the land." Specifically, if the interest rate approached zero, the land price would become infinite. Because land prices must be finite, the interest rate must be strictly positive. Turgot also argued that the mechanism that keeps interest rates above zero crowds out inefficient capital formation.

Henry George believed that a fructification theory, which centered around a "reproductive or vital force of nature", was the cause of interest rates. George's theory differed from Turgot's, since George believed that interest could also arise from natural improvements in capital, not just from land itself. For example, farm animals or grain that can grow and reproduce would, under George's theory, theoretically be able to create interest, even if all land became common property.

"Thus interest springs from the power of increase which the reproductive forces of nature, and the in effect analogous capacity for exchange, give to capital. It is not an arbitrary, but a natural thing; it is not the result of a particular social organization, but of laws of the universe which underlie society. It is, therefore, just."

— Henry George, "Chapter III: Of Interest and the Cause of Interest", Progress and Poverty (1879)

Silvio Gesell criticized Turgot's and George's support of the theory of fructification, as Gesell argued that they both failed to discern the correct cause of interest. Gesell believed that the theory of fructification is flawed since it explicitly presupposes that money is unproductive, while failing to explain why money can buy land that produces interest.

Böhm-Bawerk, who sponsored a different interest theory, considered Turgot's approach circular. However, according to Joseph Schumpeter, the eminent economic historian, "Turgot's contribution is not only by far the greatest performance in the field of interest theory the eighteenth century produced but it clearly foreshadowed much of the best thought of the last decades of the nineteenth."

Much later, economists demonstrated that the theory of fructification can be stated rigorously in a general equilibrium model. They also generalized Turgot's proposition in two respects. First, land suitable for residential or industrial use can be substituted for agricultural land. Second, in a growing economy, the existence of land implies that the interest rate exceeds the growth rate if the land's income share is bounded away from zero. The latter result is notable because it states that land ensures dynamic efficiency.
