= Jacques Hardion =

Jacques Hardion (17 October 1686, Tours, Touraine – 2 October 1766, Versailles) was a French historian, scholar and translator from ancient Greek.

After studying at Tours, he earned a place as tutor to Nicolas-François Dupré de Saint-Maur. He was elected member of the Academy of Inscriptions and Belles Lettres in 1728 and the Académie française in 1730. Having been appointed librarian of the king and the royal family at Versailles, he was chosen to give lessons in history and literature to the children of Louis XV.

He was also known as a protégé of Turgot and served as tutor to Mesdames de France before joining the royal household at Versailles. Hardion authored a twenty-volume Histoire universelle and played an active role within the Académie française, where he both received and was received by several notable members of the period.
