= Paris architecture in the era of absolutism =

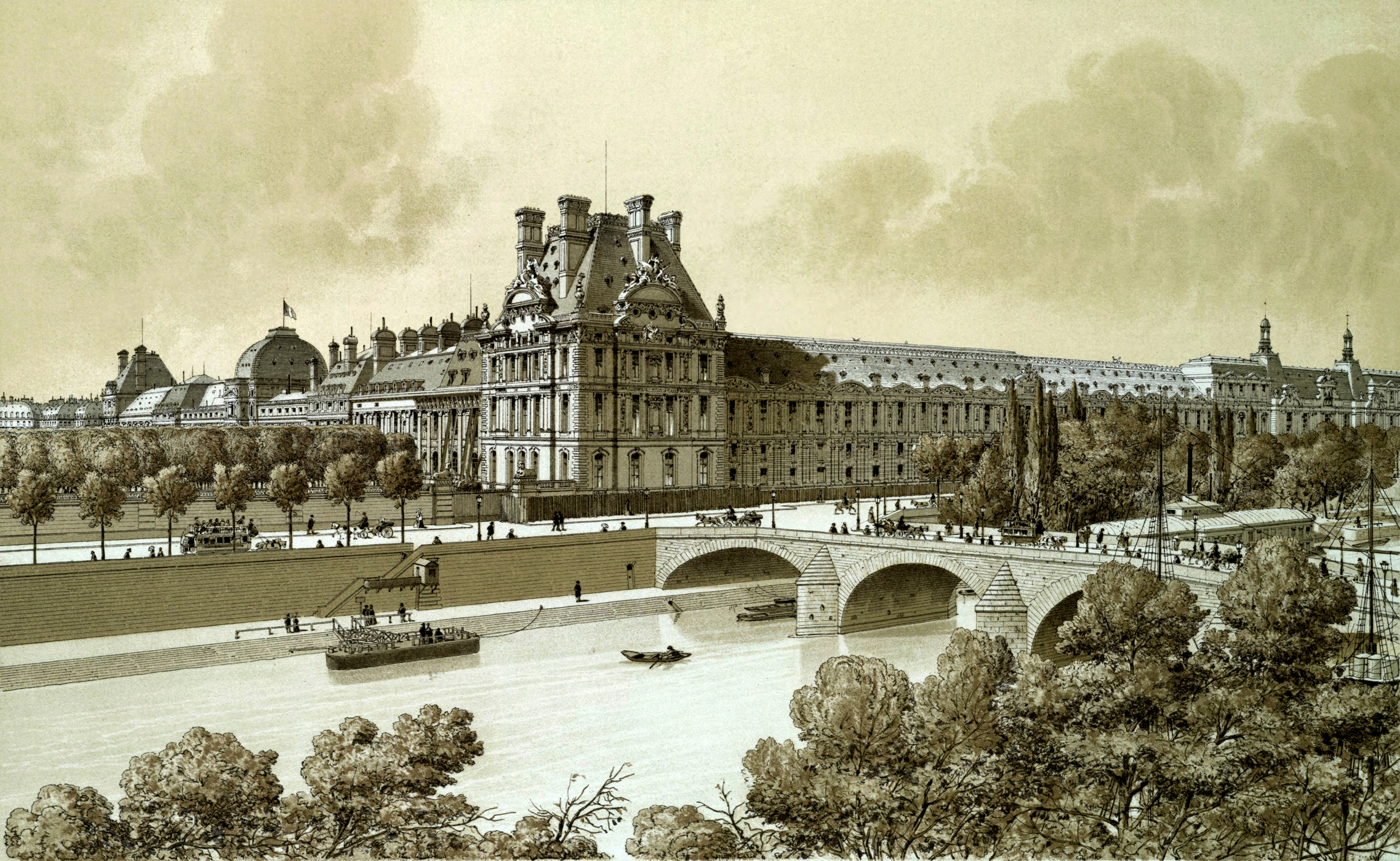
The Louvre and Tuileries Palace, royal residences of the era of French absolutism

The architecture of Paris and its nearest surrounding suburbs in the era of absolutism (16–18th centuries) (Note: Formally, the era of absolutism started with the reign of Henry IV, but its signs began to appear throughout the sixteenth century, even during the estate monarchy. The apotheosis of the era of absolutism is the reign of Louis XIV.) went through several important historical stages: the transition from Flamboyant to the Renaissance, the emergence of the "Jesuit style" and mannerism, the birth of Baroque and Classicism, the rise of the decorative Rococo style. The Italian Wars had a great influence on Parisian architecture and urban planning, during which the court of Louis XII became acquainted with the ideas of the Italian Renaissance.

Invited Italian architects began to turn the medieval castles of French kings and court nobles into elegant palace residences with representative facades and richly decorated halls. It was under Francis I, who waged protracted wars with the Habsburgs for hegemony in the Mediterranea, that the French Renaissance flourished. The transformation of the Louvre into a royal palace was associated with the further development of Renaissance architecture in France, which dominated the entire 16th and early 17th centuries. During this time, under the influence of various factors, Parisian architecture underwent significant changes, which affected the development and appearance of the capital. The construction of the Luxembourg Palace in the first third of the 17th century ended the era of the French Renaissance in Paris, and the end of the colonnade of the eastern facade of the Louvre in the second half of the 17th century marked the formation of the classicist style.

After the sunset of the Renaissance in Paris, classicism for a long time coexisted with another stylistic trend – Baroque. The construction of Les Invalides at the end of the 17th century completed the monumental Baroque style, which in the first quarter of the 18th century actually turned into decoration of the mansions and palaces of the Paris aristocracy (this style of interiors was called Rococo). At the same time, classicism reigned supreme in the architecture of the city throughout the eighteenth century (its sign was Église Sainte-Geneviève, and the most grandiose urban ensemble was the Place Louis XV at the tip of the Tuileries Garden).

The architecture of the interiors of the absolutism era was most clearly expressed in the royal palaces of Paris (the Louvre, the Tuileries, the Palais-Royal and Luxembourg), as well as in the suburban residences of the Kings: Versailles, Grand and Small Trianon, Marly, Saint Germain, Saint-Cloud, Meudon, Boulogne, Muette, Vincennes, Choisy-le-Roi, Rambouillet and Fontainebleau. In the architecture of Paris of the era of absolutism, one can trace the evolution of urban compositions (palace and park ensembles and squares) from the early Renaissance to the heyday of classicism (with elements of an emerging Empire style) and Baroque. The era of absolutism ended with the Great French Revolution and the overthrow of Louis XVI. During the revolution, the symbol of tyranny was demolished – the medieval fortress-prison of the Bastille, on the site of which today is the Place de la Bastille. In addition, the revolutionary element removed royal statues from the metropolitan areas, partially destroyed or converted some churches and tax outposts.

== Historical background ==
By the beginning of the Renaissance, medieval Paris was a controversial sight. The city had outstanding works of Romanesque and Gothic architecture; however, Parisian buildings were dominated not by stone temples and palaces, but by wooden residential buildings that crowded along narrow and winding streets with open gutters. On both sides of the bridges across the Seine were benches with workshops and living quarters of the owners. New waves of visitors sought to settle within the old fortress walls, so the streets and courtyards were given a minimum of space.

By the end of the 15th and beginning of the 16th centuries, more than 300 thousand citizens lived in Paris; it was one of the largest cities in Europe. Often Paris of that era was called the "urban colossus in an agricultural country".

In the 16th century, Paris entered a new phase for itself, associated with the gradual strengthening of absolute monarchy, the expansion of feudalism and the emergence of capitalism, which radically influenced the architecture and urban planning of the capital. Over three centuries, the architecture of the city has undergone significant changes and went through several stylistic stages. All this happened against the backdrop of the growing social role of the merchants, the separation from the feudal estate of the urban bourgeoisie and the elimination of the feudal fragmentation of France. During the unsuccessful for France Italian Wars, the French aristocracy became closely acquainted with Italy, where at that time a new worldview and Renaissance art were rapidly developing. French kings drew attention to secular nature and humanism of Italian art. The increased wealth and desire to emphasize the greatness of the royal court prompted the monarchs to begin large-scale palace construction on the basis of principles borrowed from the architecture of the Italian Renaissance.

Louis XII and his son-in-law Francis I began to actively invite architects and artists from Italy to rebuild their heavy castles.

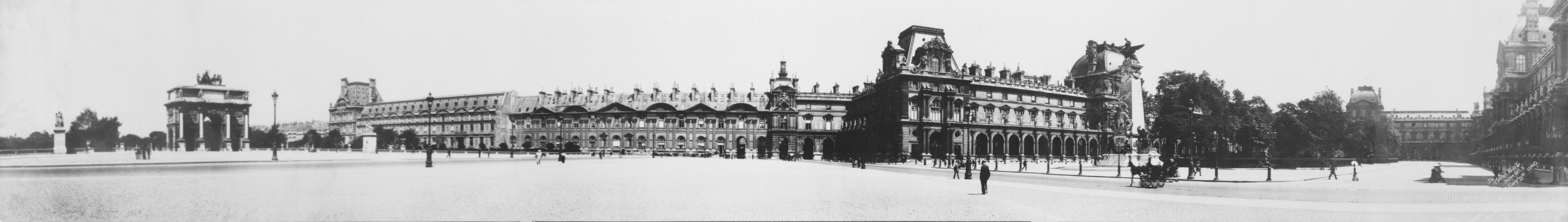
The Louvre Palace and the Arc de Triomphe du Carrousel in the photo of 1908

In the second half of the 16th century, the protracted Religious Wars between Catholics and Protestants, whose apotheosis in Paris became St. Bartholomew's Day massacre, as well as the peasant wars of the 1590s led to the devastation of the treasury and reduced funding for the new construction. Economic difficulties, in turn, led to a simplification of architecture. Even in relatively prosperous Paris, they began to build mainly of brick, only occasionally using stone, and reduced the use of decorative details to a minimum. This desire for minimalism in architecture found an echo in one of the first Parisian ensembles – Place des Vosges.

Location of architectural objects in Paris
1. Louvre Palace
2. Tuileries Palace
3. Palais-Royal
4. Saint-Germain l'Auxerrois
5. Saint-Roch
6. Place Vendôme
7. Fontaine des Innocents
8. Saint-Eustache
9. Place des Victoires
10. Hôtel de Ville
11. Saint-Gervais-Saint-Protais
12. Saint-Paul-Saint-Louis
13. Musée Carnavalet
14. Institut de France
15. Place Dauphine
16. Saint-Germain-des-Prés
17. Odéon-Théâtre de l'Europe
18. Luxembourg Palace
19. Sorbonne Chapel
20. Hôtel Salé

The eradication of feudal fragmentation and the victory of absolutism contributed to the growth of national feeling among French architects, who sought to independently comprehend the ancient heritage and develop a national architectural style. National trends in architecture found their expression in the rejection of the project of the eastern facade of the Louvre, proposed by Bernini, the greatest representative of the Italian Baroque. The result of the controversy surrounding the competition projects for the new facade of the Louvre was the creation in 1671 of the Royal Academy of Architecture (today it is a branch of the French Academy of Fine Arts). It was intended to acquaint the public with the basic laws of architecture, the teachings of the great theorists of the past and the experience of ancient builders. As part of these tasks, the architect Claude Perrault translated into French and published in Paris a treatise by his Roman colleague of the 1st century BC Vitruvius "Ten Books on Architecture".

The sources of inspiration for French architects were the most important discoveries of ancient architecture - Herculaneum (1711) and Pompeii (1748). In addition, the temples of Paestum, Segesta and Agrigentum became widely known in the 18th century. Since 1752, the "Collection of Antiques" by the French antiquarian Count de Caylus began to be published in Paris.

During one of the grand tours, architects Charles-Louis Clerisso and Robert Adam reopened Diocletian's Palace in Dalmatia (later travel sketches and Clerisso's drawings formed the basis of neoclassicism). Architect Julien-David Leroy visited Ottoman Greece, which for a long time was inaccessible to European travelers. In 1758 he published the results of his research in the book Ruins of the Most Beautiful Monuments of Greece. The "History of Ancient Art" and "Notes on the History of Art" by the German theorist Johann Joachim Winckelmann had a huge impact on the establishment of the aesthetics of classicism in France.

On the eve of Great French Revolution philosophical views of Voltaire, Jean le Rond d'Alembert and Denis Diderot defined classicism as the most an acceptable architectural system, as opposed to the Baroque and Rococo styles of the outgoing era. The stronghold of classicism and the center for the development of new subjects in architecture was the progressive Royal Academy of Architecture.

In 1808, the famous book "Description of Paris and its buildings" was published, in which Charles Paul Landon and Jacques-Guillaume Legrand assessed the architecture of the capital of the era of absolutism.

== Palaces, castles and mansions ==
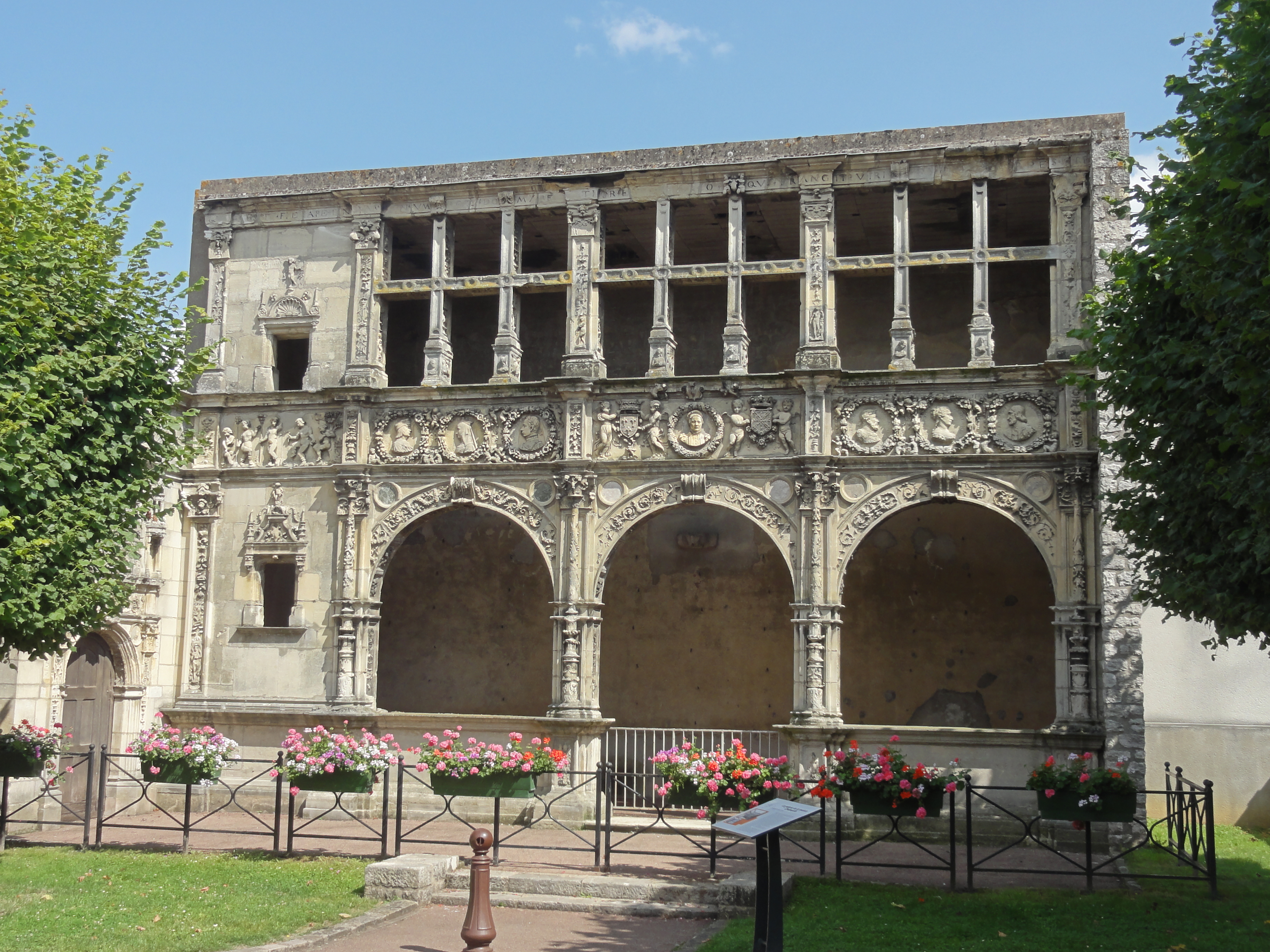
House of Francis I in Moret-sur-Louin

The earliest example of French Renaissance architecture is the so-called "House of Francis I." It was originally built in 1523 as a hunting lodge near the Fontainebleau Palace, which was the royal residence. In 1824, the building was dismantled and moved to Paris in stone, today it is located in the town of Moret-sur-Louin (department Seine-et-Marne) and its original appearance has been restored. With its appearance, “the house of Francis I” boldly opposed itself to medieval architecture with its closedness, asceticism and asymmetry. Innovations were floor divisions, including a beautifully dissected second floor, and three wide arches on the first floor, as well as graceful reliefs by the great sculptor Jean Goujon, which enriched the facade (portrait bas-reliefs appeared on the facade later).
