= Louis Félix Étienne, marquis de Turgot =

French politician (1796–1866)

- Born: 26 September 1796; Bons-Tassilly
- Died: 2 October 1866 (aged 70); Versailles, Yvelines
- Resting place: Ponts sur Seulles
- Known for: Politician & Diplomat

Louis Félix Étienne, marquis de Turgot (English: /tʊərˈɡoʊ/ toor-GOH, French: [lwi feliks etjɛn də tyʁɡo]; 26 September 1796, in Bons-Tassilly – 2 October 1866, in Versailles) was a French diplomat and politician.

== Family ==
He was the son of Étienne-François Turgot (1721–1789), marquis de Soumont; his great-uncle was the economist Anne Robert Jacques Turgot, Baron de Laune, who had served as Controller-General of Finances and Chief Minister to Louis XVI in the 1770s; his great grandfather was Michel-Étienne Turgot. He married Louise Mouton de Lobau, in 1830, daughter of Georges Mouton, comte Lobau. He had children Jacques-Louis Turgot, who married Tecla de Montaignac in 1867; and Madame Dubois de L'Estaing.

== Career ==
He left Saint-Cyr, and was a trooper in the guard who followed Louis XVIII to Ghent. He was an officer in the cuirassiers of the Royal Guard under the Restoration until his resignation on 26 July 1830, at the time of the July Revolution.

He rallied to Louis Philippe, and entered the House of Peers in 1832, where he sat with the right, supporters of conservative politics. After the presidential election of 1848, he became a fervent supporter of Louis-Napoleon Bonaparte. He had no official business when, on 26 October 1851, he was appointed foreign minister in the cabinet containing St. Arnaud and Maupas, charged with preparing a coup. Without doubt the Marquis de Turgot owed this amazing promotion to his name, as much as his social position. Although not required, apparently he confided in the coup, and he fully supported, as a man of order, the new regime, that was responsible for admission by the European embassies. On 28 July 1852, he was replaced by Drouyn Lhuys, and was appointed senator.

In April 1853, he obtained the post of ambassador in Madrid. During his mission, he fought a duel with his U.S. counterpart, in which he was seriously injured. Recovered, he became ambassador in August 1858 in Bern, where he remained for eight years until his death. Turgot had said: “Colonies are like fruits which cling to the tree only till they ripen.” He had predicted that as soon as America can take care of herself, she would break away from Britain.

Political offices
Preceded by Jules Baroche	Minister of Foreign Affairs; 26 October 1851 – 28 July 1852	Succeeded by Édouard Drouyn de Lhuys
