= Pierre Étienne Bourgeois de Boynes =

French magistrate, statesman and Secretary of the Navy

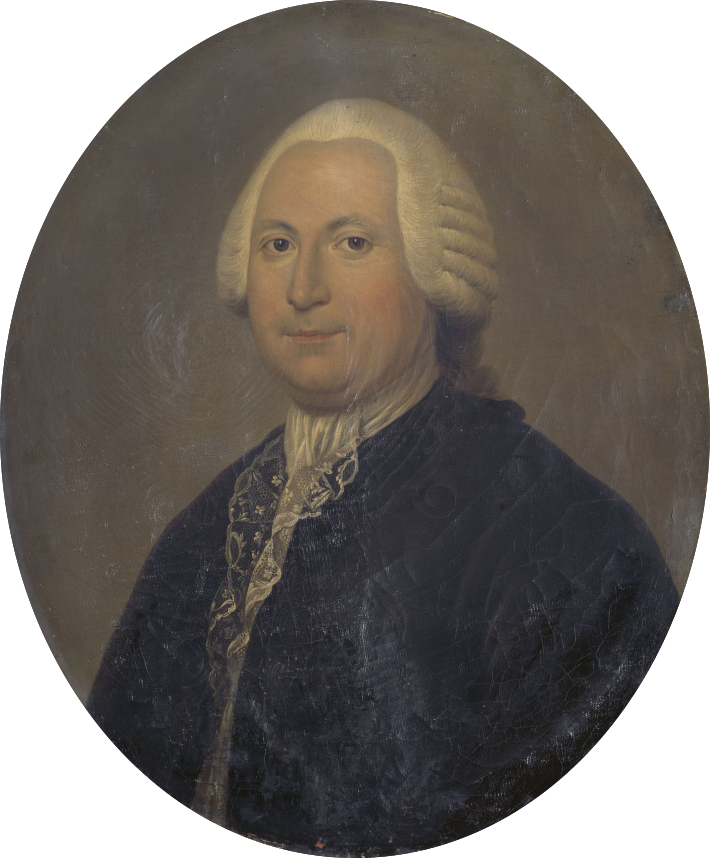
Pierre-Etienne Bourgeois de Boynes

Pierre Étienne Bourgeois de Boynes, Marquis de Boynes, Count Gueudreville, Marquis de Sains, Baron Laas (29 November 1718, Paris – 19 September 1783, Boynes) was a French magistrate, statesman, and Secretary of the Navy of Louis XV.

== Biography ==
He was the eldest son of Étienne Bourgeois de Boynes (1683–1754), Treasurer General of the Royal Bank, and his first wife, Helen Francine (1692–1722). Hee first married Mary Margaret Catherine Parat Montgeron (1737—1753) which he had a daughter, Marguerite (1753–1762). His first wife died in childbirth; he married his second wife, Charlotte Louise Desgots (1740–1804) who gave him seven children:

- Elizabeth Louise (1764–1853) (Comtesse de Bourbon-Busset);
- Stephen Angel (1766–1795);
- François Etienne (1767–1792);
- Antoine Pierre Philibert (1769–1803);
- Antoine Pierre Louis (1770–1792);
- Charlotte Hermine (1773–1825) (Marquise de Saint-Phalle);
- Armand Louis François (1775–1853)

Of recent nobility, his father had acquired nobility through the purchasing office of secretary of the King, he owed his career to the protection of the Marshal de Belle-Isle. Master of requests in 1745 he became intendant of Franche-Comté in 1754, and at the same time, was appointed first president of the Parliament of Besançon, overlapping functions normally in Provence.

There was a particularly strong parliamentary revolt on 20 and January 21, 1759. Thirty parliamentarians were exiled by lettres de cachet. But Choiseul reversed policy, and the exiles were recalled, in April 1761. He retired to the Franche-Comté.

He was appointed advisor of state a month later. Because the castle was not far from Malesherbes, he participated in secret negotiations initiated by Choiseul, with whom he remained on good terms, to a point as Keeper of the Seals of France Chancellor Lamoignon.

Considered one of the best minds of the Council, he was especially capable in contentious matters; he was among those who helped the chancellor Maupeou to prepare the coup majesty of 1770. According to Baron Besenval, it was he who had the idea to replace the Parlement of Paris by the Grand Council, an idea which was the starting point for reform.

His record is controversial. He undertook a number of useful reforms. He ordered shipments of Kerguelen in the Indian Ocean (which gave the name of the minister to two small islands of Kerguelen), and created an institution in Madagascar. He organized the first major naval fleet maneuvers in the Atlantic Ocean. He tried, unsuccessfully, to establish a school in Le Havre intended for the training of officers, companies of marine guards. But he also wanted to reform the navy by modeling his organization on that of the Army (Ordinance 1772), without a glimpse of the differences that made it impossible model. The situation continued to deteriorate under his ministry, with a shipbuilding downturn, declining stocks of materials, difficulties in the maintenance of the fleet.

In terms of policy, he took his distance from politics of Maupeou from late 1771 or early 1772. On April 20, 1774, he was appointed Minister of State. But with the advent of Louis XVI, was condemned for his association with the Maurepas. It claimed he had disrupted his department and he was even accused of embezzlement. Louis XVI, for his part, had told him he thought the changes he had made in the navy had come to nothing. He was fired July 20, 1774 and replaced by Turgot.

== Bibliography ==
- Jean de Viguerie, Histoire et dictionnaire du temps des Lumières. 1715-1789, Paris, Robert Laffont, coll. Bouquins, 2003 - ISBN 2-221-04810-5
- Pierre-Etienne Bourgeois de Boynes, Journal 1765-1766, éd. de Marion F. Godfroy, Paris, Honoré Champion, nov. 2008 - ISBN 978-2-7453-1762-9

Political offices
Preceded by Joseph Marie Terray	Secretaries of State for the Navy; 9 April 1771 - 20 July 1774	Succeeded by Anne Robert Jacques Turgot
