= Bons-Tassilly =

- Commune
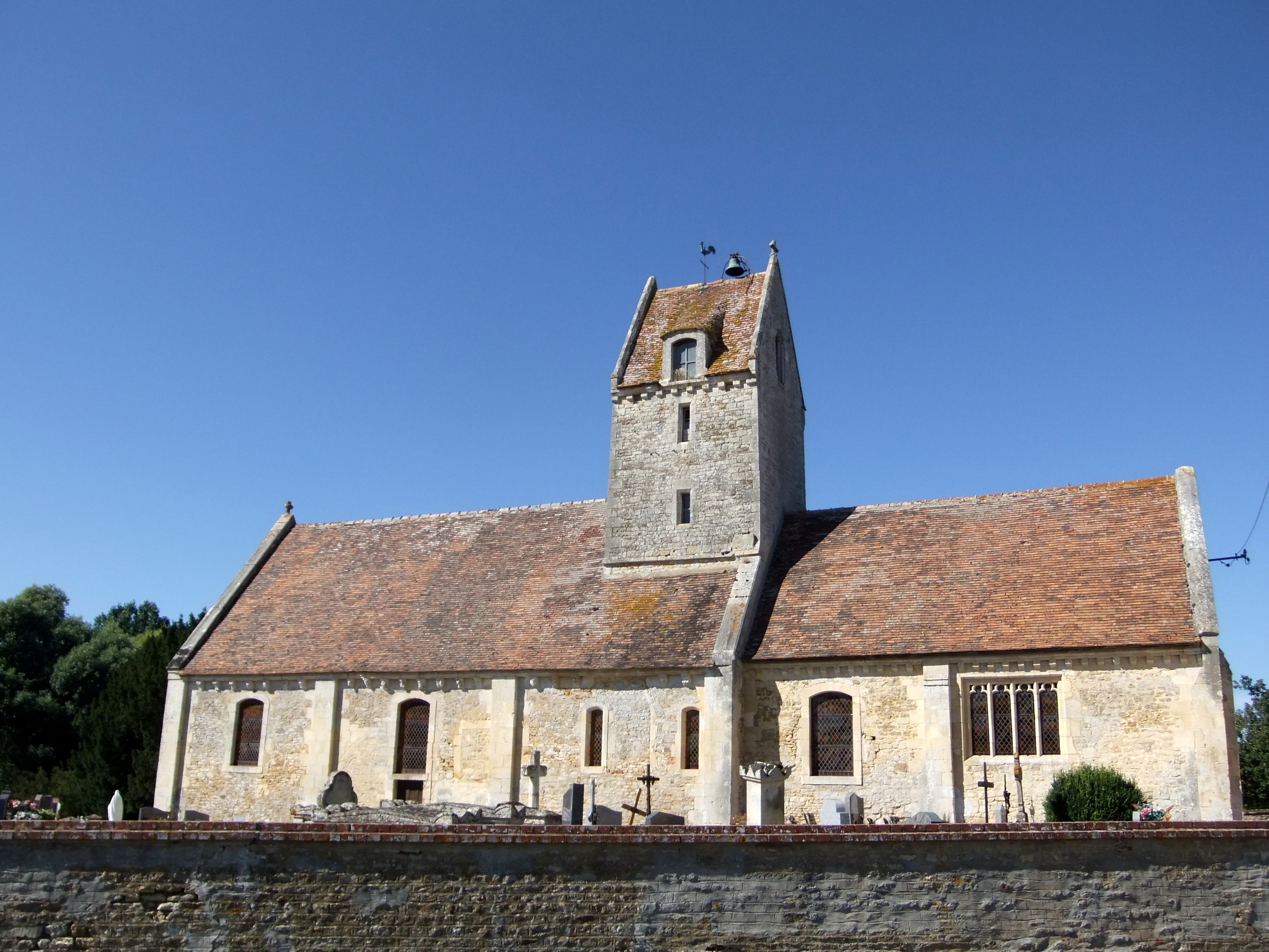
- The church in Tassilly

- Coat of arms
- Location of Bons-Tassilly
- Location within France Location within Normandy
- Coordinates: 48°58′N 0°14′W
- Country: France
- Region: Normandy
- Department: Calvados
- Arrondissement: Caen
- Canton: Falaise
- Intercommunality: Pays de Falaise

Government
  - Mayor (2023–2026): Olivier Cateau
- Area^{1}: 9.38 km^{2} (3.62 sq mi)
- Elevation: 150 m (490 ft)
- Highest elevation: 206 m (676 ft)
- Lowest elevation: 130 m (430 ft)
- Population (2023): 392
  - Density: 41.8/km^{2} (108/sq mi)
- Time zone: UTC+01:00 (CET)
  - Summer (DST): UTC+02:00 (CEST)
- INSEE/Postal code: 14088 /14420
- ^{1} French Land Register data, which excludes lakes, ponds, glaciers > 1 km^{2} (0.386 sq mi or 247 acres) and river estuaries.

Bons-Tassilly (French pronunciation: [bɔ̃ tasiji]) is a commune in the Calvados department in the Normandy region in northwestern France.

== Geography ==
The Laizon river and Cassis stream flow through the commune.

== Population ==
Historical population
Year	Pop.	±% p.a.
1968	394	—
1975	345	−1.88%
1982	354	+0.37%
1990	332	−0.80%
1999	387	+1.72%
2007	392	+0.16%
2012	381	−0.57%
2017	404	+1.18%
2023	392	−0.50%
Source: INSEE

=== National Heritage sites ===
The Commune has four buildings and areas listed as a Monument historique

- Polissoir a Neolithic polishing stone, that was listed in 1976.
- Polissoir another Neolithic polishing stone, that was listed in 1976.
- Eglise Saint-Quentin de Tassilly is a seventeenth century church, that was listed in 1928.
- Chapelle de Bons is a seventeenth century church, that was listed in 1928.

== Notable people ==
- Étienne-François Turgot - (1721 - 1789) was a French naturalist, knight of Malta and governor of French Guiana, who died here.
- Louis Félix Étienne, marquis de Turgot - (1796 - 1866) a diplomat and politician, who was born here.

== See also ==
- Communes of the Calvados department
