= Dynamic efficiency =

Concept in economics

In economics, dynamic efficiency is achieved when an economy invests less than the return to capital; conversely, dynamic inefficiency exists when an economy invests more than the return to capital. In dynamic efficiency, it is impossible to make one generation better off without making any other generation worse off. It is closely related to the notion of "golden rule of saving". In relation to markets, in industrial economics, a common argument is that business concentrations or monopolies may be able to promote dynamic efficiency.

== Are modern economies dynamically efficient? ==
Abel, Mankiw, Summers, and Zeckhauser (1989) develop a criterion for addressing dynamic efficiency and apply this model to the United States and other OECD countries, suggesting that these countries are indeed dynamically efficient.

== In the Solow growth model ==
An economy in the Solow growth model is dynamically inefficient if the savings rate exceeds the Golden Rule savings rate. If the savings rate is greater than the Golden Rule savings rate, a decrease in savings rate will increase consumption per effective unit of labor. A savings rate higher than the Golden Rule savings rate implies that an economy could be better off today and tomorrow by saving less.

== In other models ==
The Ramsey-Cass-Koopmans model does not have dynamic efficiency problems because agents discount the future at some rate β which is less than 1, and their savings rate is endogenous.

The Diamond growth model is not necessarily dynamically efficient because of the overlapping generation setup. In a competitive equilibrium, the growth rate may exceed the interest rate, which entails dynamic inefficiency. This is because agents are finitely lived. However, competitive allocations are dynamically efficient if one augments the Diamond model with land as an additional factor of production.
