= Absolute monarchy in France =

Period of French history between the 16th and 18th centuries

Absolute monarchy in France slowly emerged in the 16th century, forming a centralized political system that sought to consolidate royal authority over competing feudal and provincial powers. While its roots traced back to the reign of Henry IV, the system reached its definitive form during the tenure of Cardinals Richelieu and Mazarin. The zenith of this development was achieved under Louis XIV. By domesticating the high nobility at the Palace of Versailles and emphasizing the doctrine of the divine right of kings, Louis XIV integrated executive, legislative, and judicial pretensions into the person of the monarch. Following this peak, the system underwent a period of gradual institutional strain under Louis XV. The traditional authority of the crown began to decouple from the evolving intellectual climate of the Enlightenment, which questioned the sacral nature of kingship. By the reign of Louis XVI, the inherent contradictions of the system became critical. Efforts to implement necessary fiscal reforms were consistently blocked by well-established aristocratic interests and the complex, overlapping jurisdictions of the Ancien Régime. Unlike the enlightened absolutism practiced by contemporary rulers such as Frederick the Great or Joseph II who often justified their power through rationalism and the benefit of the state as its first servant of the state the French model remained more deeply tethered to traditionalist, sacral justifications and a rigid social hierarchy.

== Origins ==
The origins of absolutism in France date back to the 16th century and the reign of Henry IV. When in 1594 Henry IV ascended the throne, he inherited a country that had been completely exhausted by 30 years of religious wars. The country was deeply divided, trade and the economy had collapsed, and the population was declining. Furthermore, the crown had lost most of its authority over the provinces.In order to re-establish royal authority, Henry IV resorted to the Masters of Request and commissioners established under Henry II. Both groups were vested with royal authority to handle matters relating to local landowners, town councils and rebellious subjects.

Based on this system, Cardinal Richelieu, sensing the dangers of an uncontrolled aristocracy that was consuming the resources of the nation, put his greatest effort into the centralization of the state, upon which the grandeur of France depended. Despite Henry IV's efforts, the provinces still enjoyed a great deal of independence, since his commissioners' powers were expressly limited and considered an extraordinary, temporary measure. It was not until 1635 that Richelieu was able to issue commissions on a more regular basis. These commissioners, now known as intendants, received authority over the justices, officers, and subjects of the Crown. They had the power to resolve and decide matters concerning royal service, security, and public peace. They could receive requests, administer justice, preside over courts, and assist governors and lieutenant-generals.

Bernard de La Roche-Flavin's 1617 work outlined the Parlement's powers of verifying, ratifying, refusing, and limiting legislation, acting as a balance among monarchy, aristocracy, and republic. This thesis was abominable to Richelieu, who viewed the checks and balance system as a weakening of the state and characterized the resistance that the Parlement showed to his actions as hors de toute raison. Until his death, Richelieu sought to restrict the powers of the Parlement. He restricted Parlements right to remonstrate, forbade to discuss political questions and limited its judicial functions by the extensive use of judicial commissions. Moreover by claiming that the king, had the right to bring any case before his own council Richelieu was able to check most of parlements decisions.

=== Fronde ===
When Cardinal Mazarin asumed office of Principal Ministre d’État in 1642, he was repeatedly confronted with uprisings against excessive taxes, which ultimately culminated in the outbreak of the Fronde. Although the uprising was suppressed, it had a decisive influence on the adult Louis XIV. The Fronde taught Louis XIV that a divided government is a precursor to total collapse. Having been forced to flee Paris as a child during the uprisings, he developed a lifelong suspicion of the city’s populace and the Parlement of Paris, which he came to view as a threat to the crown's stability rather than a legitimate partner in governance. He realized that the high nobility, if left to their own devices in provincial strongholds, would inevitably prioritize personal ambition over national unity, leading him to centralize all political power within his own person. Moreover he was afraid that he might meet the same fate as Charles I of England.

== Louis XIV ==
With the Death of Cardinal Mazarin in March 1661, the personal rule of Louis XIV began. To secure his rule and prevent a second Fronde, Louis XIV set about reshaping the state with the help of his most important supporter, Jean-Baptiste Colbert. The king appointed Colbert as a royal minister and member of the High Council, granting him significant influence over policies affecting the parlements. Colbert also participated in the Council of Dispatches and the Royal Council of Finances, contributing to governance alongside the High Council. Prior to becoming controller general of finances in 1665, he established control over political and financial relations with law courts, marginalizing Chancellor Séguier. Despite this authority, Colbert approached the Parlement of Paris and provincial tribunals with a blend of firmness and restraint, not intending to diminish their roles in public life or law registration. At first, he did not advocate for forced registrations or immediate legislative changes. His 1665 memorandum for the Council of Justice emphasized moderation, opposing drastic laws against the parlements, believing that gradual improvement was more effective than sudden, harsh measures, which often resulted in the parlements regaining their influence after weak monarchs. As the king’s desire for personal control grew, Colbert adapted his methods to meet the king’s demands.

Louis XIV's objectives extended beyond the mere regulation of relations between the Parlement and the councils. His goal of reducing Parliament's political activities resulted in further attacks on the court's privileges and prerogatives. On 25 October 1665, the Council finished Title I, with the King himself having participated in its sessions. Three articles of this title dealt with the registration procedure, the most important of which was Article IV. It applied to lits de justice, whereby the king brought legislation to a court, usually the Parlement of Paris. The phrase 'persons whom we have commissioned for this task' also covered forced registrations conducted in the other high courts of Paris by members of the royal family, as well as in provincial parlements by governors and intendants.

Article IV stipulated that all laws registered in the presence of the King or his representatives were to be 'kept and observed' with immediate effect. This imperative required the parlements to implement any laws registered under duress at once, without any further deliberations or decrees. The article proclaimed that the king could register laws on his own authority, and that, once he had done so, the parlements had no further options. Determined to take advantage of this accomplishment, members of the Council of Justice also banned constitutionalist vocabulary, discarding ideologically offensive words. Thus, the Council purposefully eradicated the word 'remonstrance', deeming it tainted by its use in the Fronde, and replaced it with the cumbersome circumlocution 'represent to us what the parlements and other courts deem appropriate'. The Council also replaced 'sovereign courts' with 'superior courts' as the generic name for the parlements and their affiliated legal bodies, on the basis that subjects were not entitled to use the word 'sovereign'.

In order to strengthen royal authority in the provinces, Louis XIV stopped appointing governors for life and instead appointed them for three years only, a period that could be renewed if they behaved satisfactorily. As the power of the intendants grew, so did the central government's interference in local affairs. As the power of the intendants increased, so did the central government's interference in local affairs. While certain forms of self-government were permitted to survive, most of their substance had disappeared. Ultimately, even the formal election of mayors ceased in many cities, as they became permanent officials acquired through purchase.

In those provinces (pays d’états) that had retained their Estates or provincial assemblies, the intendants' authority was somewhat limited. These assemblies were composed of deputies from the nobility, clergy, and Third Estate. Such remnants of provincial autonomy appealed little to Louis XIV. He did not, however, abolish the institution outright, but rather deprived the provincial Estates of any real power. The deputies were bullied or bribed into submission. Furthermore, Louis XIV abandoned the old system of allowing the deputies to present the province's grievances before voting on the don gratuit. More importantly, he gave up the custom of asking for more than he expected to receive, then haggling with the deputies through his agents as to the final amount to be paid. From that time onwards, the king demanded a fixed sum which the deputies had to vote immediately, and this amount constantly rose without anyone daring to protest.

== Louis XV ==
When Louis XIV died in 1715, there was widespread distress and discontent in France. The system of absolute rule required a strong king to fulfil its formal and governmental functions. However, the central figure of this entire system, was living in a specific environment. Under Louis XV, that environment was dominated by the court nobility causing the state to move in contrary directions as one court faction or another obtained control. Moreover during the regency of Philip of Orleans (1715–1723) the parlement of Paris regained its former authority with the reinstatement of the right of remonstrance. Although Louis XIV had de-facto abolished the office of Prime Minister, France returned to the model established by Richelieu and Mazarin during Cardinal Fleury’s tenure. When Fleury died, in January 1743, Louis XV returned to the system of his predecessor. This proved to be fatal, however, as he lacked the will and the ability required to govern as a king. By playing one minister or one court faction off against another, he turned the instability within the ministry into a governing principle and gave rise to the spirit that once created the Fronde.

== Louis XVI ==
With the accession of Louis XVI in 1774, absolute rule in France started to unravel. Influenced by his closest adviser Jean-Frédéric Phélypeaux, Count of Maurepas he ordered the reinstatement of the Parlement. Louis XVI hoped that this action would secure peace and maintain his popularity, but achieved the opposite: he handed power back to the opponents of absolute rule and made future reforms impossible. Louis XVI’s support for the American colonists, during the War of Independence which was intended to harm Great Britain, led to high levels of national debt.Furthermore, the returning soldiers (such as Lafayette) brought the ideals of liberty and republicanism directly into absolutist France. By dismissing competent minister for reform such as Turgot and Necker Louis XVI put harmony at the court of Versailles over the stability of the state.The constant struggle with Parlement caused Louis XVI to convene an assembly of 144 notables in order to circumvent Parlement’s obstructionist stance. In doing so, Louis XVI heralded the end of absolutism in France.

== Limits to power ==
The absolute monarchy was not the same as totalitarian dictatorship, and there were limits to the king's power. Known as the "fundamental laws of the Kingdom", these evolved over time and were a set of unwritten principles which placed limits on the otherwise absolute power of the king from the Middle Ages until the French Revolution in 1789. The monarchy had to respect the fundamental laws of the kingdom. He could not change the line of succession at will; he was bound by the Salic Law. He was not to sell royal demesne as the sovereign was considered only tenant of his realm. As the Patron of the Church he was to protect the Church from encroachments of the holy see.

France itself was not a cohesive territorial entity. A number of independent enclaves survived within the frontiers of the Kingdom of France, including Avignon and the Venaissin, Dombes, Mulhouse, Henrichemont, and several others. Additionally, the country was still marked by the presence of exceptional jurisdictions. The Duchy of Bouillon was officially recognised as a sovereign state in law. The Clermontois did not transfer any taxes to Paris and the Boulonnais had its own separate army. Although the old sub-divisions of sénéchaussées, bailliages and syndic perpétuel had lost practically all their administrative significance the authority of the Intendants was never precisely defined and thus varied in many parts of france. At the same time the authority of the central Government was restricted by the independence of the intendants. In the event of an official continuing to oppose its orders, the central government had no option but to remove or dismiss him, though it was rarely prepared to take such drastic action.

Moreover, the large size of most généralités made it difficult to supervise the intendants closely, especially given the intendant’s broad scope of interests in public life. Although primarily a financial officer, the intendant also supervised religious practices, exercised important judicial and police functions, regulated trade and industry, and shared the military authority of the commandant. Despite having all these powers, the intendants never possessed adequate machinery for their continual and effective exercise. At the head of the intendancy bureau was a subdélégué général, and under him was a varying number of subdélégués, who were often accused of incompetence and corruption.

== See also ==
- Ancien Régime
- Early modern France
- Absolute monarchy
- Autocracy

== Bibliography ==
- Alpaugh, Mica (2015). "A Personal Revolution: National Assembly Deputies and the Politics of 1789". The Oxford Handbook of the French Revolution. Oxford: Oxford University Press. ISBN 978-0-199-63974-8.
- Birn, Raymond (1977). Crisis, Absolutism, Aevolution : Europe, 1648-1789. Dryden Press. ISBN 0-0305-3328-7.
- Bluche, François (1990). Louis XIV. Oxford: Basil Blackwell. ISBN 0-531-15112-3.
- Bluche, François (2000). Louis XV. Paris: Perrin. ISBN 2-262-01592-9.
- Cobban, A. (2008). "The Decline of Divine-right Monarchy in France". In J. O. Lindsay (ed.). The Old Regime 1713-63. The New Cambridge Modern History. Vol. VII. Cambridge: Cambridge University Press. ISBN 978-0-521-04545-2.
- Dakin, D. (2008). "The Breakdown of the old Regime in France". In A. Goodwin (ed.). The American and French Revolutions 1763-93. The New Cambridge Modern History. Vol. VIII. Cambridge: Cambridge University Press. ISBN 0-521-04546-0.
- Felix, Noel (2015). "Monarchy". The Oxford Handbook of the French Revolution. Oxford: Oxford University Press. ISBN 978-0-199-63974-8.
- Hamscher, Albert (1976). The Parlement of Paris after the Fronde, 1653-1673. Pittsburgh: University of Pittsburgh Press.
- Hurt, John J. (2002). Louis XIV and the Parlements: The Assertion of Royal Authority. Manchester: Manchester University Press. ISBN 0-7190-6235-7.
- Lough, J. (2008). "France under Louis XIV". In F.L. Carsten (ed.). The Ascendancy of France 1648-88. The New Cambridge Modern History. Vol. V. Cambridge: Cambridge University Press. ISBN 0-521-04544-4.
- Moote, Alanson Lloyd (2015). The Revolt of the Judges: The Parlement of Paris and the Fronde, 1643-1652. Princeton: Princeton University Press. ISBN 978-1-4008-7038-7.
- O'Connell, Daniel Patrick (1968). Richelieu. London: Weidenfeld & Nicolson.
- Richards Treasure, Geoffrey Russell (1997). Mazarin : The Crisis of Absolutism in France. London: Routledge. ISBN 0-4152-4610-5.
- Salmon, J.H.M (1975). Society in Crisis: France during the Sixteenth Century. Metheun & Co. ISBN 0-510-26351-8.
- Spooner, F.C. (2008). "The Reformation in France, 1515-1559". In G. R. Elton (ed.). The Reformation 1520—1559. The New Cambridge Modern History. Vol. II. Cambridge: Cambridge University Press. ISBN 0-521-34536-7.
- Vincent, Bernard (2006). Louis XVI. Paris: Gallimard. ISBN 2-0703-0749-2.
- Wolf, John B. (1970). Louis XIV. London: Panther Books. ISBN 0-5860-3332-7.
