= Étienne-François Turgot =

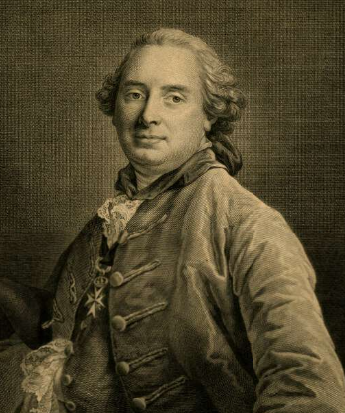
- Born: 16 June 1721; Paris
- Died: 21 October 1789 (aged 68); Bons-Tassilly
- Occupation: civil servant
- Known for: Naturalist , civil servant
- Parent: Michel-Étienne Turgot
- Relatives: Anne Robert Jacques Turgot

Étienne-François Turgot, last Lord of Brucourt, marquis of Soumont, (English: /tʊərˈɡoʊ/ toor-GOH, French: [etjɛn fʁɑ̃swa tyʁɡo]; 16 June 1721, Paris – 21 October 1789, Paris) was an 18th-century French naturalist, knight of Malta and governor of French Guiana.

His knowledge of natural history, surgery, medicine and agriculture made him a free correspondent of the French Academy of Sciences. He was a contributor to the Encyclopédie.

== Biography ==
His father was Michel-Étienne Turgot (1690–1751), prévôt des marchands de Paris ("Master of the merchants of Paris", i.e. Mayor of Paris) and his younger brother the famous Anne Robert Jacques Turgot. He was the father of Louis Félix Étienne, marquis de Turgot.

Turgot was admitted to the Order of the Knights of the Hospital of Saint John of Jerusalem (now the Sovereign Military Order of Malta) as a young man. As a knight of Malta, he commanded one of the Order's Mediterranean galleys. In the 1740s, he fought for Maurice de Saxe in Bohemia and Flanders during the War of the Austrian Succession. He returned to France in 1764 and was appointed brigadier of the king's armies. He established the Académie d'Agriculture in 1760 and was received free associate of the Académie des sciences in 1762.

King Louis XV appointed him governor of Guyana but the colonizing expedition conducted in 1763 at the request of Étienne François de Choiseul, poorly prepared, was a resounding failure. Similarly, because of power struggles, accused of embezzlement, Turgot ended up being the subject of a lettre de cachet.

After his detention, he took no responsibility and devoted himself to study. A gout attack - disease shared with his father and brothers - won 21 October 1789.

== Works ==
- Contribution to the article Coton of the Encyclopédie, 1754, vol. 4, p. 306.
- Mémoire instructif sur la manière de rassembler, de préparer, de conserver et d'envoyer les diverses curiosités d'histoire naturelle; auquel on a joint un mémoire intitulé: Avis pour le transport par mer, des arbres, des plantes vivaces, des semences, & de diverses autres curiosités d'histoire naturelle, Paris, Jean Marie Bruyset, bookseller, rue Merciere, au Soleil d'or, 1758 (Read online); quelques planches.
- Observations sur l'espèce de résine élastique de l'île de France.
- He provided a few texts to Jean-Louis Giraud-Soulavie for the parts of his Mémoires historiques sur le règne de Louis XVI devoted to the history of his brother's ministry.
