= Yaşar Turgut Bilgin =

Turkish businessman

Yasar Turgut Bilgin
- Born: May 20, 1957 (age 69); Kas, Antalya
- Education: Middle East Technical University
- Occupations: Executive director, Author

Yaşar Turgut Bilgin (born 1957 in Kaş, Antalya) is the author of two books published in Turkey respectively called Batan Bankanın Günlüğü, his personal notes about financial crisis in Turkey in 2001, and Kaş ve Meis, introducing the life in two very close Mediterranean settlements respectively belong to Greece and Turkey, Megisti and Kaş. He studied high school in Istanbul Kabataş Erkek Lisesi and graduated from Middle East Technical University with a B.S. in Political Sciences major. He worked at several domestic banks as executive manager.
