= Reflections on the Formation and Distribution of Wealth =

1770 economic treatise by Turgot

Reflections on the Formation and Distribution of Wealth (also translated as Reflections on the Formation and Distribution of Riches) was a treatise written by the French Enlightenment philosopher and civil servant Anne Robert Jacques Turgot. First published in 1770, this work discusses several topics, among them agricultural society, capital, commerce, money, the nature of interest, and both personal and national wealth.

== History ==
Turgot wrote the Réflexions in 1766 for the benefit of two young Chinese scholars who had studied in Paris, Louis Ko (Gao Leisi, 1732–1790) and Étienne Yang (Yang Dewang, 1733–98), on the occasion of their return to China. The text was published in 1770 during not only the height of the Enlightenment, but also the emergence of economics as a distinct social science. Adam Smith's The Wealth of Nations is seen as a key text in economics history - yet Condorcet writes in Life of Turgot that "This Essay [Turgot's Reflections] May be Considered as the Germ of the Treatise on The Wealth of Nations, Written by the Celebrated Smith".

== Summary ==
Turgot's piece consists of 101 individual sections. Throughout these sections, several major themes emerge.

=== Major component ===
The first major component of Turgot's theory is the importance of land and agriculture. For Turgot, his theories and work were often concerned with "the transformation of society from agricultural feudalism to modern capitalism" and the evolution of society from simply farmers focused on cultivation to the emergence of a new capitalist-entrepreneur class. In his Reflections, Turgot notes the importance of an inequality of land among people - thereby spurring excess produce and providing excess laborers, thereby allowing for employment and wages - and the specialization of the land towards certain goods - thereby spurring commerce. Emphasizing the fundamental role that agriculture plays in his economic theory, Turgot writes, "Not only there does not exist, nor can exist, any other revenue than the clear produce of land, but it is the earth also that has furnished all capitals, that form the mass of all the advances of culture and commerce".

Furthermore, another key part of this work was attempting to divide society based on their economic role. Turgot points out the basis of society as the husbandman, the farmer who works the land to supply his own consumption or the raw materials necessary for industry. For Turgot, the husbandman "gives the first movement" and provides the genesis for all commerce and wealth.

=== Two-class society ===
Turgot submits that society originally consisted of two classes: the productive, which he terms cultivators (i.e. the husbandmen), and the stipendiary, which he calls the artificers. The productive class provides societies with the food and raw materials necessary for an economy to function; the stipendiary processes and alters these goods into useful things for society, and through the act of selling these goods can receive the substance necessary to survive. Within the cultivators grouping, Turgot makes further distinctions: undertakers (farmers) and "hired persons, servants, and day-labourers". Within the "industrious stipendiary class", Turgot likewise makes more detailed divisions: capitalists and labor ("workmen").

=== Three-class society ===
Farms eventually generate net produce - that which is not necessary for the survival of the husbandman - which Turgot terms as revenue. From this excess produce, there then emerges a third class in society: proprietors, or the disposable class (due to their disposable, excess produce). In Sections 20-28, he lists several different ways in which this proprietor class may utilize and receive revenues from their lands:

- employing waged labor
- acquiring and employing slaves
- tying people to the soil; bondage labor (for example: descendants of slaves)
- establishing vassalage over others
- engage in sharecropping schemes, such as the métairies system in France
- contracting with farmers whereby the farmer pays the proprietor a yearly revenue from the land in return for allowing the farmer to keep all the produce from the land

=== Commerce and prices ===
Turgot also explores the nature of commerce and the role that money plays in society. Commerce, he claims, began due to people's desires for certain goods that they could not produce or secure themselves, allegedly beginning with bartering of goods. Turgot notes that the value of a good in terms of another commodity may differ from person to person. Through commerce, standardized market-prices for things emerge - the more active the commerce, the more prices will be determined and standardized.

=== Money ===
Money helps standardize these transactions. Yet for money to be useful, Turgot identifies two key properties: it must be able to be used both as a measure and a representation of value. For Turgot, gold and silver make sense as money: these metals are highly valued, their value can change based on the purity of the metal and its weight, and - because of its scarcity - they are valuable enough in small amounts that money based on these metals can be mobile and used in everyday commerce. He concludes this theme by emphasizing the correlation between the prevalence of money and societal development. He writes, "The more money becomes a universal medium, the more every one is enabled, by devoting himself solely to that specifics of cultivation and industry, of which he has made choice, to divest himself entirely of every though for his other wants...It is thus, that the use of money had prodigiously hastened the progress of society". By receiving payment through universally accepted representation of values, people are more readily able to buy goods that they desire yet may not be efficient or able to produce themselves, thereby allowing further specialization of labor in society to those processes that are most efficient.

=== Accumulation of capital ===
Another topic Turgot examines in detail is his perceptions of societal economic and technological advancement, and how capital is accumulated. For Turgot, everything begins with the cultivator, the farm, and achieving the first revenues (excess produce); excess produce represents the first capital. In Section 83, Turgot outlines the various ways that capital can be employed:

- Purchase of land
- Investments in industrial or manufacturing enterprises
- Investments in capital goods necessary to boost agricultural output
- Investment in the establishment of a merchant business to help create new markets
- Creating loans and lending money

Although the various methods of employing capital have different returns, Turgot suggests that there is a relationship between these various uses of capital that influence the interest rate in the economy and return on these investments.

=== Lenders ===
For the lender, the two main concerns are the interest rate of the loan and the default risk of making the loan. Turgot sees no moral issue with a lender of money making money or requiring interest on the loan given that the money which the lender is offering is their own property, nor does he believe that laws should regulate interest rates - instead, it should be supply and demand alone.

Turgot sees the interest rate as an incredibly central and important part of a nation's economy. He writes, "The price of the interest may be looked upon as a kind of level, under which all labour, culture, industry or commerce, acts...It is the abundance of capitals that animates enterprize; and a low interest of money is at the same time the effect and a proof of the abundance of capitals". Beyond the supply and demand for capital, another influence on the interest rate is the culture and economy of the nation: the more a people indulge in luxury, the higher interest rate since that consumption uses up the potentially capital available for lending.

== Legacy ==
Turgot noted a few qualities that would later become fundamental to economic thought, including the principle of diminishing returns to production; in interest theory, Turgot explored important elements such as time-preference and the availability of loanable funds.

Turgot has also been credited as having contributed to economics' understanding of demand for capital. Groenewegen notes how Turgot understood the "[role] of capital in the productive process", how increased industrial activity and divisions of labor have increased the demands for capital investment, and how the investment return to a capitalist is influenced by several factors - among them, interest, depreciation and a risk premium. Furthermore, Groenewegen notes that Turgot's theories on the income and saving relationship was unique among his contemporaries - in particular Cantillon and Hume.
