= Académie d'Agriculture =

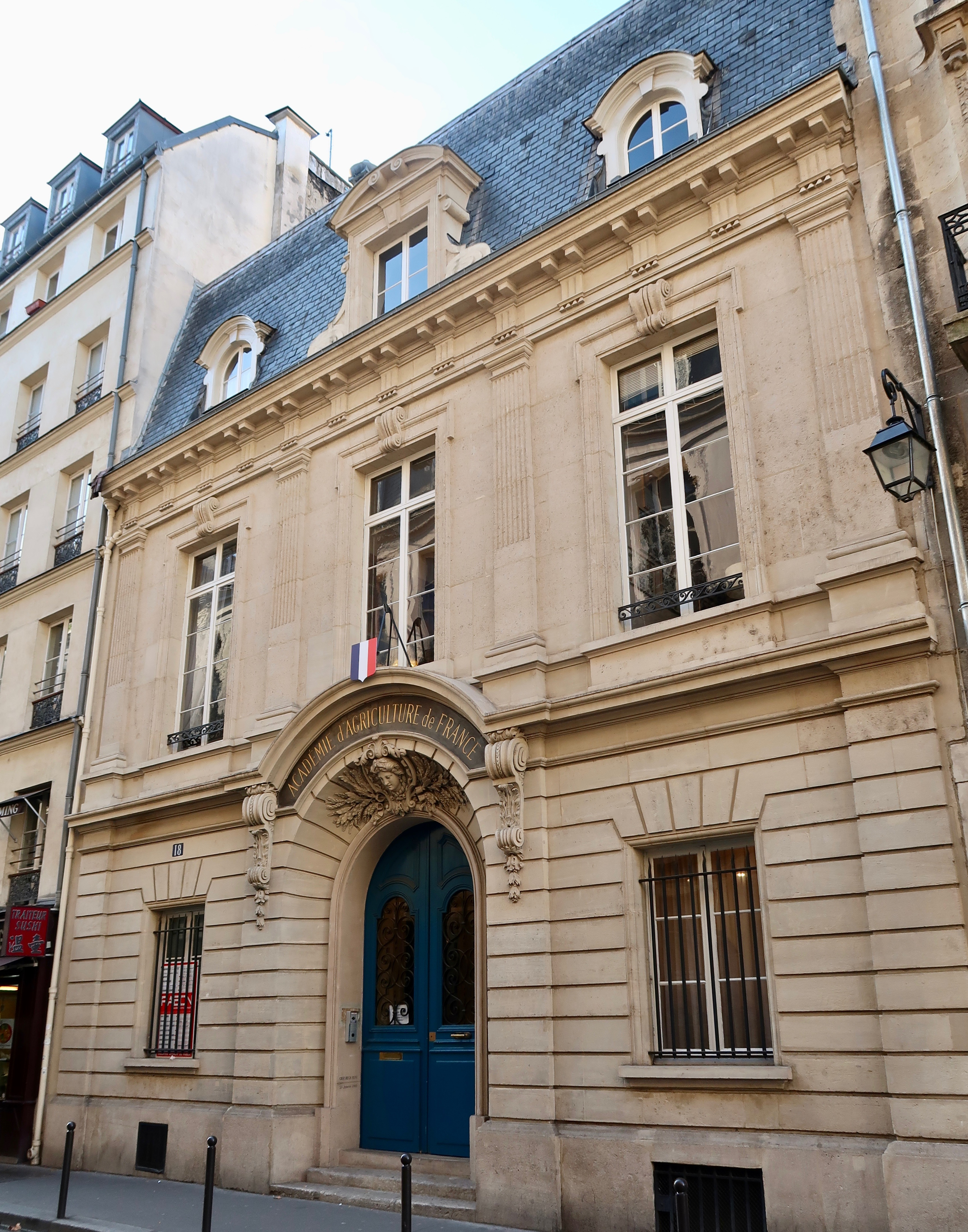
The headquarters of the Académie d'agriculture de France, 18 Rue de Bellechasse, 7th arrondissement, Paris

The Académie d'agriculture de France (French pronunciation: [akademi daɡʁikyltyʁ də fʁɑ̃s], AAF) is a voluntary association aiming to contribute to the evolution of agriculture and rural life in the scientific, technical, economic, judicial, legal, social and cultural fields. It is the successor to the société d'agriculture de la Généralité de Paris, founded in 1761 by Louis XV, and has functioned in its present form since a decree of 1878 which recognised it as a public utility.

It has 120 titular members and 180 French corresponding members, as well as 60 foreign members. Its bureau is its executive organ and is made up of 6 members, with a president elected for a year and a life secretary elected by his or her peers and named by decree of the French President. It awards annual prizes and medals for contributions to the advancement of agricultural knowledge. It is based in Paris in a hôtel particulier at 18 Rue de Bellechasse in the 7th arrondissement.

== Names ==
- 1761 - 1788 : Société Royale d'Agriculture de la Généralité de Paris.
- 1788 - 1790 : Société Royale d'Agriculture de France.
- 1790 - 1793 : Société d'Agriculture de France.
- 1793 : Société d'Hommes Libres.
- 1798 - 1814 : Société d'Agriculture du Département de la Seine.
- 1814 - 1848 : Société Royale et Centrale d'Agriculture.
- 1848 - 1853 : Société Nationale et Centrale d'Agriculture.
- 1853 - 1859 : Société Impériale et Centrale d'Agriculture.
- 1860 - 1870 : Société Impériale et Centrale d'Agriculture de France.
- 1871 - 1915 : Société Nationale et Centrale d'Agriculture de France.
- 1915 - to present : Académie d'Agriculture de France.

== See also ==
- Société d'Agriculture, de Commerce et des Arts de Bretagne.

== Bibliography ==
1. E. Labiche Les Sociétés d'agriculture au XVIIIe siècle, 1908,
2. Émile Justin Les Sociétés royales d'agriculture au XVIIIe siècle, 1935,
- G. Schelle Vincent de Gournay, Paris: Guillaumin, 1897, 300 p.
- L. Passy Histoire de la Société nationale d'agriculture de France, Paris, 1912.
