= Turgut Polat =

Turkish table tennis player

Personal information
- Nationality: Turkey
- Born: 9 September 1993 (age 32) Kars, Turkey
- Height: 1.65 m (5 ft 5 in)

Sport
- Sport: Table tennis
- Playing style: All-round player

Turgut Polat (born 9 September 1993, in Kars, Turkey) is a Turkish table tennis player.

== Major achievements ==
- Two-time Turkish Champion runner-up in cadet level
- Five-time Turkish Champion runner-up in junior level
- Six-time Turkish Super League Champion runner-up
- Three-time University Champion runner-up
