= Anne Robert Jacques Turgot =

French economist and statesman (1727–1781)

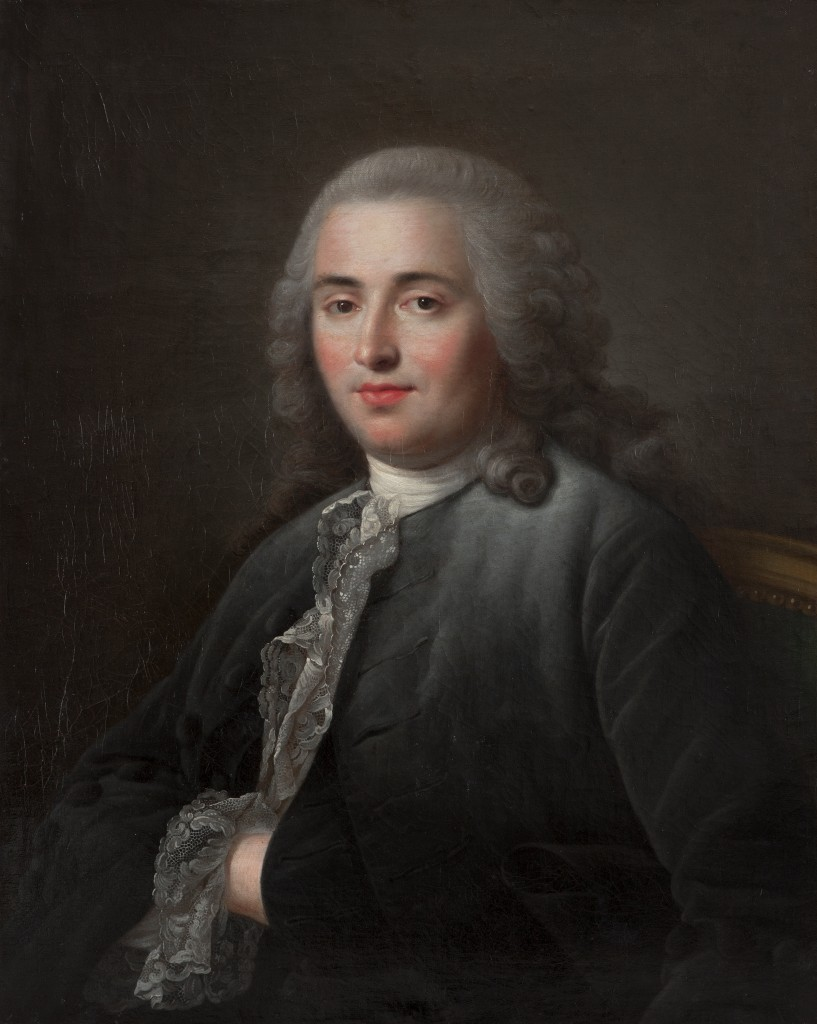
- Portrait by François-Hubert Drouais, c. 1775

First Minister of State
- In office 24 August 1774 – 12 May 1776
- Monarch: Louis XVI
- Preceded by: René Nicolas de Maupeou
- Succeeded by: The Count of Maurepas

Controller-General of Finances
- In office 24 August 1774 – 12 May 1776
- Monarch: Louis XVI
- Preceded by: Joseph Marie Terray
- Succeeded by: Baron de Nuits

Secretaries of State for the Navy
- In office 20 July 1774 – 24 August 1774
- Monarch: Louis XVI
- Preceded by: Marquis de Boynes
- Succeeded by: Antoine de Sartine

Personal details
- Born: 10 May 1727 Paris, France
- Died: 18 March 1781 (aged 53) Paris, France
- Influenced: Böhm-Bawerk · Condorcet · Maistre · Schumpeter · Smith

Academic background
- Education: Sorbonne
- Influences: Montesquieu · Quesnay

Academic work
- Discipline: Political economics
- School or tradition: Physiocrats

Arms of Baron Turgot: Ermine fretty of ten pieces gules, nailed or

Anne Robert Jacques Turgot, Baron de l'Aulne (Note: Also spelled "de Laune" or "de Launes".) (English: /tʊərˈɡoʊ/ toor-GOH; French: [an ʁɔbɛʁ ʒak tyʁɡo]; 10 May 1727 – 18 March 1781), commonly known as Turgot, was a French economist and statesman. Sometimes considered a physiocrat, he is today best remembered as an early advocate for economic liberalism. He is thought to have been the first political economist to have postulated something like the law of diminishing marginal returns in agriculture.

== Education ==
Born in Paris, Turgot was the youngest son of Michel-Étienne Turgot, "provost of the merchants" of Paris, and Madeleine Françoise Martineau de Brétignolles, and came from an old Norman family. As one of four children, he had a younger sister and two older brothers, one of whom, Étienne-François Turgot (1721–1789), was a naturalist, and served as administrator of Malta and governor of French Guiana. Anne Robert Jacques was educated for the Church, and at the Sorbonne, to which he was admitted in 1749 (being then styled abbé de Brucourt). He delivered two remarkable Latin dissertations, On the Benefits which the Christian Religion has conferred on Mankind, and On the Historical Progress of the Human Mind. In 1750 he decided not to take holy orders, giving as his reason that "he could not bear to wear a mask all his life."

The first sign of Turgot's interest in economics is a letter (1749) on paper money, written to his fellow-student the Abbé de Cicé, refuting the abbé Jean Terrasson's defence of John Law's system. He was fond of verse-making, and tried to introduce into French verse the rules of Latin prosody, his translation of the fourth book of the Aeneid into classical hexameter verses being greeted by Voltaire as "the only prose translation in which he had found any enthusiasm."

== Idea of progress ==
The first complete statement of the Idea of Progress is that of Turgot, in his "A Philosophical Review of the Successive Advances of the Human Mind" (1750). For Turgot progress covers not simply the arts and sciences but, on their base, the whole of culture – manner, mores, institutions, legal codes, economy, and society.

== Early appointments ==
In 1752, he became substitut, and later conseiller in the parlement of Paris, and in 1753 maître des requêtes. In 1754 he was a member of the chambre royale which sat during an exile of the parlement. In Paris he frequented the salons, especially those of Mme de Graffigny – whose niece, Mlle de Ligniville ("Minette"), later Mme Helvétius, he is supposed at one time to have wished to marry; they remained lifelong friends – Mme Geoffrin, Mme du Deffand, Mlle de Lespinasse and the Duchesse d'Enville. It was during this period that he met the leaders of the "physiocratic" school, Quesnay and Vincent de Gournay, and with them Dupont de Nemours, the abbé Morellet and other economists.

In 1743 and 1756, he accompanied Gournay, the intendant of commerce, during Gournay's tours of inspection in the provinces. (Gournay's bye-word on the government's proper involvement in the economy – "laisser faire, laisser passer" – would pass into the vocabulary of economics.) In 1760, while travelling in the east of France and Switzerland, he visited Voltaire, who became one of his chief friends and supporters. All this time he was studying various branches of science, and languages both ancient and modern. In 1753 he translated the Questions sur le commerce from the English of Josias Tucker, and in 1754 he wrote his Lettre sur la tolérance civile, and a pamphlet, Le Conciliateur, in support of religious tolerance. Between 1755 and 1756 he composed various articles for the Encyclopédie, and between 1757 and 1760 an article on Valeurs des monnaies, probably for the Dictionnaire du commerce of the abbé Morellet. In 1759 appeared his work Eloge de Gournay.

== Intendant of Limoges, 1761–1774 ==
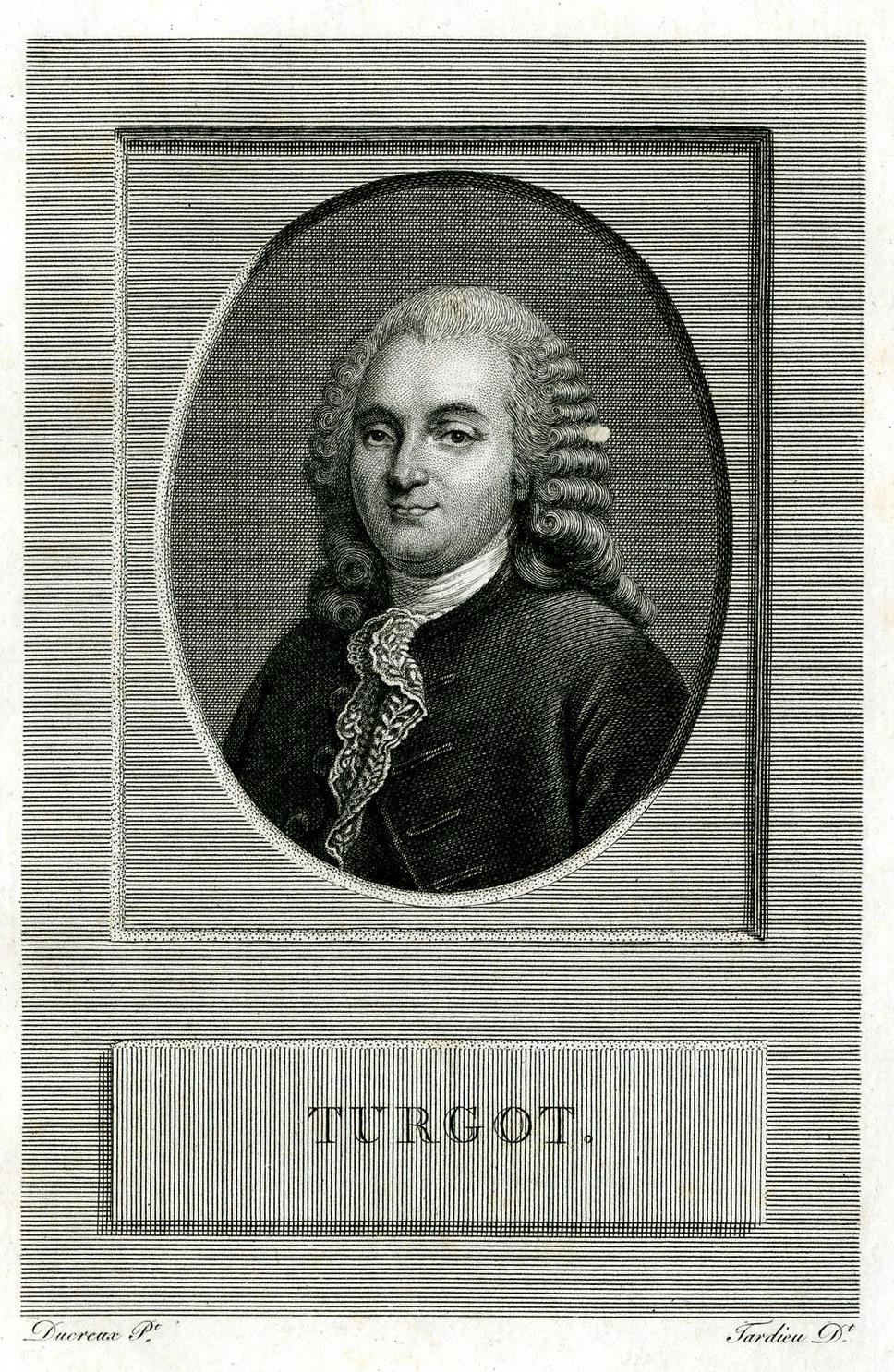
Turgot (by Tardieu)

In August 1761, Turgot was appointed intendant (tax collector) of the genéralité of Limoges, which included some of the poorest and most over-taxed parts of France; here he remained for thirteen years. He was already deeply imbued with the theories of Quesnay and Gournay, and set to work to apply them as far as possible in his province. His first plan was to continue the work, already initiated by his predecessor Tourny, of making a fresh survey of the land (cadastre), to arrive at a more just assessment of the taille; he also obtained a large reduction in the contribution of the province. He published his Avis sur l'assiette et la repartition de la taille (1762–1770), and as president of the Société d'agriculture de Limoges offered prizes for essays on the principles of taxation. Quesnay and Mirabeau had advocated a proportional tax (impôt de quotité), but Turgot proposed a distributive tax (impôt de repartition). Another reform was the substitution for the corvée of a tax in money levied on the whole province, the construction of roads being handed over to contractors, by which means Turgot was able to leave his province with a good system of highways, while distributing more justly the expense of their construction.

In 1769, he wrote his Mémoire sur les prêts à intérêt, on the occasion of a scandalous financial crisis at Angoulême, the particular interest of which is that in it the question of lending money at interest was for the first time treated scientifically, and not merely from the ecclesiastical point of view. Turgot's opinion was that a compromise had to be reached between both methods. Among other works written during Turgot's intendancy were the Mémoire sur les mines et carrières and the Mémoire sur la marque des fers, in which he protested against state regulation and interference and advocated free competition. At the same time he did much to encourage agriculture and local industries, among others establishing the manufacture of porcelain at Limoges. During the famine of 1770–1771 he enforced on landowners "the obligation of relieving the poor" and especially the métayers (sharecroppers) dependent upon them, and organized in every province ateliers and bureaux de charité for providing work for the able-bodied and relief for the infirm, while at the same time he condemned indiscriminate charity. Turgot always made the curés the agents of his charities and reforms when possible. It was in 1770 that he wrote his famous Lettres sur la liberté du commerce des grains, addressed to the controller-general, the abbé Terray. Three of these letters have disappeared, having been sent to Louis XVI by Turgot at a later date and never recovered, but those remaining argue that free trade in grain is in the interest of landowner, farmer and consumer alike, and in forcible terms demand the removal of all restrictions.

== Réflexions ==
Turgot's best known work, Reflections on the Formation and Distribution of Wealth, was written early in the period of his intendancy, ostensibly for the benefit of two young Chinese scholars who had studied in Paris, Louis Ko (Gao Leisi, 1732–1790) and Étienne Yang (Yang Dewang, 1733–98), on the occasion of their return to China. Written in 1766, it appeared in 1769–1770 in Dupont's journal, the Ephémérides du citoyen, and was published separately in 1776. Dupont, however, made various alterations in the text, to bring it more into accordance with Quesnay's doctrines, which led to a coolness between him and Turgot.

In the Réflexions, after tracing the origin of commerce, Turgot develops Quesnay's theory that land is the only source of wealth, and divides society into three classes, the productive or agricultural, the salaried (the classe stipendiée) or artisan class, and the land-owning class (classe disponible). He also proposes a notable theory of the interest rate. After discussing the evolution of the different systems of cultivation, the nature of exchange and barter, money, and the functions of capital, he sets forth the theory of the impôt unique, i.e. that only the net product (produit net) of the land should be taxed. In addition, he demanded the complete freedom of commerce and industry.

== As minister, 1774–1776 ==
=== Appointment ===
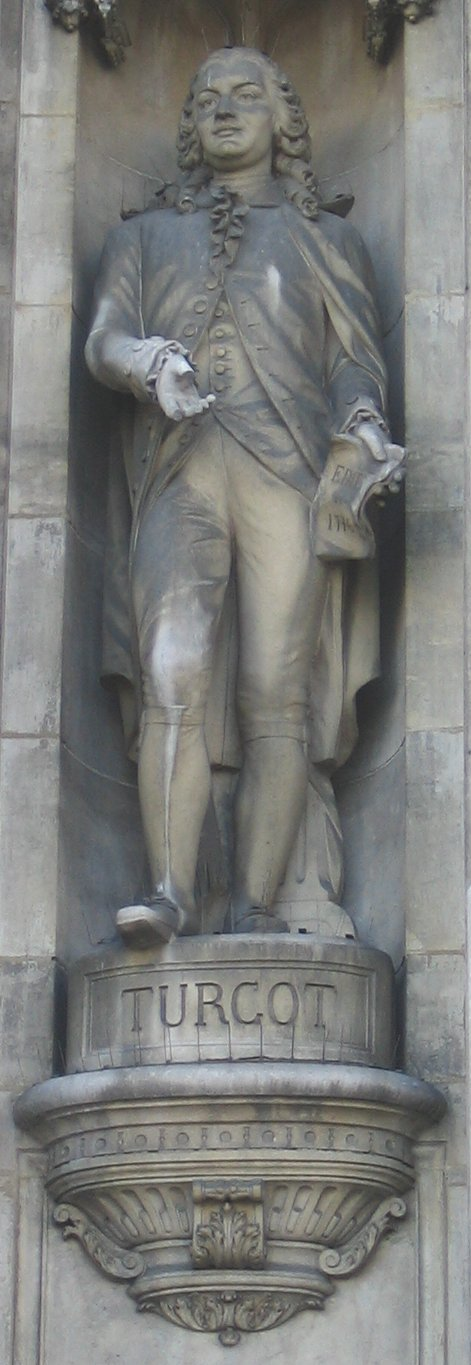
Statue of Turgot at the Hôtel de Ville, Paris

Turgot was summoned to the ministry of Louis XVI two months after his accession, and was appointed a month later as Controller-General of Finance. The king even defended the middle-class economist against the reaction of the aristocracy. Turgot owed his appointment as minister of the navy in July 1774 to Maurepas, the "Mentor" of Louis XVI, to whom he was warmly recommended by the abbé Very, a mutual friend. His appointment met with general approval, and was hailed with enthusiasm by the philosophes. A month later (24 August) he was appointed Controller-General of Finances.

=== On government spending ===
His first act was to submit to the king a statement of his guiding principles: "No bankruptcy, no increase of taxation, no borrowing." Turgot's policy, in the face of the desperate financial position, was to enforce the most rigid economy in all departments. All departmental expenses were to be submitted for the approval of the controller-general, a number of sinecures were suppressed, the holders of them being compensated, and the abuse of the acquits au comptant was attacked, while Turgot appealed personally to the king against the lavish giving of places and pensions. He also contemplated a thorough-going reform of the Ferme Générale, but contented himself, as a beginning, with imposing certain conditions on the leases as they were renewed – such as a more efficient personnel, and the abolition for the future of the abuse of the croupes (the name given to a class of pensions), a reform which Terray had shirked on finding how many persons in high places were interested in them, and annulling certain leases, such as those of the manufacture of gunpowder and the administration of the royal mails, the former of which was handed over to a company with the scientist Lavoisier as one of its advisers, and the latter superseded by a quicker and more comfortable service of diligences which were nicknamed "turgotines".

Turgot also prepared a regular budget. His measures succeeded in considerably reducing the deficit, and raised the national credit to such an extent that in 1776, just before his fall, he was able to negotiate a loan with some Dutch bankers at 4%; but the deficit was still so large as to prevent him from attempting at once to realize his favourite scheme of substituting for indirect taxation a single tax on land. Turgot suppressed, however, a number of octrois and minor duties, (Note: For an account of Turgot's financial administration, see Ch. Gomel, Causes financiéres, vol. 1.) and opposed, on grounds of economy, the involvement of France in the American Revolutionary War, though without success.

=== On free trade ===
Turgot at once set to work to establish free trade in grain, but his edict, which was signed on 13 September 1774, met with strong opposition even in the conseil du roi. A striking feature was the preamble, setting forth the doctrines on which the edict was based, which won the praise of the philosophes and the ridicule of the wits; this Turgot rewrote three times, it is said, in order to make it "so clear that any village judge could explain it to the peasants." The opposition to the edict was strong. Turgot was hated by those who had been interested in the speculations in grain under the regime of the abbé Terray, among whom were included some of the princes of the blood. Moreover, the commerce des blés had been a favourite topic of the salons for some years past, and the witty Galiani, the opponent of the physiocrats, had a large following. The opposition was now continued by Linguet and by Necker, who in 1775 published his Essai sur la législation et le commerce des grains.

=== Suppression of Dijon bread riots ===
Turgot's biggest challenge was the poor harvest of 1774, which led to a noticeable rise in the price of bread in the winter and early spring of 1774–1775. In April and early May, when peasants begged the governor of Dijon for bread, he uttered those famous words that would later be recalled during the French Revolution: "The grass has sprouted, go to the fields and browse on it." Houses of the wealthy were seized and occupied, flour mills were destroyed, and furniture was smashed. Those extraordinary bread riots are known as the guerre des farines, which ominously predicted the coming French Revolution. Turgot showed great firmness and decision in repressing the riots, but also some caution in using soldiers, as he had said that "every levy of soldiers led to a riot." In this, he even had conflict with the royalty, as Louis XVI wanted to go out onto the balcony and meet the crowds to say that there would be a reduction in the price of bread, but Turgot admonished him against this, and the bread remained at high prices. His position was strengthened by the entry of Malesherbes into the ministry (July 1775).

=== On feudal obligations and protections ===
All this time Turgot had been preparing his famous Six Edicts, which were finally presented to the conseil du roi (January 1776). Peter Kropotkin described these edicts as "very modest proposals" and summarized these as "abolition of statute labor, abolition of trade-wardens and a timid attempt to make the two privileged classes – the nobility and clergy – pay some of the taxes." Of the six edicts, four were of minor importance, but the two which met with violent opposition were, firstly, the edict suppressing the corvées, and secondly, that suppressing the jurandes and maîtrises, by which the craft guilds maintained their privileges. In the preamble to the former, Turgot boldly announced as his object the abolition of privilege, and the subjection of all three Estates of the realm to taxation; the clergy were afterwards excepted, at the request of Maurepas.

In the preamble to the edict on the jurandes Turgot laid down as a principle the right of every man to work without restriction. (Note: Turgot was opposed to all labour associations of employers or employed, in accordance with his belief in free competition.) He obtained the registration of the edicts by the lit de justice of 12 March, but by that time he had nearly everybody against him. His attacks on privilege had won him the hatred of the nobles and the parlements; his attempted reforms in the royal household, that of the court; his free trade legislation, that of the financiers; his views on tolerance and his agitation for the suppression of the phrase that was offensive to Protestants in the king's coronation oath, that of the clergy; and his edict on the jurandes, that of the rich bourgeoisie of Paris and others, such as the prince de Conti, whose interests were involved. The queen disliked him for opposing the grant of favours to her protégés, and he had offended Mme. de Polignac in a similar manner. The queen played a key role in his disgrace later.

=== Proposals for a representative government ===
With the physiocrats, he believed in an enlightened political absolutism, and looked to the king to carry through all reforms. As to the parlements, he opposed all interference on their part in legislation, considering that they had no competency outside the sphere of justice. He recognized the danger of the recap of the old parlement, but was unable effectively to oppose it since he had been associated with the dismissal of Maupeou and Terray, and seems to have underestimated its power. He was opposed to the summoning of the states-general advocated by Malesherbes (6 May 1775), possibly on the ground that the two privileged orders would have too much power in them. His own plan is to be found in his Mémoire sur les municipalités, which was submitted informally to the king.

In Turgot's proposed system, landed proprietors alone were to form the electorate, no distinction being made among the three orders; the members of the town and country municipalités were to elect representatives for the district municipalités, which in turn would elect to the provincial municipalités, and the latter to a grande municipalité, which should have no legislative powers, but should concern itself entirely with the administration of taxation. With this was to be combined a whole system of education, relief of the poor, and other activities. Louis XVI recoiled from this as being too great a leap in the dark, and such a fundamental difference of opinion between king and minister was bound to lead to a breach sooner or later. Turgot's only choice, however, was between "tinkering" at the existing system in detail and a complete revolution, and his attack on privilege, which might have been carried through by a popular minister and a strong king, was bound to form part of any effective scheme of reform.

=== American Revolution ===
As minister of the navy from 1774 to 1776, Turgot opposed financial support for the American Revolution. He believed in the virtue and inevitable success of the revolution but warned that France could neither financially nor socially afford to overtly aid it. French intellectuals saw America as the hope of mankind and magnified American virtues to demonstrate the validity of their ideals, along with seeing a chance to avenge their defeat in the Seven Years' War. Turgot, however, emphasized what he believed were American inadequacies. He complained that the new American state constitutions failed to adopt the physiocratic principle of distinguishing for purposes of taxation between those who owned land and those who did not; the principle of direct taxation of property holders had not been followed, and a complicated legal and administrative structure had been created to regulate commerce. On the social level, Turgot and his progressive contemporaries suffered further disappointment: a religious oath was required of elected officials and slavery was not abolished. Turgot died in 1781 before the conclusion of the war. Although disappointed, Turgot never doubted revolutionary victory.

=== Place in the Ministry ===
All might yet have gone well if Turgot could have retained the king's confidence, but the king could not fail to see that Turgot did not have the support of the other ministers. Even his friend Malesherbes thought he was too rash, and was, moreover, himself discouraged and wished to resign. The alienation of Maurepas was also increasing. Whether through jealousy of the ascendancy which Turgot had acquired over the king, or through the natural incompatibility of their characters, he was already inclined to take sides against Turgot, and the reconciliation between him and the queen, which took place about this time, meant that he was henceforth the tool of the Polignac clique and the Choiseul party. About this time, too, appeared a pamphlet, Le Songe de M. Maurepas, generally ascribed to the comte de Provence, containing a bitter caricature of Turgot.

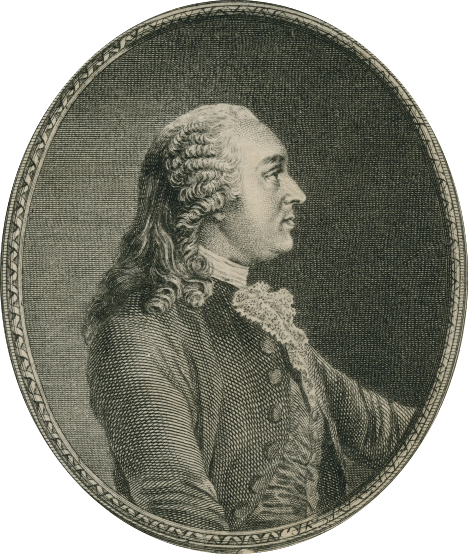
Turgot after a portrait by Charles-Nicolas Cochin

== Fall ==
The immediate cause of Turgot's fall is uncertain. Some speak of a plot, of forged letters containing attacks on the queen shown to the king as Turgot's, of a series of notes on Turgot's budget prepared, it is said, by Necker, and shown to the king to prove his incapacity. Others attribute it to the queen, and there is no doubt that she hated Turgot for supporting Vergennes in demanding the recall of the comte de Guînes, the ambassador in London, whose cause she had ardently espoused at the prompting of the Choiseul clique. Others attribute it to an intrigue of Maurepas. On the resignation of Malesherbes (April 1776), whom Turgot wished to replace with the abbé Very, Maurepas proposed to the king as his successor a nonentity named Amelot.

Turgot, on hearing of this, wrote an indignant letter to the king, in which he reproached him for refusing to see him, pointed out in strong terms the dangers of a weak ministry and a weak king, and complained bitterly of Maurepas's irresolution and subjection to court intrigues; this letter, the king, though asked to treat it as confidential, is said to have shown to Maurepas, whose dislike for Turgot it still further embittered. With all of these enemies, Turgot's fall was certain, but he wished to stay in office long enough to finish his project for the reform of the royal household before resigning. To his dismay, he was not allowed to do that. On 12 May 1776 he was ordered to send in his resignation. He at once retired to La Roche-Guyon, the château of the Duchesse d'Enville, returning shortly to Paris, where he spent the rest of his life in scientific and literary studies, being made vice-president of the Académie des Inscriptions et Belles-Lettres in 1777.

== Commentary on Turgot ==
According to the Encyclopædia Britannica Eleventh Edition:

In character Turgot was simple, honourable and upright, with a passion for justice and truth. He was an idealist, his enemies would say a doctrinaire, and certainly the terms "natural rights," "natural law," frequently occur in his writings. His friends speak of his charm and gaiety in intimate intercourse, but among strangers he was silent and awkward, and produced the impression of being reserved and disdainful. On one point both friends and enemies agree, and that is his brusquerie and his lack of tact in the management of men; August Oncken points out with some reason the schoolmasterish tone of his letters, even to the king. As a statesman he has been very variously estimated, but it is generally agreed that a large number of the reforms and ideas of the Revolution were due to him; the ideas did not as a rule originate with him, but it was he who first gave them prominence. As to his position as an economist, opinion is also divided. Oncken, to take the extreme of condemnation, looks upon him as a bad physiocrat and a confused thinker, while Leon Say considers that he was the founder of modern political economy, and that "though he failed in the 18th century he triumphed in the 19th."

Andrew Dickson White wrote in Seven Great Statesmen in the Warfare of Humanity with Unreason (1915):

TURGOT...I present today one of the three greatest statesmen who fought unreason in France between the close of the Middle Ages and the outbreak of the French Revolution – Louis XI and Richelieu being the two other. And not only this: were you to count the greatest men of the modern world upon your fingers, he would be of the number – a great thinker, writer, administrator, philanthropist, statesman, and above all, a great character and a great man. And yet, judged by ordinary standards, a failure. For he was thrown out of his culminating position, as Comptroller-General of France, after serving but twenty months, and then lived only long enough to see every leading measure to which he had devoted his life deliberately and malignantly undone; the flagrant abuses which he had abolished restored, apparently forever; the highways to national prosperity, peace, and influence, which he had opened, destroyed; and his country put under full headway toward the greatest catastrophe the modern world has seen.

He now, in 1749, at the age of twenty two, wrote... a letter which has been an object of wonder among political thinkers ever since. Its subject was paper money. Discussing the ideas of John Law, and especially the essay of Terrasson which had supported them, he dissected them mercilessly, but in a way useful not only in those times but in these. ...As regards currency inflation ... It still remains one of the best presentations of this subject ever made; and what adds to our wonder is that it was not the result of a study of authorities, but was worked out wholly from his own observation and thought. Up to this time there were no authorities and no received doctrine on the subject; there were simply records of financial practice more or less vicious; it was reserved for this young student, in a letter not intended for publication, to lay down for the first time the great law in which the modern world, after all its puzzling and costly experiences, has found safety.

== Notes ==
Political offices
Preceded by Pierre Étienne Bourgeois de Boynes	Secretaries of State for the Navy; 20 July 1774 – 24 August 1774	Succeeded by Antoine de Sartine
Preceded by Joseph Marie Terray	Controllers-General of Finances; 24 August 1774 – 12 May 1776	Succeeded by Jean Étienne Bernard Clugny de Nuits
