= Michel-Étienne Turgot =

French government official

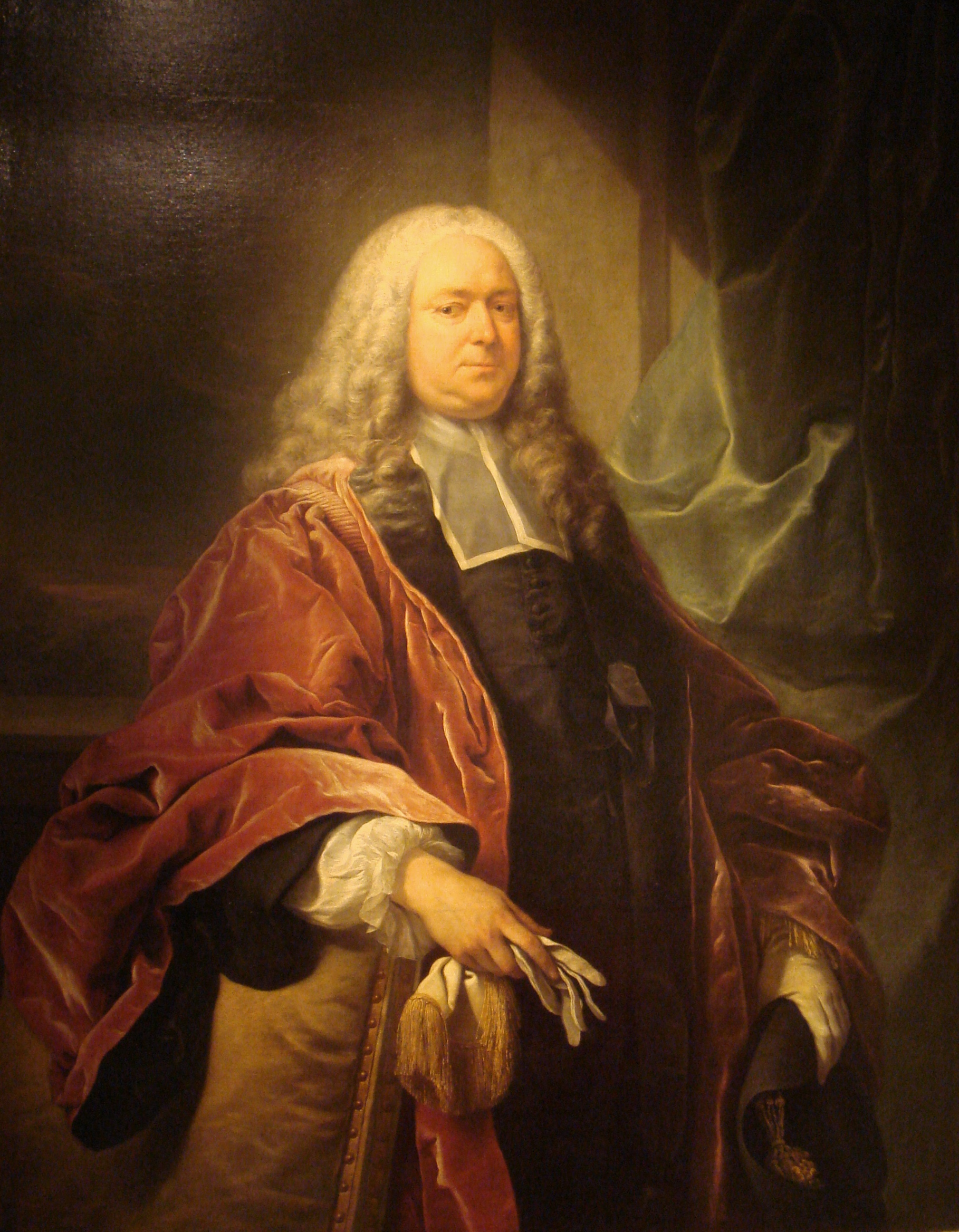
- Michel-Etienne Turgo, by Van Loo, 1739
- Born: 9 June 1690; Paris
- Died: 1 February 1751 (aged 60); Paris
- Occupation: Magistrate
- Board member of: Académie des Inscriptions et Belles-Lettres & Grand Conseil
- Spouse: Madeleine-Françoise Martineau de Brétignolles
- Children: Anne Robert Jacques Turgot & Étienne-François Turgot

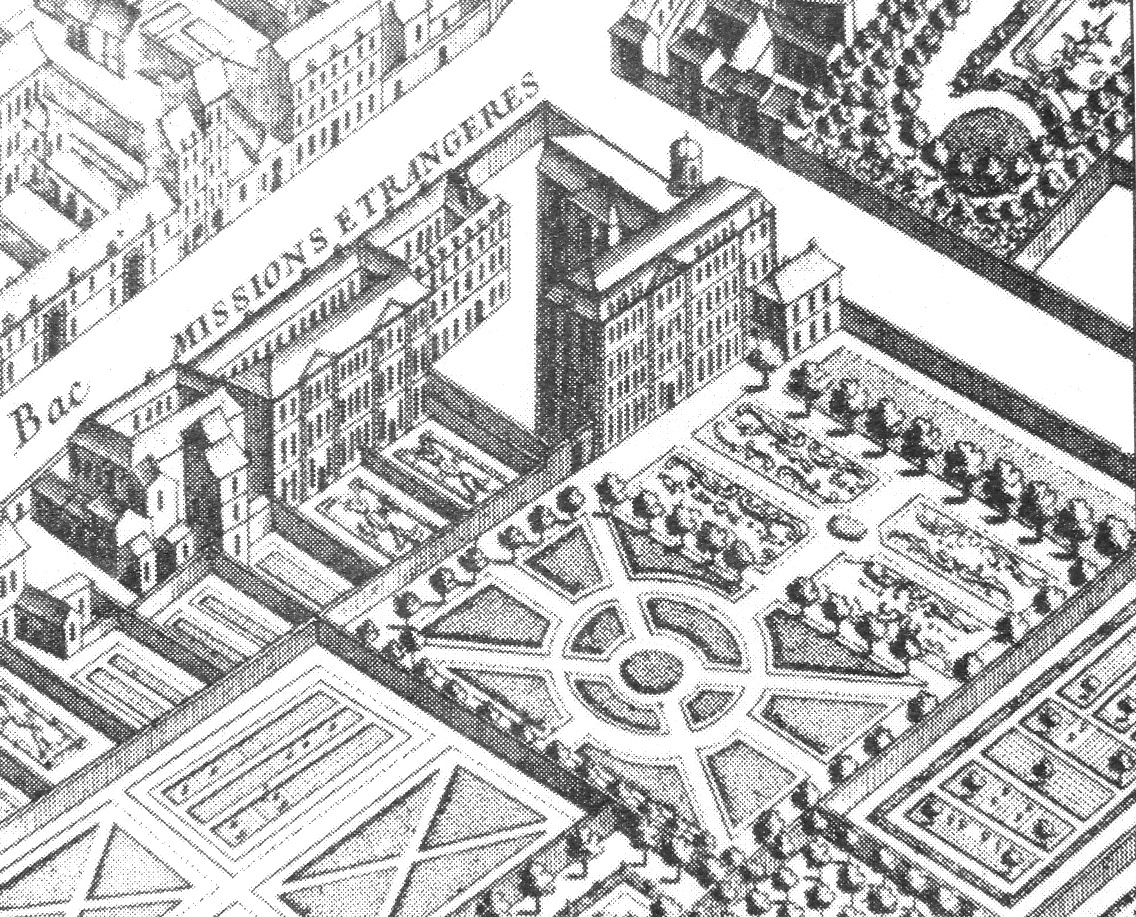
The Paris Foreign Missions Society in the 1739 "Plan Turgot".

Michel-Étienne Turgot (English: /tʊərˈɡoʊ/ toor-GOH, French: [miʃɛl etjɛn tyʁɡo]; 9 June 1690 in Paris – 1 February 1751 in Paris) was prévôt des marchands de Paris ("Master of the merchants of Paris", i.e. Mayor of Paris) from 1729 to 1740. His name is associated with one of the most famous maps of Paris, the "Plan de Turgot" ("Turgot Map"), a detailed bird's-eye view of Paris realized by Louis Bretez from 1734 to 1739.

Michel-Étienne Turgot was the father of the famous Anne Robert Jacques Turgot, economist and Minister of Louis XVI and Étienne-François Turgot, naturalist, administrator of Malta and governor of French Guiana. Son and father were buried in the Chapel of Hôpital Laënnec in Paris.

== Bibliography ==
- Bourne, Henry E. (1905). A History of Mediaeval and Modern Europe. New York: Longmans, Grenn.
- Phillips, Philip Lee (1909). A List of Geographical Atlases in the Library of Congress. Vol I: Atlases. Washington: Government Printing Office.
- Say, Léon (1888). Turgot, translated by Gustave Masson. London: George Routledge and Sons. Copy at the Internet Archive.
