= Edict of Turgot =

French royal edict abolishing craft guilds in 1776

Turgot Edict of 1776

Kingdom of France
- Long title: Edict of the King Abolishing the Guilds
- Enacted by: Louis XVI
- Enacted: February 1776
- Commenced: 12 March 1776
- Repealed: 23 August 1776
- Status: Repealed

The Turgot Edict of 1776 (officially titled "Edict of the King Abolishing the Guilds") was a French law enacted under Louis XVI that abolished the guild system of the Ancien Régime. It was proposed by Anne Robert Jacques Turgot, the Controller-General of Finances, and implemented via a forced lit de justice to compel the Parlement of Paris to register the edict on 12 March 1776. The edict faced widespread opposition and was partially repealed by a subsequent edict in August 1776, which restored some guilds under revised conditions.

== Background ==
The guild system had regulated trades and crafts in France since at least the Middle Ages. By the 18th century, trades were classified into:

- Free trades, without regulation.
- Regulated trades, with official rules but no self-governance.
- Juried trades, organized into guilds with strict privileges and regulations.

Guilds were granted collective rights by letters patent and controlled training, trade practices, and market access. Critics, including Turgot, argued that guilds restricted economic freedom, hindered innovation, and inflated consumer costs.

=== Criticism of Guilds ===
The preamble of the Turgot Edict summarized these criticisms, emphasizing that guilds:

- Created monopolies that blocked access to trades.
- Enforced lengthy and costly apprenticeships.
- Burdened artisans with excessive fees.

These practices limited competition, discouraged technical innovation, and restricted the mobility of workers. Advocates of laissez-faire economics supported the abolition of guilds to promote competition and economic growth.

== Provisions of the Edict ==
The Turgot Edict abolished all guilds and declared:

All persons, of any rank or condition, including foreigners, may freely engage in any trade or profession throughout our kingdom, provided they declare their intent to the local police authorities.

Key measures included:

- Abolition of all guilds, statutes, and privileges.
- Mandatory registration for all tradespeople with local authorities.
- Continued regulation of certain professions (e.g., apothecaries and jewelers) pending further review.
- Prohibition of professional associations and confraternities.

== Implementation Challenges ==
The edict faced significant resistance. Guild Members feared a loss of professional identity and economic security with local guilds publicly protesting by resisting the inventorying assets to liquidate the guilds. The Parlement of Paris objected to liberalization, claiming it threatened social order. A lit de justice was required to enforce the edict.

These challenges contributed to Turgot's dismissal on 12 May 1776, and the edict was partially repealed in August 1776. The subsequent edict restored certain guilds under revised rules.

== Legacy ==
Although short-lived, the Turgot Edict marked a significant step toward economic liberalization. The guild system was permanently abolished by the Allarde Decree (March 1791) and the Le Chapelier Law (June 1791) during the French Revolution.

== Bibliography ==
- Franklin, Alfred (1906). Dictionnaire historique des arts, métiers et professions exercés dans Paris depuis le XIIIe siècle (in French). Paris: H. Welter.
- Kaplan, Steven Laurence (2001). La fin des corporations (in French). Paris: Librairie Arthème Fayard.
- Turgot, Anne Robert Jacques (1844). Works of Turgot (in French). Osnabrück.
