= Parlement =

Provincial appellate court of the Kingdom of France

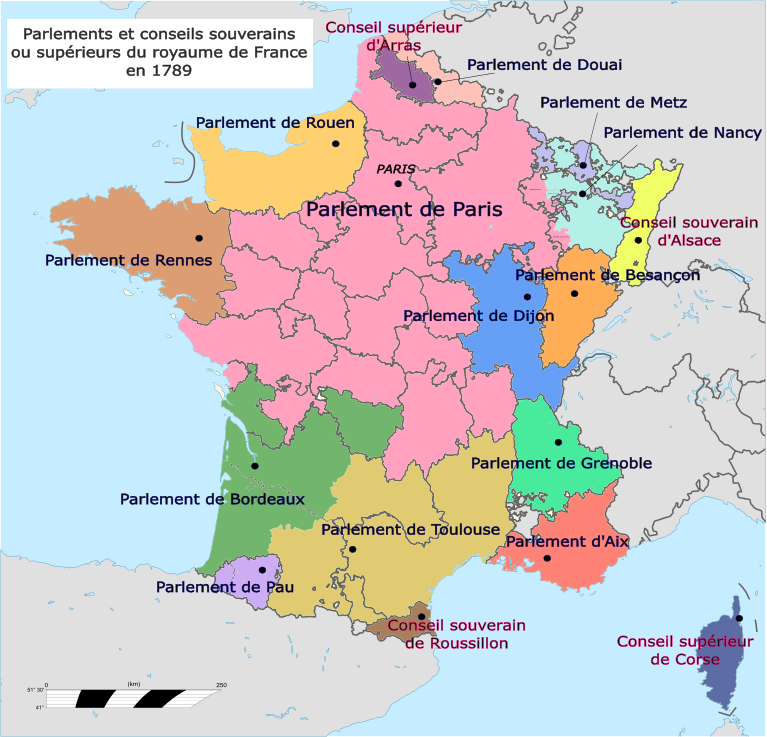
Territories assigned to the parlements and sovereign councils of the Kingdom of France in 1789

Under the French Ancien Régime, a parlement (French pronunciation: [paʁləmɑ̃]) was a provincial appellate court of the Kingdom of France. In 1789, France had 13 parlements, the original and most important of which was the Parlement of Paris. Though both the modern French term parlement (for the legislature) and the English word "parliament" derive from this French term, the Ancien Régime parlements were not legislative bodies and the modern and ancient terminology are not interchangeable.

== History ==
Parlements were judicial organizations consisting of a dozen or more appellate judges, or about 1,100 judges nationwide. They were the courts of final appeal of the judicial system, and typically wielded power over a wide range of subjects, particularly taxation. Laws and edicts issued by the Crown were not official in their respective jurisdictions until the parlements gave their assent by publishing them.

The members of the parlements were aristocrats, called nobles of the robe, who had bought or inherited their offices, and were independent of the King.

Sovereign councils (conseils souverains) with analogous attributes, more rarely called high councils (conseils supérieurs) or in one instance sovereign court (cour souveraine), were created in new territories (notably in New France). Some of these were eventually replaced by parlements (e.g. the Sovereign Council of Navarre and Béarn and the Sovereign Court of Lorraine and Barrois). As noted by James Stephen:

There was, however, no substantial difference between the various supreme provincial judicatures of France, except such as resulted from the inflexible varieties of their various local circumstances.

From 1770 to 1774 the Chancellor of France, Maupeou, tried to abolish the Parlement of Paris in order to strengthen the Crown. However, when King Louis XV died in 1774, the parlements were reinstated. The parlements spearheaded the aristocracy's resistance to the absolutism and centralization of the Crown, but they worked primarily for the benefit of their own class, the French nobility. Alfred Cobban argues that the parlements were the chief obstacles to any reform before the Revolution, as well as the most formidable enemies of the French Crown. He concludes that the

Parlement of Paris, though no more in fact than a small, selfish, proud and venal oligarchy, regarded itself, and was regarded by public opinion, as the guardian of the constitutional liberties of France.

In November 1789, early in the French Revolution, all the parlements were suspended.

== Name ==
The Old French word parlement is derived from the verb parler ('to speak') + suffix -(e)ment, and originally meant a "speaking". It is attested with the meaning of "deliberating assembly" as early as c. 1165, and passed into English with this meaning. The meaning then became more specialized in French during the 13th century, to refer to the "curia regis in judicial session; sovereign court of justice" until the end of the Ancien Régime. (The sense of "legislative assembly" or "legislative body" was used in English, parliament, in the 14th century.)

== Origin ==
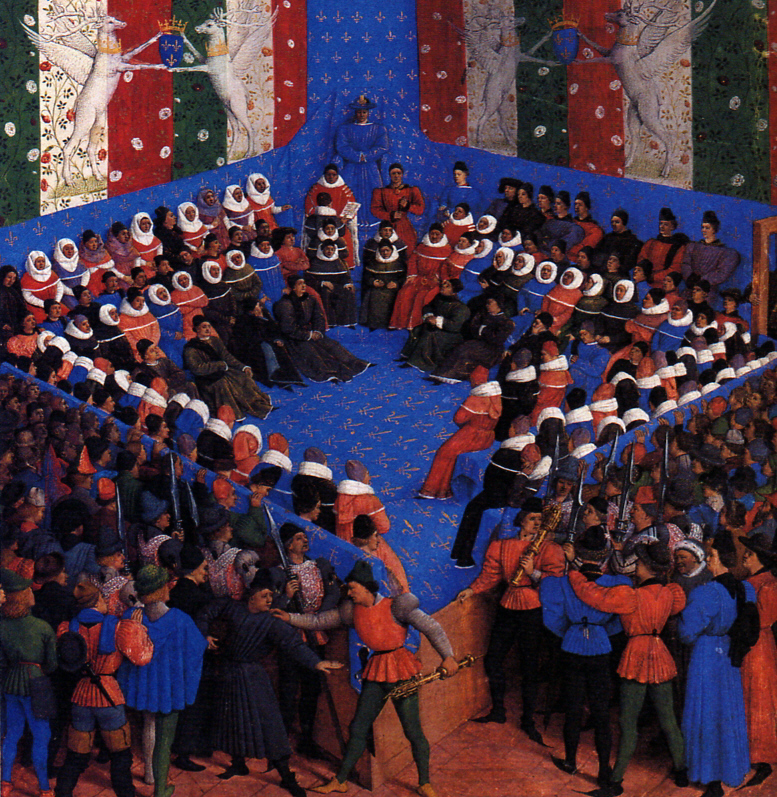
Lit de justice held by Charles VII of France at Vendôme

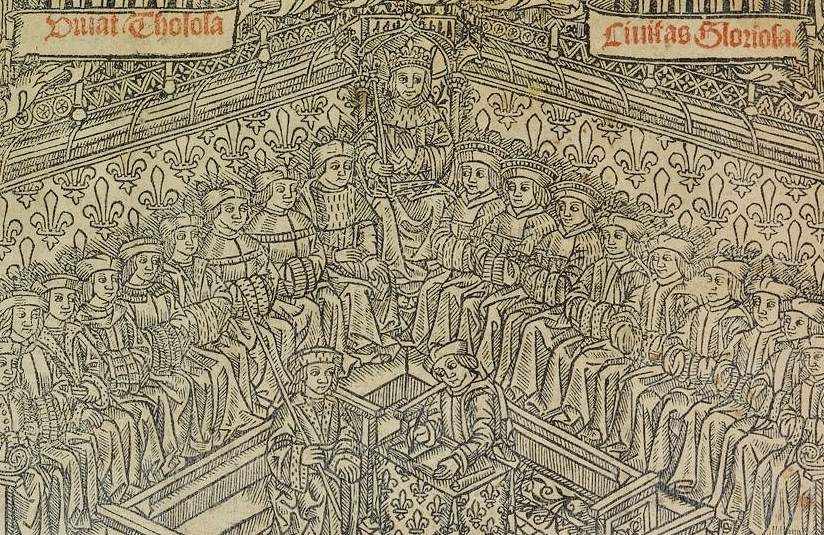
Engraving by Nicolas Bertrand from 1515 showing a session of the Parlement of Toulouse presided over by King Francis I of France.

The first parlement in Ancien Régime France developed in the 13th century out of the King's Council (French: Conseil du roi, Latin: curia regis), and consequently enjoyed ancient, customary consultative and deliberative prerogatives.

St. Louis established only one of these crown courts, which had no fixed locality, but followed him wherever he went.
[...]
The "parlement" of St. Louis consisted of three high barons, three prelates, and nineteen knights, to whom were added 18 councillors or men learned in the law.
These lawyers, clad in long black robes, sat on benches below the high nobles; but as the nobles left to them the whole business of the court, they soon became the sole judges, and formed the nucleus of the present French Magistracy.

Philippe le Bel was the first to fix this court to Paris, in 1302, officially severing it from the King's Council in 1307. The Parlement of Paris would hold sessions inside the medieval royal palace on the Île de la Cité, nowadays still the site in Paris of the Hall of Justice. The parlement also had the duty to record all royal edicts and laws. By the 15th century the Parlement of Paris had a right of "remonstrance to the king" (a formal statement of grievances), which was at first simply of an advisory nature.

In the meantime, the jurisdiction of the Parlement of Paris had been covering the entire kingdom as it was in the 14th century, but did not automatically advance in step with the Crown's ever expanding realm. In 1443, following the turmoil of the Hundred Years' War, King Charles VII of France granted Languedoc its own parlement by establishing the Parlement of Toulouse, the first parlement outside Paris; its jurisdiction extended over most of southern France. From 1443 until the French Revolution, several other parlements would be steadily created all over France; these locations were provincial capitals of those provinces with strong historical traditions of independence before they were annexed to France (in some of these regions, provincial States-General also continued to meet and legislate with a measure of self-governance and control over taxation within their jurisdiction).

=== 16th and 17th centuries ===
Over time, some parlements, especially the one in Paris, gradually acquired the habit of using their right of remonstrance to refuse to register legislation, which they adjudged as either untimely or contrary to the local customary law (and there were 300 customary law jurisdictions), until the king held a lit de justice or sent a lettre de jussion to force them to act. By the 16th century, the parlement judges were of the opinion that their role included active participation in the legislative process, which brought them into increasing conflict with the ever increasing monarchical absolutism of the Ancien Régime, as the lit de justice evolved during the 16th century from a constitutional forum to a royal weapon, used to force registration of edicts. The transmission of judicial offices had also been a common practice in France since the late Middle Ages; tenure on the court was generally bought from the royal authority; and such official positions could be made hereditary by paying a tax to the King called la paulette. Assembled in the parlements, the largely hereditary members, the provincial nobles of the robe were the strongest decentralizing force in a France that was more multifarious in its legal systems, taxation, and custom than it might have seemed under the apparent unifying rule of its kings. Nevertheless, the Parlement of Paris had the largest jurisdiction of all the parlements, covering the major part of northern and central France, and was simply known as "the parlement".

==== The Fronde ====
The Parlement of Paris played a major role in stimulating the nobility to resist the expansion of royal power by military force during the Fronde, 1648–1649. In the end, King Louis XIV won out and the nobility was humiliated.

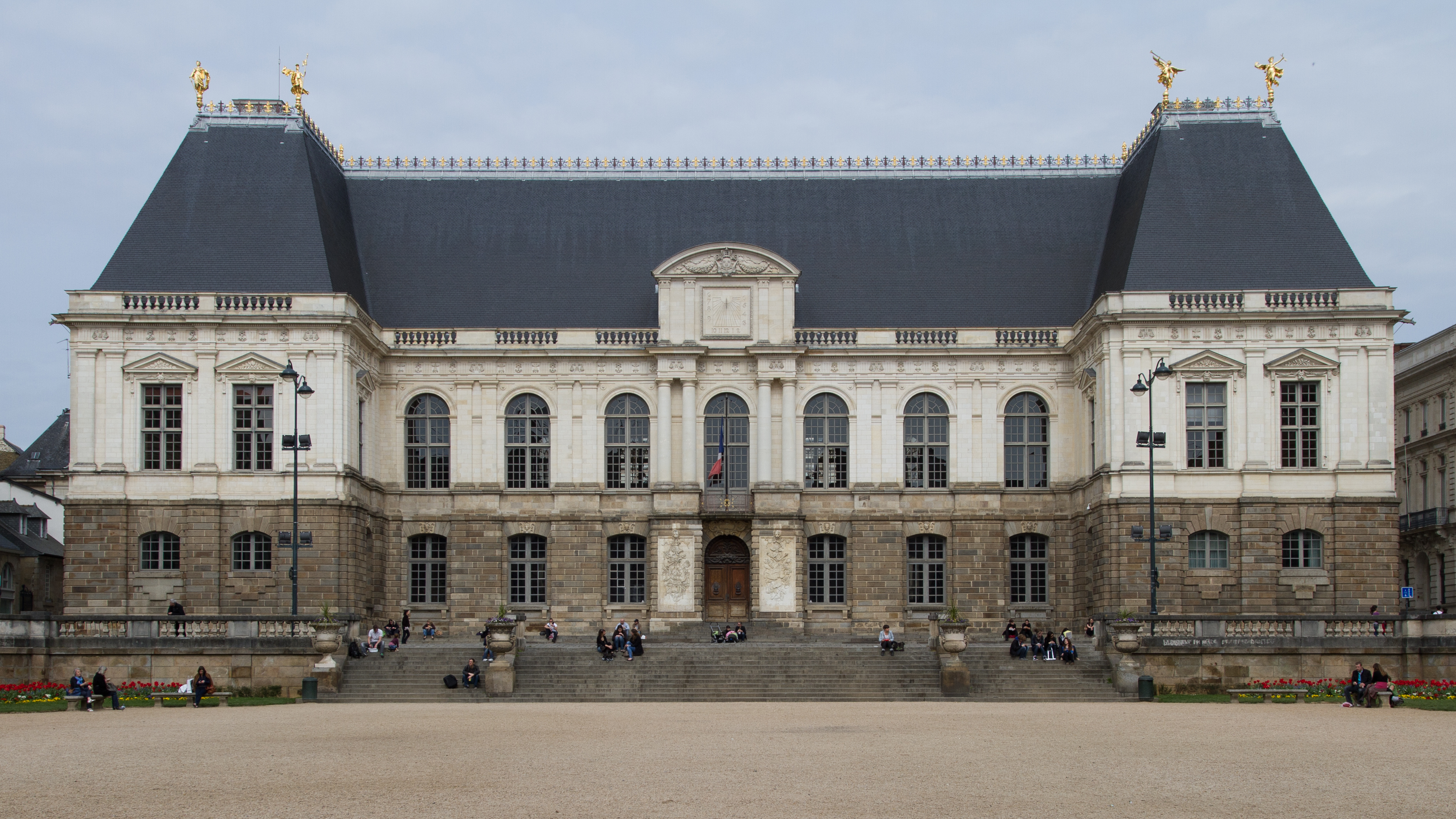
The palace of the Parlement of Brittany in Rennes

The parlements' ability to withhold their assent by formulating remonstrances against the king's edicts forced the king to react, sometimes resulting in repeated resistance by the parlements, which the king could only terminate in his favour by issuing a lettre de jussion, and, in case of continued resistance, appearing in person in the parlement: the lit de justice. In such a case, the parlement's powers were suspended for the duration of this royal session. Louis XIV moved to centralize authority into his own hands, imposing certain restrictions on the parlements: in 1665, he ordained that a lit de justice could be held without the king having to appear in person; in 1667, he limited the number of remonstrances to only one. In 1671–1673, however, the parlements resisted the taxes needed to fund the Franco-Dutch War. In 1673, the king imposed additional restrictions that stripped the parlements of any influence upon new laws by ordaining that remonstrances could only be issued after registration of the edicts. After Louis' death in 1715, all the restrictions were discontinued by the regent, although some of the judges of the Parlement of Paris accepted royal bribes to restrain that body until the 1750s.

=== Role leading to the French Revolution ===
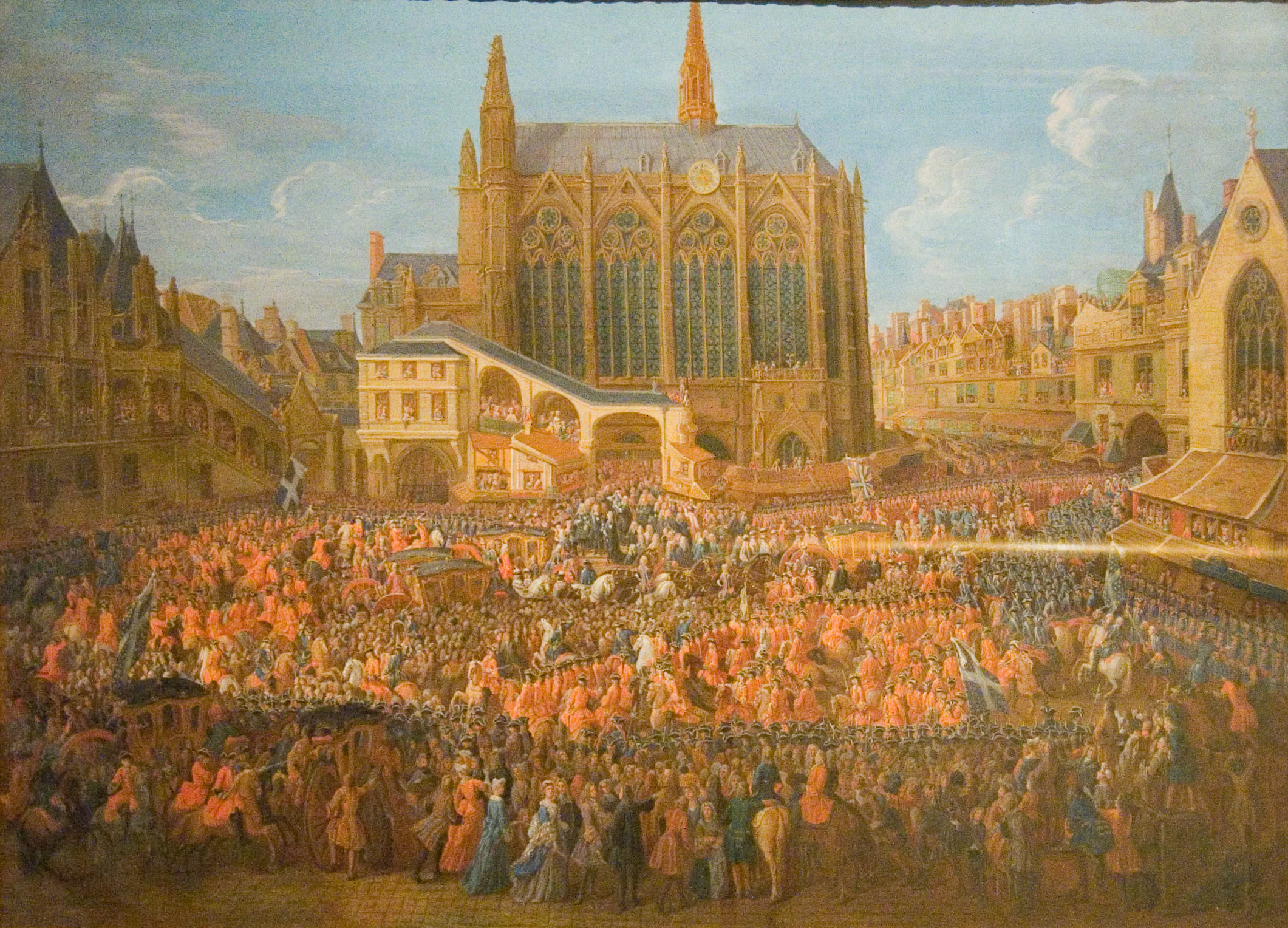
Louis XV leaving the Parlement of Paris on 12 September 1715

After 1715, during the reigns of Louis XV and Louis XVI, the parlements repeatedly challenged the crown for control over policy, especially regarding taxes and religion. Furthermore, the parlements had taken the habit of passing arrêts de règlement, which were laws or regulatory decrees that applied within their jurisdiction for the application of royal edicts or of customary practices. (Note: Among the earliest examples of such decisions had been ordinances rendered by the Exchequer of Normandy by the 15th century.) At a session of the Parlement of Paris in 1766 known as the Flagellation Session, Louis XV asserted that sovereign power resided in his person only.

In the years immediately before the start of the French Revolution in 1789, their extreme concern to preserve Ancien Régime institutions of noble privilege prevented France from carrying out many simple reforms, especially in the area of taxation, even when those reforms had the support of the king.

Chancellor René Nicolas de Maupeou sought to reassert royal power by suppressing the parlements in 1770. His famous attempts, known as Maupeou's Reform, resulted in a furious battle and failure. Parlements were disbanded and their members arrested. After Louis XV died, the parlements were restored.

The beginning of the proposed radical changes began with the protests of the Parlement of Paris addressed to Louis XVI in March 1776, in which the Second Estate, the nobility, resisted the beginning of certain reforms that would remove their privileges, notably their exemption from taxes. The objections were made in reaction to the essay, Réflexions sur la formation et la distribution des richesses ("Reflections on the Formation and Distribution of Wealth") by Turgot. The Second Estate reacted to the essay with anger to convince the king that the nobility still served a very important role and still deserved the same privileges of tax exemption as well as for the preservation of the guilds and corporations put in place to restrict trade, both of which were eliminated in the reforms proposed by Turgot.

In their remonstrance against the edict suppressing the corvée (March 1776), the Parlement of Paris – afraid that a new tax would replace the corvée, and that this tax would apply to all, introducing equality as a principle – dared to remind the king:

The personal service of the clergy is to fulfill all the functions relating to education and religious observances and to contribute to the relief of the unfortunate through its alms. The noble dedicates his blood to the defense of the state and assists the sovereign with his counsel. The last class of the nation, which cannot render such distinguished service to the state, fulfills its obligation through taxes, industry, and physical labor.

The Second Estate (the nobility) consisted of approximately 1.5% of France's population, and was exempt from almost all taxes, including the Corvée Royale, which was a recent mandatory service in which the roads would be repaired and built by those subject to the corvée. In practice, anyone who paid a small fee could escape the corvée, so this burden of labor fell only to the poorest in France. The Second Estate was also exempt from the gabelle, which was the unpopular tax on salt, and also the taille, a land tax paid by peasants, and the oldest form of taxation in France. (Note: In the Pays d'État, the taille was called réelle, based on land ownership, and determined by a council; in the Pays d'Élection the taille was called personnelle, based on the global capacity to pay, and assessed by the Intendant. In both cases, the tax was often considered arbitrary.)

The Second Estate feared that it would have to pay the tax replacing the suppressed corvée. The nobles saw this tax as especially humiliating and below them, as they took great pride in their titles and their lineage, which often included those who had died in the defense of France. They saw this elimination of tax privilege as the gateway for more attacks on their rights and urged Louis XVI throughout the protests of the Parlement of Paris not to enact the proposed reforms.

These exemptions, as well as the right to wear a sword and their coat of arms, encouraged the idea of a natural superiority over the commoners that was common through the Second Estate, and as long as any noble was in possession of a fiefdom, he could collect a tax on the Third Estate called feudal dues, which would allegedly be for the Third Estate's protection (though this only applied to serfs and tenants of farmland owned by the nobility). Overall, the Second Estate had vast privileges that the Third Estate did not possess, which in effect protected the Second Estate's wealth and property, while hindering the Third Estate's ability to advance. The reforms proposed by Turgot and argued against in the protests of the Parlement of Paris conflicted with the Second Estates' interests to keep their hereditary privileges, and was the first step toward reform that seeped into the political arena. Turgot's reforms were unpopular among the commoners as well, who saw the parlements as their best defense against the power of the monarchy.

== List of parlements and sovereign councils of the Kingdom of France ==
1789

Provincial parlements or "conseils souverains" in the Ancien Régime provinces of France. Dates indicate creation of the parlement.
- Parlement of Paris (Île-de-France, Angoumois, Anjou, Aunis, Auvergne, Bourbonnais, Champagne, Lyonnais, Maine, Marche, Nivernais, Orléanais, Perche, Picardy, Poitou, Saumurois, Bailiwick of Bar, Bailiwick of La Marche, c. 1260)
- Parlement of Toulouse (Languedoc and the remainder of Guyenne and Gascony, 1443)
- Parlement of Grenoble (Dauphiné, 1453)
- Parlement of Bordeaux (Saintonge, Limousin, parts of Guyenne and Gascony, 1462)
- Parlement of Dijon (Burgundy, 1477)
  - incorporating Parlement of Trévoux (Dombes, 1523–1771)
- Parlement of Rouen (Normandy, 1499)
- Parlement of Aix-en-Provence (Provence, 1501)
- Parlement of Rennes (Brittany; formerly at Nantes, 1553)
- Parlement of Pau (Béarn and Lower Navarre, 1620)
- Parlment of Metz (Three Bishoprics, 1633)
- High Council of Arras (1640)
- Sovereign Council of Roussillon (at Perpignan, 1660)
- Sovereign Council of Alsace (at Colmar, 1667)
- Parlement of Besancon (Franche-Comté, 1676; formerly at Dole, 1422)
- Parlement of Douai (French Flanders; formerly at Tournai, 1686)
- High Council of Corsica (at Bastia, 1768)
- Parlement of Nancy (Lorraine and Barrois minus the bailiwicks of Bar and La Marche, 1776)
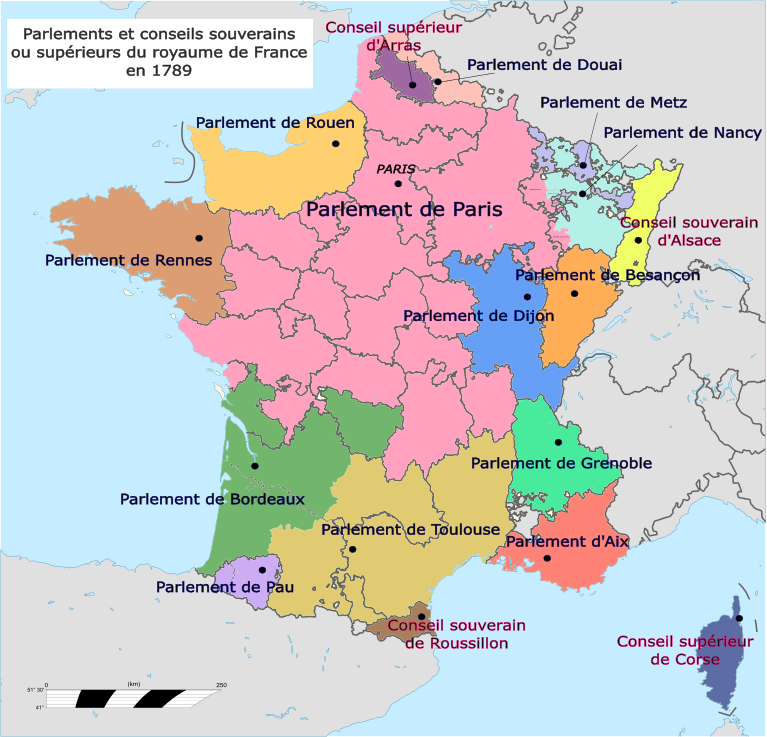

== Judicial proceedings ==
In civil trials, judges had to be paid épices (literally "spices" – fees) by the parties, to pay for legal advice taken by the judges, and the costs of their staff. Judges were not allowed to ask for, or receive, épices from the poor.

Regarding criminal justice, the proceedings were markedly archaic. Judges could order suspects to be tortured in order to extract confessions or induce them to reveal the names of their accomplices: there were the question ordinaire ("ordinary questioning"), the ordinary form of torture, and the question extraordinaire ("extraordinary questioning"), with increased brutality. There was little presumption of innocence if the suspect was a mere poor commoner. The death sentence could be pronounced for a variety of crimes including mere theft; depending on the crime and the social class of the victim, death could be by decapitation with a sword (for nobles), hanging (for most of the secondary crimes by commoners), the breaking wheel (for some heinous crimes by commoners). Some crimes, such as regicide, exacted even more horrific punishment, as drawing and quartering. With the spread of enlightenment ideas throughout France, most forms of judicial torture had fallen out of favor, and while they remained on the books, were rarely applied after 1750.

Ultimately, judicial torture and cruel methods of executions were abolished in 1788 by King Louis XVI.

== Abolition ==
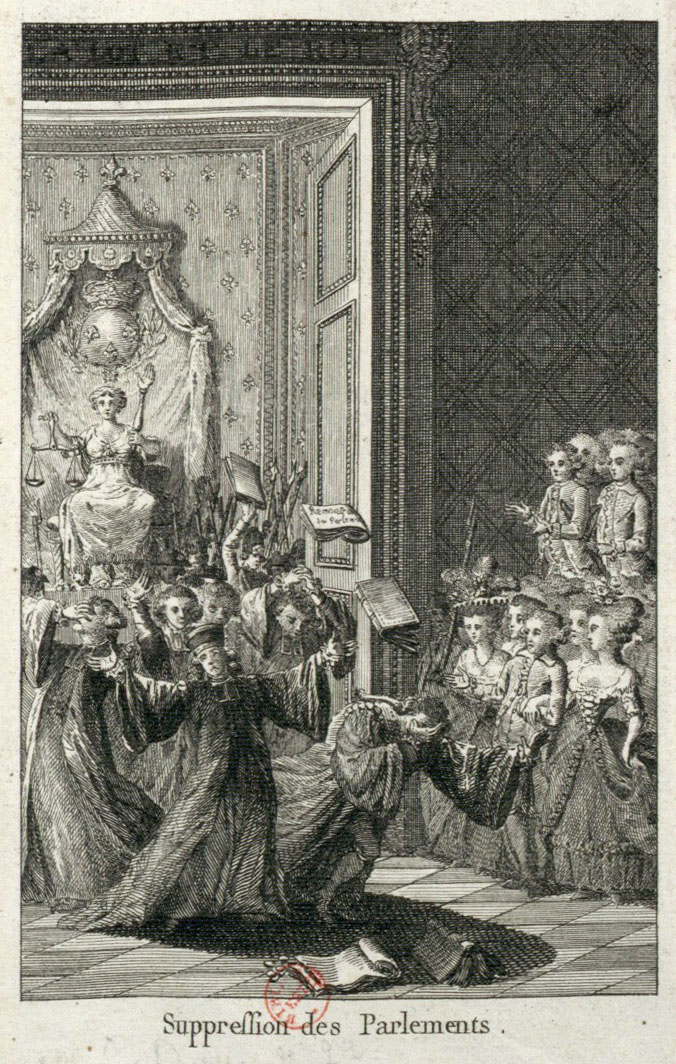
The Abolition of the Parliaments, 1790 print

The parlements were abolished by the National Constituent Assembly on 6 September 1790. The behavior of the parlements is one of the reasons that since the French Revolution, French courts have been forbidden by Article 5 of the French civil code to create law and act as legislative bodies, their only mandate being to interpret the law. France, through the Napoleonic Code, was at the origin of the modern system of civil law, in which precedents are not as powerful as in countries of common law. The origin of the separation of powers in the French court system, with no rule of precedent outside the interpretation of the law, no single supreme court and no constitutional review of statutes by courts until 1971 (by action, before the Constitutional Council of France created in 1958) and 2010 (by exception, before any court) is usually traced to that hostility towards "government by judges".
