= Pierre d'Allarde =

French politician and proponent of economic liberalization

Pierre Gilbert Le Roy, Baron d'Allarde
- Born: 9 August 1748; Montluçon, France
- Died: 9 September 1809 (aged 61); Besançon, France
- Occupations: Politician, businessperson
- Notable work: Allarde Decree

Pierre Gilbert Le Roy, Baron d'Allarde (9 August 1748 – 9 September 1809) was a French politician and legislator known for his contributions to economic liberalization during the French Revolution.

== Early life ==
Pierre Gilbert Le Roy was born into a noble family in Montluçon. As a young man he pursued a military career and became a captain in the Chasseurs de Franche-Comté regiment.

== Political career ==
In 1789 d'Allarde was elected as a deputy representing the nobility of the bailliage of Saint-Pierre-le-Moûtier during the Estates-General. Despite his military background, he focused predominantly on financial and economic issues. He opposed the physiocratic theories of Jacques Necker and Pierre Samuel du Pont de Nemours.

D'Allarde gained prominence in 1791 by introducing a decree requiring accountability for the collection of taxes known as décimes. That same year, he also proposed the introduction of patent taxes. His most notable achievement was the drafting and adoption of the Allarde Decree ( 2 and 17 March 1791). The decree abolished guilds and their privileges, thereby promoting freedom of trade and industry. This decree is considered a pivotal moment for economic liberalization in France, later complemented by the Le Chapelier Law.

== Post-Revolution activities ==
After the dissolution of the National Constituent Assembly d'Allarde retired from politics and ventured into commerce. Following the 18 Brumaire coup, he became the manager of the octroi (municipal tax administration) of Paris. However, his commercial endeavors ended in bankruptcy in 1803.

D'Allarde withdrew to his estates in Franche-Comté and lived a quiet life until his death in Besançon in 1809.
