= Allarde Decree =

French law abolishing guilds and establishing freedom of trade

French National Constituent Assembly
- Long title: Decree abolishing all rights of guilds and introducing trade patents
- Passed by: French National Constituent Assembly
- Passed: 2 March 1791
- Signed: 17 March 1791

Related legislation
- Le Chapelier Law
- Status: Repealed

The Allarde Decree was a decree adopted by the French National Constituent Assembly on March 2, 1791, and formally enacted on March 17, 1791. Named after Pierre d'Allarde, the decree abolished the rights and privileges of guilds and introduced the principle of freedom of trade and industry in France. This marked a pivotal step towards economic liberalization during the French Revolution.

== Background ==
The Allarde Decree was influenced by earlier liberalization attempts, such as the 1776 edict of Turgot which had sought to dismantle guilds but was repealed due to popular unrest. The decree aimed to remove restrictions on professions and trades, allowing individuals to freely engage in economic activities. Pierre d’Allarde defended the decree by asserting that the "right to work is one of the fundamental rights of man."

The decree complemented the Le Chapelier Law of June 1791, which further prohibited worker associations and guilds, fostering a capitalist labor market.

== Provisions ==
The decree, particularly its Article 7, enshrined the principle of freedom of trade and industry:

It shall be free for any person to engage in such trade or profession as they see fit; however, they must first obtain a patente tax, pay its cost as determined, and adhere to public order regulations.

The Allarde Decree introduced two major principles:

- Freedom of enterprise: Individuals could freely create businesses and engage in professions without guild restrictions.
- Free competition: Economic actors were expected to compete fairly without interference, establishing the foundation for market economy practices.

While it granted economic freedoms, the decree also allowed public authorities to regulate activities in the interest of public order and general welfare.

== Impact ==
The Allarde Decree played a significant role in dismantling the corporatist structures of the Ancien Régime, paving the way for modern capitalism in France. It abolished the monopoly powers of guilds, fostering an open market economy. This economically liberal approach became a cornerstone of French economic policies.

However, the decree also eliminated the social safety nets provided by guilds, leaving workers vulnerable to exploitation in the newly competitive economy. The subsequent Le Chapelier Law exacerbated this vulnerability by banning trade unions and collective bargaining.

== Legacy ==
The decree's principles of economic freedom have been enshrined in French law and jurisprudence, influencing modern regulatory frameworks. Despite its repeal in some jurisdictions, the Allarde Decree remains a landmark in the history of economic liberalization.

The decree faced criticism during the Vichy regime, which attempted to reinstate corporatist policies through the 1941 Charte du travail.
