= Caesarism =

Political philosophy inspired by Julius Caesar

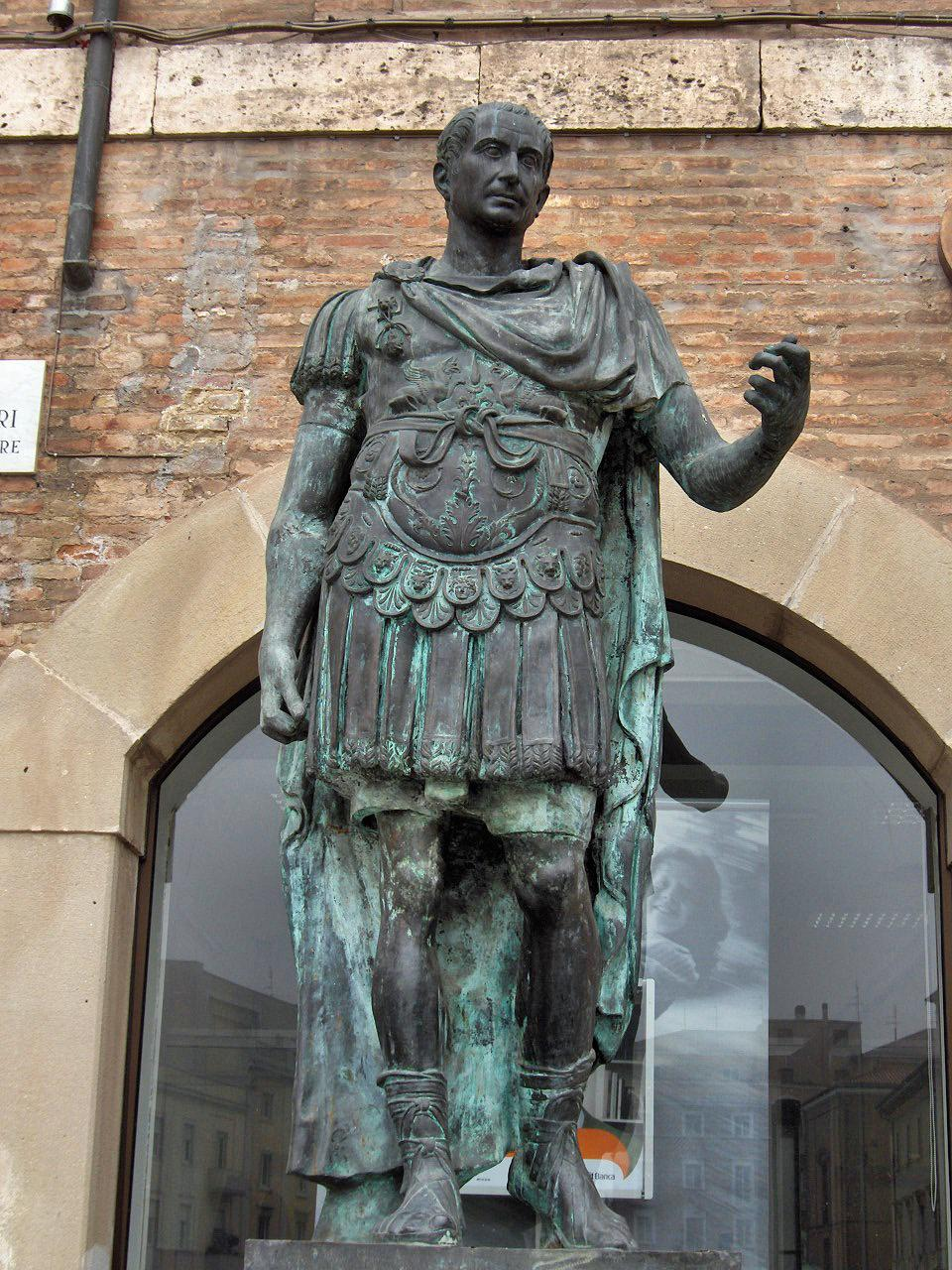
A statue of Julius Caesar, in the city of Rimini, Italy

In political science, the term Caesarism identifies and describes an authoritarian, populist, and autocratic form of politics inspired by Julius Caesar, the dictator of Rome, from 49 BC to 44 BC.

== History ==
The German historian Johann Friedrich Böhmer first used the term Caesarism in 1846, to describe the state's political subordination of the Roman Catholic Church. Published in 1850, L'ère des Césars by Auguste Romieu defined Caesarism as the military rule and régime of a warlord, and "following Romieu's polemic, 'Caesarism' quickly gained vogue status." In 1857, the religious writer Orestes Brownson used the term Caesarism to mean rule and régime of absolute monarchy. In 1858, the mainstream usage of the term occurs in a Westminster Review article of political criticism about the "clumsy eulogies of Caesarism as [being] incarnate in the dynasty of Bonaparte".

As an admirer of Julius Caesar, Napoléon Bonaparte espoused Caesarism as a justification of his rule and régime of France. Napoleon III's policy under the Second French Empire, which combined an authoritarian regime and a proactive social policy, notably with the Ollivier law of 1864, can be described as a form of "social Caesarism". According to historian Louis Girard (historian), this policy aims in particular to rally the workers to the regime in the face of hostile liberal bosses.

Benjamin Disraeli was accused of Caesarism in March 1878 when, in anticipation of war with Russia, he mobilised British reserves and called Indian troops to Malta. G. K. Chesterton made one of the most ringing denunciations of Caesarism in his work Heretics, calling it "the worst form of slavery".

Sociologist Max Weber believed that every mass democracy went in a Caesarist direction. Professor of law Gerhard Casper writes, "Weber employed the term to stress, inter alia, the plebiscitary character of elections, disdain for parliament, the non-toleration of autonomous powers within the government and a failure to attract or suffer independent political minds."

== 20th century ==
A so-called "democratic" form of Caesarism has been advocated by theorists like Venezuela's Laureano Vallenilla Lanz in Cesarismo Democrático (1919). Italian Duce Benito Mussolini and the ideology of Italian fascism espoused Caesarism.

Antonio Gramsci stated that the roots of Caesarism lie at the level of a "crisis of authority," which is also a crisis of representation that occurs when social groups no longer identify with political parties. These then become anachronistic, allowing a Caesarist solution to emerge. In the Italian case, Gramsci locates the causes of this socio-political disintegration in the destabilizing experience of the First World War, where the large peasant masses were forced to fight. At the same time, they had been passive during the Risorgimento. Caesarism is a macro-social phenomenon and cannot be driven by the emergence of an individual; this phenomenon, therefore, fulfills a political function. Furthermore, Gramsci evokes the possibility of a "Caesarism without Caesar" but implemented by a group like the British National Government bringing together the Conservatives and Labour.

Oswald Spengler described Caesarism as a final phase of modernity that would succeed democracy.

== 21st century ==
According to French historian Christian-Georges Schwentzel in the 21st century, American President Donald Trump, Russian President Vladimir Putin and Turkish President Recep Tayyip Erdoğan partly took over this Caesarean model by adapting it, responding at the same time to a desire for authority and grandeur emanating from their peoples. In the 2020s, parts of the American right-wing, especially those associated with the Claremont Institute think tank, have advocated for "Red Caesarism" as an authoritarian solution to problems facing the US.

== See also ==
- Bonapartism
- Caudillo
- Caesaropapism
- Cult of personality
- Italian fascism
- The Decline of the West
- Stratocracy
- Strongman (politics)
- Third Rome
- Trumpism
