= Contribution des patentes =

Direct tax historically levied in France and other countries

The patente (or contribution des patentes) is a form of direct tax historically levied on individuals or entities engaged in economic, commercial, industrial, or professional activities. It is calculated as a fixed amount or as a percentage of the taxpayer's revenue, depending on the jurisdiction and the type of business activity.

== History ==
The patente was first introduced in France by the Allarde Decree of March 2 and 17, 1791, which abolished the guilds and established the principle of freedom of commerce and industry. Initially, the tax was levied on presumed income based on industrial rents. The tax calculation was modified multiple times by subsequent legislation.

In 1844, a major reform split the tax into a fixed component based on the size of the municipality and a proportional component tied to the rental value of the premises.

The patente was adopted in other parts of the world, particularly in former French colonies, where the French fiscal system was replicated.

=== In France ===
In France, the patente was abolished in 1975 by Law No. 75-678 and replaced by the Professional Tax starting January 1, 1976. The professional tax itself was replaced in 2010 by the Contribution économique territoriale (CET) under the Finance Act of 2010.

==== Mainland France and Overseas Regions ====
The patente was replaced by the professional tax in mainland France and the overseas departments and regions. The professional tax was further replaced in 2010 by the CET and the IFER (Imposition Forfaitaire des Entreprises de Réseaux).

==== Overseas Collectivities ====
The patente remains in force in some French overseas collectivities, such as French Polynesia and New Caledonia. Its structure mirrors the reformed patente system of 1844, consisting of a fixed charge based on geographical location and a variable charge proportional to the rental value of the establishment.

=== Other Countries ===
==== Guinea ====
In Guinea, the patente tax includes:

- A fixed fee.
- A proportional fee based on the rental value of professional premises.

These fees are determined by general or special tariffs depending on the profession and are detailed in annexed schedules. Activities not specifically listed are still subject to the tax based on analogous professions.

==== Cameroon ====
In Cameroon, the patente is calculated based on the previous year’s turnover. It is collected for the benefit of local authorities and the CRTV. Special rules apply to transportation companies and gas station operators, with the tax determined by criteria such as vehicle capacity or profit margins.

==== Djibouti ====
In Djibouti, the patente comprises a fixed charge (varying by location and establishment size) and a variable charge proportional to the rental value. Special provisions exist for taxis.
