= Waldeck-Rousseau Law =

The Law on the Creation of Professional Syndicates, known as the Waldeck-Rousseau Law, allowed legalised trade unions in France. Passed on March 21, 1884, it supplanted the Ollivier law and legalized trade unions. It is now integrated into the Labor Code.

The Law on the Creation of Professional Syndicates, known as the Waldeck-Rousseau Law after Pierre Waldeck-Rousseau, the republican Minister of the Interior who advocated for its adoption, is a French law passed on 21. It followed the Ollivier law of the Second French Empire of 25 May 1864 which decriminalized workers' coalitions.

The law authorized the establishment of trade unions in France, repealing the restrictive Le Chapelier Law, and defined their competencies. The text applies to all professional groups, encompassing both employee unions and employer unions. It has since been incorporated into the French Labour Code.
