= Parlement of Paris =

French appellate court, 1200s–1790

- Parlement de Paris
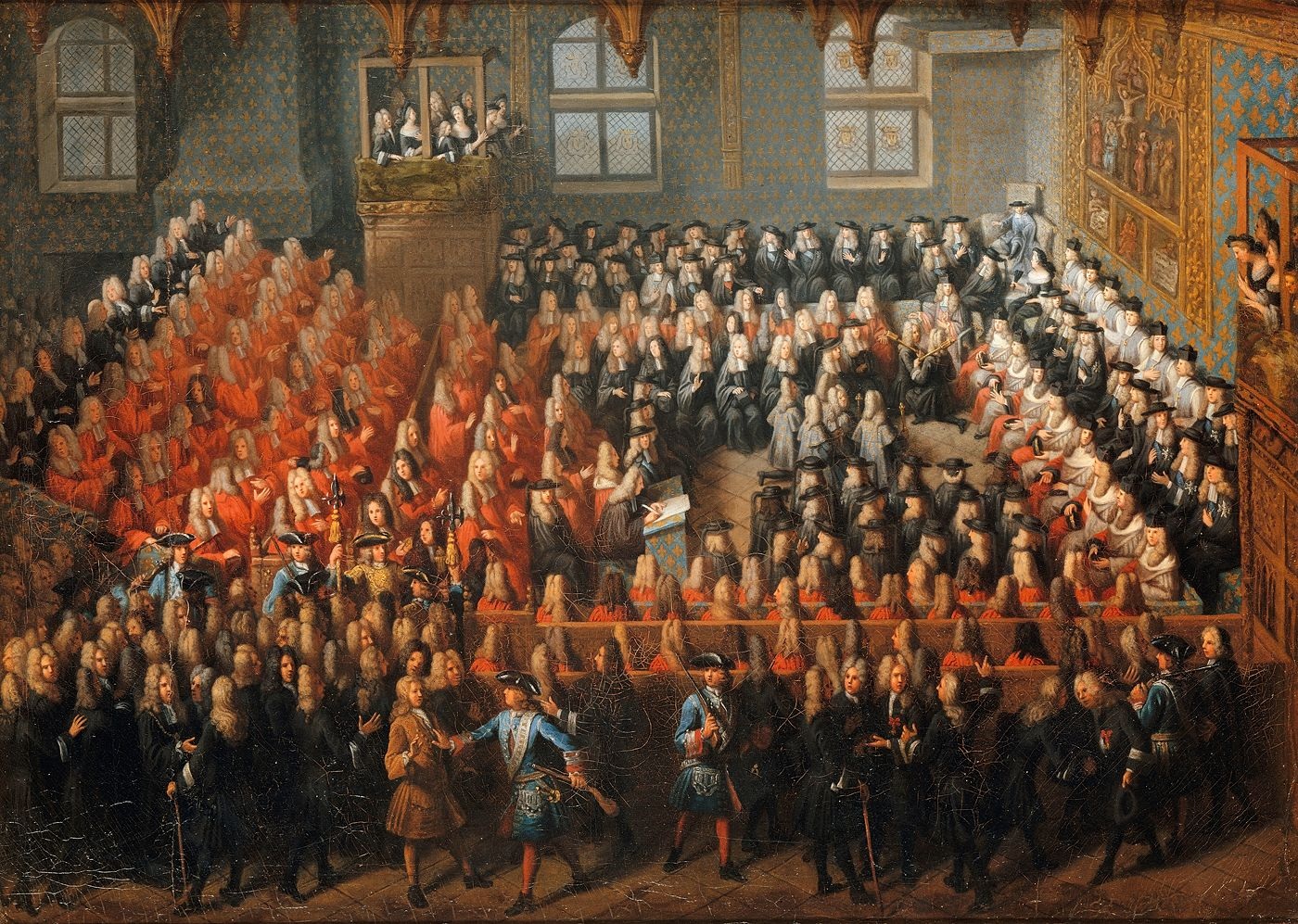
- Lit de justice held by Louis XV at the Parlement of Paris in 1715
- Established: 1250
- Dissolved: 6 September 1790
- Location: Palais de la Cité, Paris
- Language: French

Division map
- Jurisdiction in 1789

The Parlement of Paris (French: Parlement de Paris) was the oldest parlement in the Kingdom of France, formed in the 14th century. Parlements were judicial, rather than legislative, bodies and were composed of magistrates. Though not representative bodies in the present sense of the word, they had procedures and authorities that could delay the otherwise unchecked power of the King. Because of its location and history, the Parlement of Paris was the most significant. The Parlement of Paris was established under Philip IV of France in 1302. The Parlement of Paris would hold sessions inside the medieval royal palace on the Île de la Cité, which today is the site of the Paris Hall of Justice.

== History ==
In 1589, Paris was effectively in the hands of the Catholic League. To escape, Henry IV of France summoned the parlement of Paris to meet at Tours, but only a small faction of its parliamentarians accepted the summons. (Henry also held a parliament at Châlons, a town remaining faithful to the king, known as the Parliament of Châlons.) Following the assassination of Henry III of France by the Dominican lay brother Jacques Clément, the "Parliament of Tours" continued to sit during the first years of Henry IV's reign. The royalist members of the other provincial parlements also split off—the royalist members of the Parlement of Rouen seceded to Caen, those in the Parlement of Toulouse to Carcassonne, and those of Parlement of Dijon to Semur and to Flavigny.

The Parlement of Paris played a major role in stimulating the nobility to resist the expansion of royal power by military force in the Parliamentary Fronde, 1648–1649. In the end, King Louis XIV won out and the nobility was humiliated.

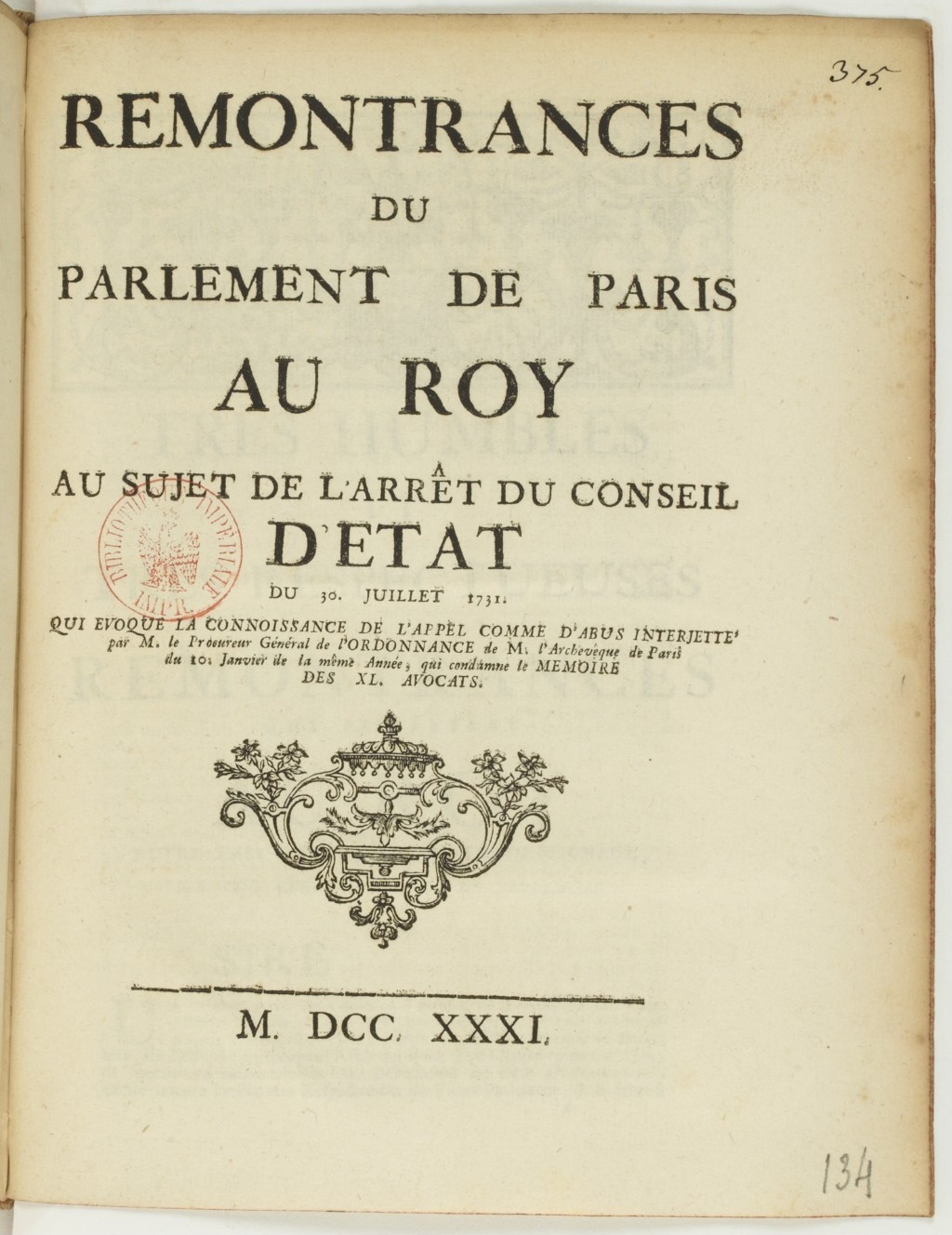

=== Role leading to the French Revolution ===
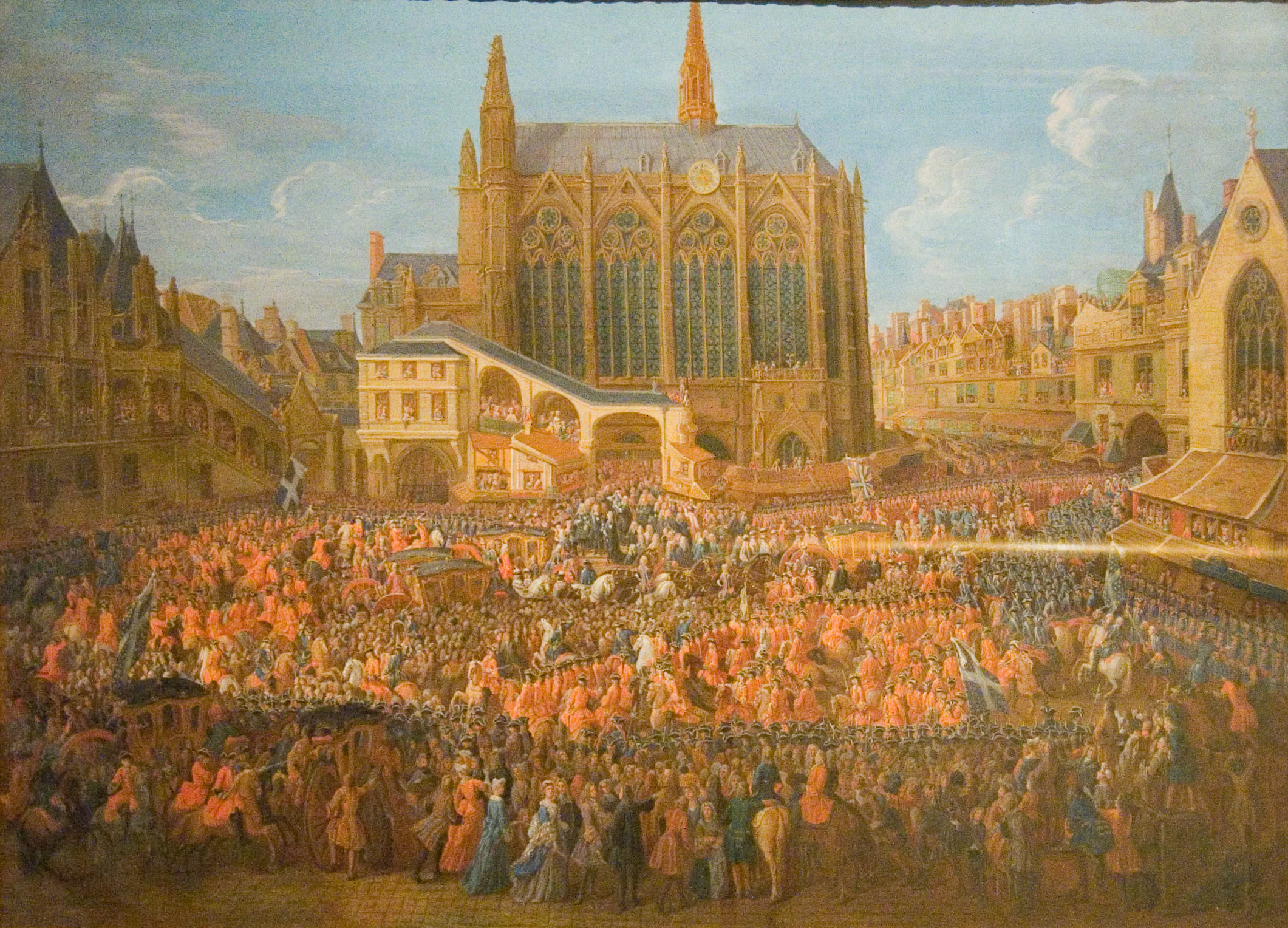
Louis XV leaving the Parlement of Paris on 12 September 1715

At a session of the parlement of Paris on 3 March 1766 known as la Séance de la Flagellation ("the Flagellation Session"), Louis XV asserted that sovereign power resided in his person.

The beginning of the proposed radical changes began with the protests of the Parlement of Paris addressed to Louis XVI in March 1776, in which the Second Estate, the nobility, resisted the beginning of certain reforms that would remove their privileges, notably their exemption from taxes. The objections were made in reaction to the essay, Réflexions sur la formation et la distribution des richesses ("Reflections on the Formation and Distribution of Wealth") by Anne Robert Jacques Turgot. The Second Estate reacted to the essay with anger to convince the king that the nobility still served a very important role and still deserved the same privileges of tax exemption as well as for the preservation of the guilds and corporations put in place to restrict trade, both of which were eliminated in the reforms proposed by Turgot.

In their remonstrance against the edict suppressing the corvée (March 1776), the Parlement of Paris—afraid that a new tax would replace the corvée, and that this tax would apply to all, introducing equality as a principle—dared to remind the king:

The personal service of the clergy is to fulfill all the functions relating to education and religious observances and to contribute to the relief of the unfortunate through its alms. The noble dedicates his blood to the defense of the state and assists the sovereign with his counsel. The last class of the nation, which cannot render such distinguished service to the state, fulfills its obligation through taxes, industry, and physical labor.

The Second Estate (the nobility) consisted of approximately 1.5% of France's population, and was exempt from almost all taxes, including the Corvée Royale, which was a mandatory service through which roads were repaired and built by those subject to the corvée. In practice, anyone who paid a small fee could escape the corvée, so this burden of labor fell only to the poorest in France. The Second Estate was also exempt from the gabelle, which was the unpopular tax on salt, and also the taille, a land tax paid by peasants, and the oldest form of taxation in France.

The Second Estate feared they would have to pay the tax replacing the suppressed corvée. The nobles saw this tax as especially humiliating and below them, as they took great pride in their titles and their lineage, many of whom had died in defense of France. They saw this elimination of tax privilege as the gateway for more attacks on their rights and urged Louis XVI throughout the protests of the Parlement of Paris not to enact the proposed reforms.

These exemptions, as well as the right to wear a sword and their coat of arms, encouraged the idea of a natural superiority over the commoners that was common among members of the Second Estate, and as long as any noble was in possession of a fiefdom, they could collect a feudal dues from the Third Estate, which would allegedly be for the Third Estate's protection (this only applied to serfs and tenants of farmland owned by the nobility). Overall, the Second Estate had vast privileges that the Third Estate did not possess, which in effect protected the Second Estate's wealth and property, while hindering the Third Estate's ability to advance. The reforms proposed by Turgot and argued against in the protests of the Parlement of Paris conflicted with the Second Estate's interests to keep their hereditary privileges, and was the first step toward reform that seeped into the political arena. Turgot's reforms were unpopular among the commoners as well, who saw the parlements as their best defense against the power of the monarchy.
