= Freedom of commerce and industry =

Freedom of Commerce and Industry (Liberté du commerce et de l'industrie) is a French legal principle established during the French Revolution governing economic activities. It describes an economically liberal regulatory framework characterized by free market access and competition, while allowing for public authorities to intervene for regulatory purposes.

== Relationship with related concepts ==
While French legal terminology historically emphasized the term "freedom of commerce and industry", the Constitutional Council of France introduced the concept of "freedom to undertake" (liberté d'entreprendre) in 1982. Other liberal economies often employ broader terms, such as "economic freedom", as seen in Article 27 of the Swiss Constitution.

French jurists have debated distinctions between these terminologies. Some argue that "freedom to undertake" is a subset of the broader "freedom of commerce and industry", which includes competitive freedoms. Others contend that "freedom to undertake" encompasses various specialized freedoms, including professional freedoms.

== Legal foundations ==
The legal recognition of freedom of commerce and industry varies globally, from explicit constitutional provisions to inferred guarantees through broader freedoms.

=== In France ===
The principle originated during the Ancien Régime, with increasing criticism of the guilds and corporations that restricted economic activities. Anne Robert Jacques Turgot, as Controller-General of Finances, championed this principle in his preamble to the 1774 royal decree on grain trade, asserting that "the freer the trade, the more quickly and abundantly the people are supplied."

Two pivotal revolutionary texts formalized this principle:

- The Allarde Decree of March 2 and 17, 1791, abolished guilds and established freedom to engage in commerce and industry, contingent on paying a licensing tax.
- The Le Chapelier Law of June 14 and 17, 1791, further prohibited the re-establishment of professional associations or guilds.

While the Allarde Decree is frequently cited as foundational, subsequent case law expanded it into a general principle of law.

=== In other jurisdictions ===
Some states explicitly enshrine economic freedom:

- The Swiss Constitution guarantees "economic freedom", including the free choice and exercise of a profession.
- The Italian Constitution states that "private economic initiative is free."

Other jurisdictions infer economic freedom from broader rights, such as the Fourteenth Amendment to the United States Constitution, interpreted by the Supreme Court of the United States to include contractual freedoms.

== Modern applications ==
Freedom of commerce and industry implies:

- Open Market Access: Excludes monopolies and ensures market entry for public and private operators.
- Operational Autonomy: Protects entrepreneurs' decisions regarding hiring, advertising, and restructuring.

Restrictions are permissible if justified by public interest and proportionate, as noted in Swiss and French constitutional and administrative jurisprudence.
