= Parlement of Rouen =

Provincial court of the Kingdom of France

Coordinates: 49.4423°N 1.0926°E

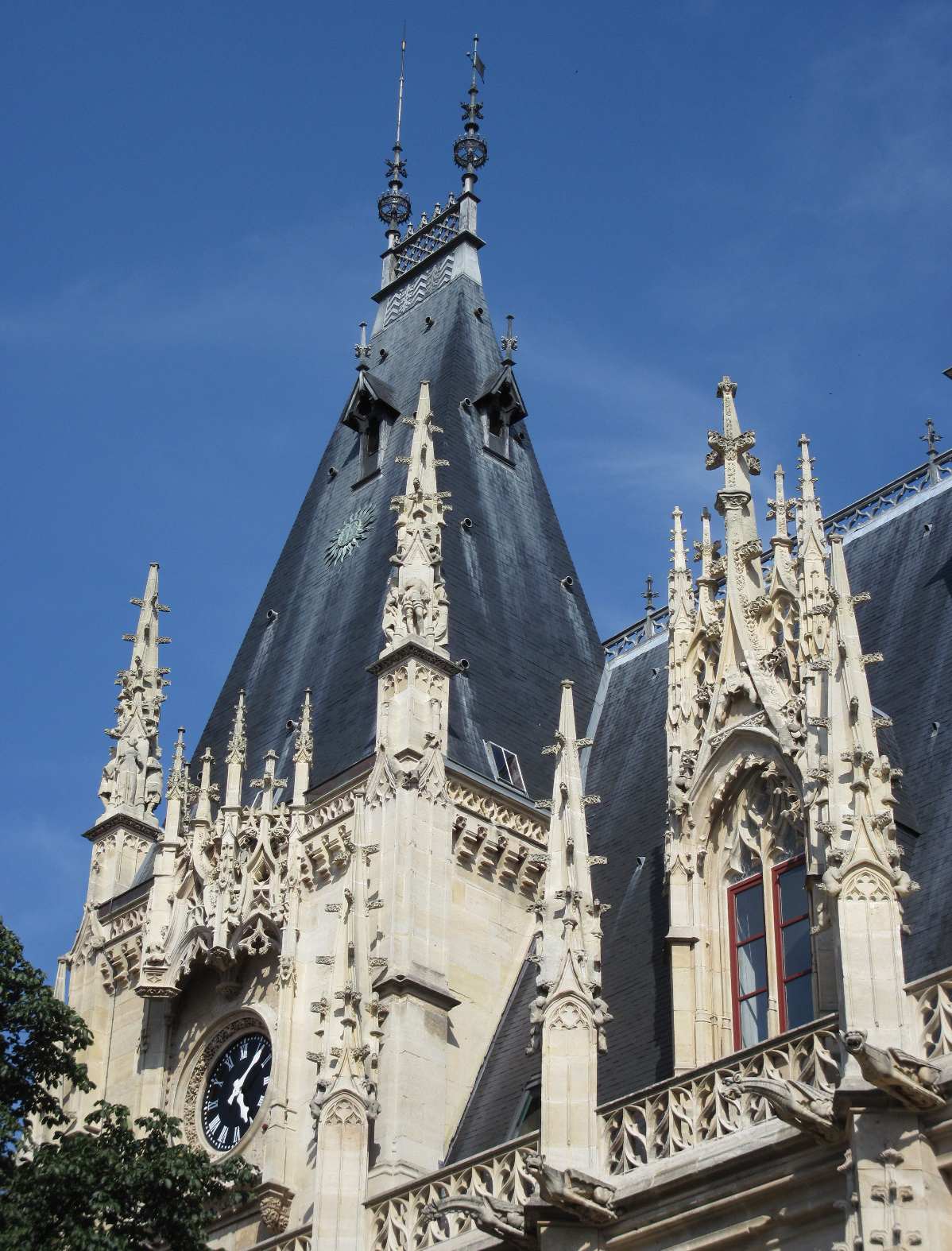
Frontage of the Parlement of Normandy in Rouen

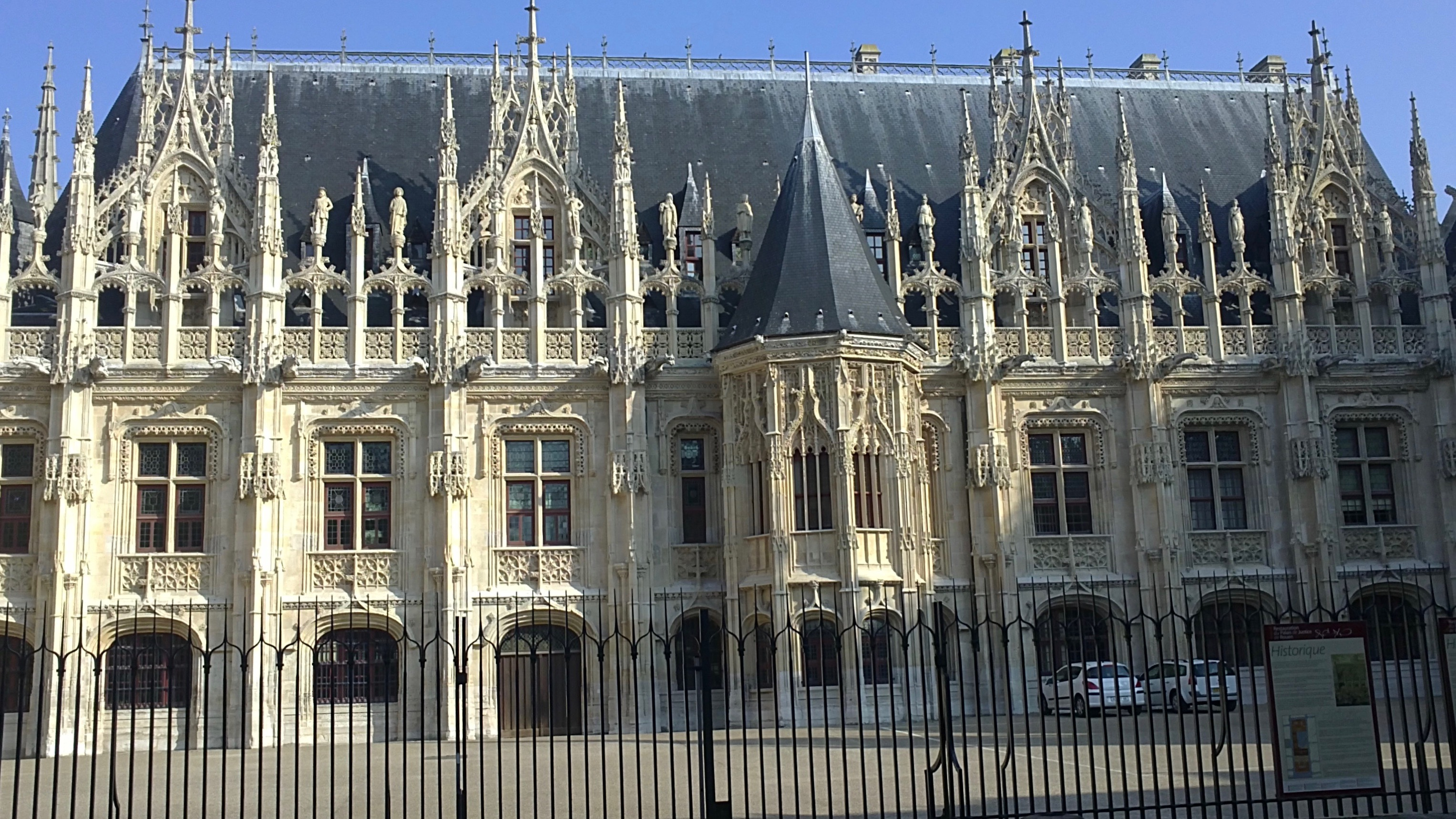
Main façade

The Parlement of Rouen (French: Parlement de Rouen), also known as the Parlement of Normandy (French: Parlement de Normandie) after the place where it sat (the provincial capital of Normandy), was a provincial parlement of the Kingdom of France. It replaced the ancient court of the exchequer of Normandy, set up by Rollo, first duke of Normandy.

The parlement was built in a mixing of the French Flamboyant style and Renaissance architecture by Roger Ango and Roulland le Roux, between 1499 and 1508, during the reign of the king Louis XII of France. Today, the building is the seat of the courthouse of the city of Rouen.

== History ==
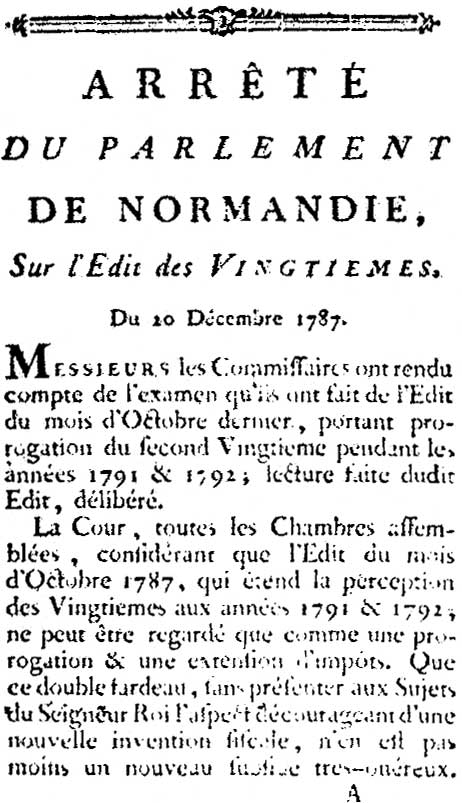
A decree of the parlement de Normandie from 1787.

Raised to a sovereign court and given a base in Rouen by Louis XII of France, this court's name was changed from échiquier to parlement by Francis I of France on his accession in 1515. The parlement de Rouen had responsibility for the seven great bailliages of Normandy – Rouen, Caudebec-en-Caux, Évreux, Les Andelys, Caen, Coutances and Alençon. It was thus made up of 4 presidents (of which the first and third were clergy and the other two laymen), 13 clergy councillors, 15 lay councillors, 2 greffiers (a secretary for civil law and one for criminal law), a huissier audiencier (the bailiff who officially assigns documents between lawyers and introduces the judges in the public court room), 6 other huissiers de justice, 2 advocates general and 1 procurator general. Following letters patent of 1507 from Louis XII, the archbishop of Rouen and the abbot of Saint-Ouen were 'ex officio' honorary councillors to the parlement.

When the court of the échiquier was made permanent, it was divided into two chambers, one to sit in the morning and the other in the afternoon. This second chamber later became known as the première des enquêtes. The chambre de la Tournelle, entrusted with criminal cases, was built in 1519 and the chambre des vacations was not set up until 1547. Until 1 October 1506, the parlement of Normandy sat in the château de Rouen then in the palais (which was begun in 1499 and only completed long afterwards).

Many kings of France held lits de justice at the parlement of Normandy. Charles VIII held one on 27 April 1485 and at it confirmed Normandy's privileges. Louis XII was accompanied there by the main officers of his court on 24 October 1508. On 2 August 1517, Francis I held one there, accompanied by chancellor Duprat and many officers of his court. Some days later, the dauphin came to the parliament, where he was granted the same honors as the king himself, as the king had ordered. In January 1518, he granted the parlement of Normandy the same privileges as that of the parlement de Paris and, by another edict the following February, temporarily exempted it from the arrière-ban.

On 8 October 1550, Henri II held a lit de justice at the parlement de Rouen, accompanied by the cardinals, king Henry II of Navarre, many dukes, constable Anne de Montmorency, the admiral, the duc de Longueville, chancellor Olivier, and many other lords. Charles IX was declared of age at the parlement, accompanied by chancellor Michel de L'Hospital.

In 1523, Francis I exempted the parlement from the gabelle and ordained that it would issue to each of his officers and his widow as much salt as it had for his household, without fixing the quantity, paying only the market price, on the condition it did not abuse this privilege. In 1540 chancellor Guillaume Poyet set the king against the parlement de Rouen, and the king banned it. Commissaires were named for the Tournelle, and a president and 12 councillors sent to Bayeux, to give justice to the subjects of basse-Normandie until the king raised his ban; and wishing to give to this court's officers a mark of his satisfaction with their conduct, in June 1542 he made the arrière-ban exemption general and perpetual via an edict.

In 1560, the parlement of Normandy and the other provincial parlements were suppressed before being reestablished in June 1568 by Charles IX. In February 1589, an edict of the month by Henry IV of France transferred the parlement to Caen after Rouen rose against the king, before it was reestablished in Rouen by another edict of 8 April 1594. Banned again in 1639, for not having opposed the revolt of the va-nu-pieds strongly enough, it as replaced by commissaires from the parlement de Paris until its reestablishment in January 1641.

In April 1545, Francis I had set up a criminal chamber here to judge cases relating to Protestants, which was replaced by a chambre de l’édit, as part of the execution of the edict of Nantes of April 1598, suppressed in its turn in January 1685 as part of the edict of Fontainebleau. Made up at this time of 57 councillors and 2 presidents, an edict of July 1680 created a second chambre des enquêtes, after which the parlement was made up of five chambers, the grand-chambre, the Tournelle, two chambres des enquêtes and the chambre des requêtes du palais right up until the French Revolution. It was at the parlement of Normandy that, from 1728, the general assemblies of députés of different courts and other notables met to discuss public affairs such as hospitals' needs and other necessities.

== Organisation ==
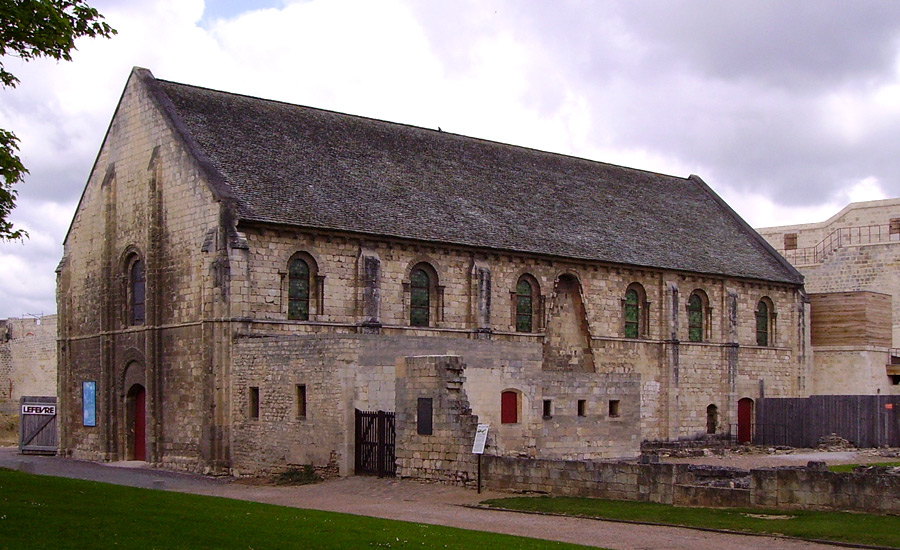
The salle de l’Échiquier in the château de Caen.

== Sources ==
- Encyclopédie ou Dictionnaire raisonné des sciences, des arts et des métiers by Diderot & d’Alembert, vol. 12, p. 60
