= Alfred Franklin (historian) =

French librarian, historian, and writer (1830–1917)

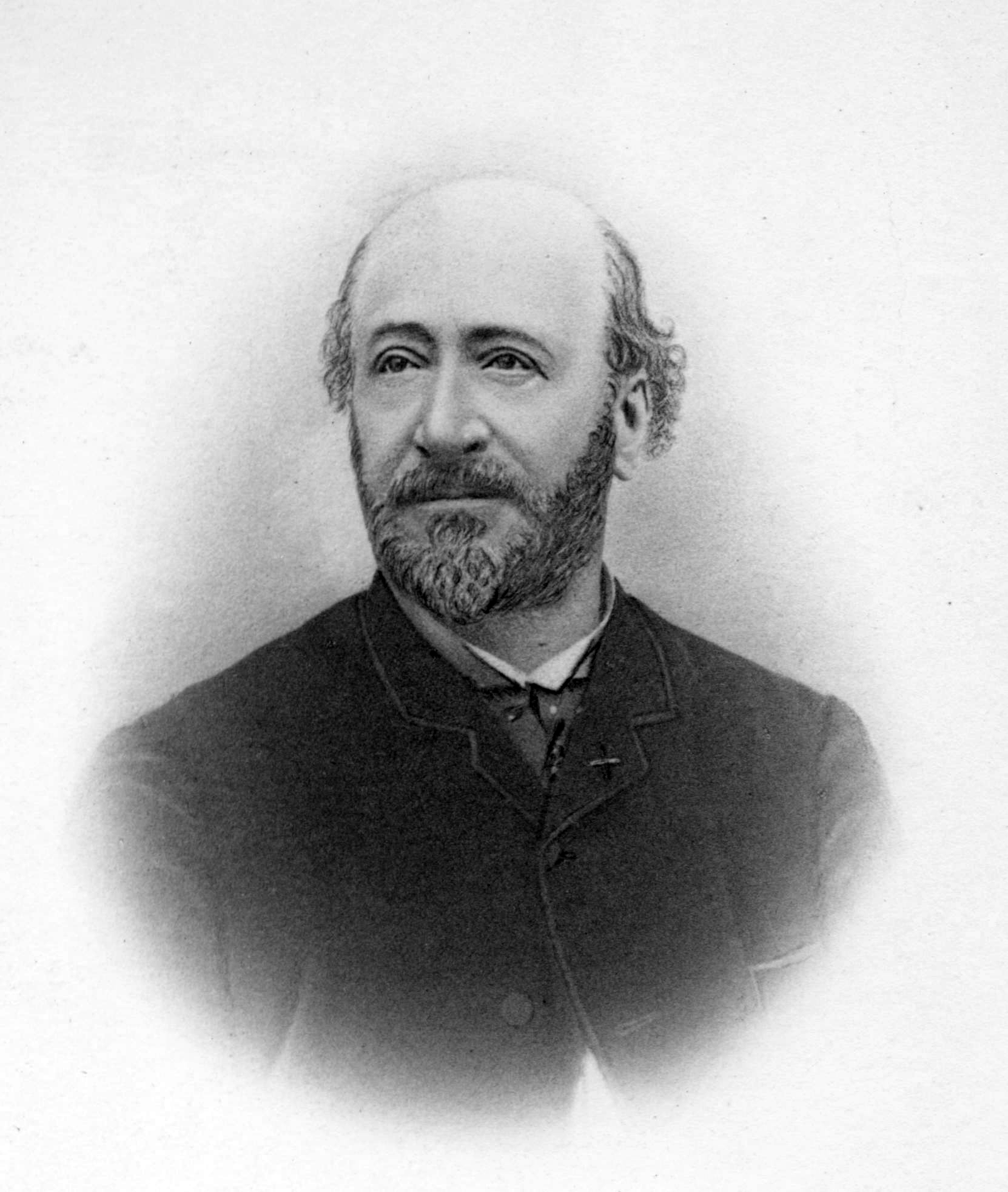
- Born: Alfred Louis Auguste Poux; 16 December 1830; Versailles, Yvelines
- Died: 10 July 1917 (aged 86); Viroflay
- Occupations: Librarian, historian, bibliographer, and author
- Writing career
- Pen name: Alfred Franklin; Alfred Mantien
- Notable works: La Vie privée d'autrefois (1887–1900)

Alfred Louis Auguste Poux, better known by his pen name Alfred Franklin, (1830–1917) was a French librarian, historian, and writer.

== Biography ==
After education at the collège Bourbon in Paris, Franklin began his literary career by writing feuilletons and theatrical reviews for the popular press. In 1856 he published a political pamphlet L'Intervention à Naples : le règne de Ferdinand II, related to the political turmoil during the reign of Ferdinand II.

In 1856 Franklin gained employment in a supernumerary position at the Bibliothèque Mazarine and was promoted there to librarian, to assistant director in 1879, and to director in 1885 upon the death of Frédéric Baudry, who had been the director from 1874 to 1885. Franklin held the directorship until his retirement in 1906. He contributed articles to many journals, including Bulletin du bouquiniste, Bulletin du bibliophile, Bibliophile illustré, Nouvelle biographie générale, Paris à travers les âges, and L’Intermédiaire des chercheurs et curieux.

As a bibliographer and historian, he wrote many works, specializing in the history of Paris. Notably, from 1887 to 1902 he published Vie privée d'autrefois in 27 small volumes and Histoire des bibliothèques parisiennes in 3 volumes. In 1875 Alfred Franklin published two works of fiction: an historical novel Ameline du Bourg and an alternate history novella Les Ruines de Paris en 4875. He also published Mœurs et coutumes des Parisiens en 1882 under the pen name Alfred Mantien.

Alfred Franklin, a nephew of Pastor Montaudon, was, from 1865 to 1903, the treasurer of the Société d'histoire du protestantisme français. On 9 February 1876 he was awarded the Légion d’honneur for his work on the history of Paris. His last book was published in 1914. He was survived by his widow.

== Selected publications ==
- L’Intervention à Naples : le règne de Ferdinand II, Paris, A. Taride, 1856.
- Histoire de la Bibliothèque Mazarine : depuis sa fondation jusqu'à nos jours, Paris, A. Aubry, 1860 (une seconde édition, revue et augmentée a été publiée en 1901 chez Welter).
- La Bibliothèque impériale : son organisation, son catalogue, Paris, A. Aubry, 1861.
- Les Origines du Palais de l'Institut. Recherches historiques sur le collège des Quatre-Nations, d'après des documents entièrement inédits, Paris, A. Aubry, 1862.
- Recherches sur la bibliothèque publique de l'église Notre-Dame de Paris, au XIII^{e} siècle, d'après les documents inédits, Paris, A. Aubry, 1863.
- Recherches sur la bibliothèque de la Faculté de médecine de Paris; Notice sur les manuscrits qui y sont conservés : d'après des documents entièrement inédits, Paris, A. Aubry, 1864.
- Vie de J. Calvin, par Théodore de Bèze. Nouvelle édition, publiée et annotée par Alfred Franklin, Paris, J. Cherbuliez, 1864.
- Histoire de la bibliothèque de l'abbaye de Saint-Victor à Paris d'après des documents inédits, Paris, A. Aubry, 1865.
- Les anciennes bibliothèques de Paris : églises, monastères, collèges, Paris, Imprimerie impériale, 1867-1873. 3 vol.
- Préface du catalogue de la Bibliothèque Mazarine, rédigée en 1751 par le bibliothécaire P. Desmarais. publiée, traduite en français et annotée par Alfred Franklin, Paris, J. Miard, 1867.
- Étude historique et topographique sur le plan de Paris, de 1540, dit plan de tapisserie, Paris, A. Aubry, 1869.
- Mémoire confidentiel adressé à Mazarin, par Gabriel Naudé, après la mort de Richelieu; publié, d'après le manuscrit autographe et inédit, par Alfred Franklin., Paris, L. Willem, 1870.
- Estat, noms et nombre de toutes les rues de Paris en 1636 : d'après le manuscrit inédit de la Bibliothèque nationale. Précédés d'une Étude sur la voirie et l'hygiène publique à Paris depuis le XII^{e} siècle, Paris, L. Willem, 1873.
- Les Rues et les cris de Paris au XIII^{e} siècle. Pièces historiques. précédées d'une Étude sur les rues de Paris au XIII^{e} siècle, Paris, L. Willem, 1874 (Collection de documents rares ou inédits relatifs à l'histoire de Paris).
- Ordonnance, faicte pour les funérailles célébrées à Paris, le 24 avril 1498, pour l'enterrement du corps du bon roy Charles huytiesme. publié par Alfred Franklin, Paris, Lechasser, 1874.
- Dictionnaire des noms, surnoms et pseudonymes latins de l'histoire littéraire du Moyen Âge (1100 à 1530), Paris, Firmin-Didot, 1875.
- La Sorbonne : ses origines, sa bibliothèque, les débuts de l'imprimerie à Paris et la succession de Richelieu d'après des documents inédits, 2^{e} éd. augm., Paris, L. Willem, 1875.
- Les ruines de Paris en 4875 : documents officiels et inédits recueillis et publiés par Alfred Franklin, Paris, L. Willem, 1875 (les réédition successives portent chacune un titre un peu différent, en fonction de la date de publication : Les ruines de Paris en 4908. en 1908, etc.).
- Ameline Du Bourg, Paris, Sandoz et Fischbacher, 1875.
- Journal du siège de Paris en 1590 : rédigé par un des assiégés, publié, d'après le ms de la Bibliothèque Mazarine, par Alfred Franklin, Paris, L. Willem, 1876.
- Notice sur le plan de Paris de Pigafetta, Paris, impr. de Daupeley-Gouverneur, 1876.
- Les Sources de l'histoire de France, notices bibliographiques et analytiques des inventaires et des recueils de documents relatifs à l'histoire de France, Paris, Firmin-Didot, 1877.
- Les anciens plans de Paris : notices historiques et topographiques, Paris, L. Willem, 1878-1880.
- Mœurs et coutumes des Parisiens en 1882 : cours professé au Collège de France pendant le second semestre de l'année 1882 par Alfred Mantien, Paris, C. Agnoste, 1882.
- Les Corporations ouvrières de Paris, du XII^{e} au XVIII^{e} siècle, histoire, statuts, armoiries, d'après des documents originaux ou inédits, Paris, Firmin-Didot, 1884.
- Les Grandes Scènes historiques du XVI^{e} siècle : reproduction en fac-similé du recueil de J. Tortorel et J. Perrissin publié sous la direction de M. Alfred Franklin, Paris, Fischbacher, 1886.
- La Vie privée d'autrefois : arts et métiers, modes, mœurs, usages des Parisiens, du XII^{e} au XVIII^{e} siècle d'après des documents originaux ou inédits, Paris, E. Plon, Nourrit, 1887-1902 (I. L'annonce et la réclame, les cris de Paris, Antoine Truquet. 1887; II. Les soins de toilette, le savoir-vivre. 1887; III. La cuisine. 1888; IV. La mesure du temps. 1888; V. Comment on devenait patron. 1889; VI. Les repas. 1889; VII. L'hygiène. 1890; VIII. Variétés gastronomiques. 1891; IX. Les médicaments. 1891; X. Écoles et collèges. 1891; XI. Les médecins. 1892; XII. Les chirurgiens. 1893; XIII. Le café, le thé et le chocolat. 1893; XIV. Variétés chirurgicales. 1894; XV-XVI. Les magasins de nouveautés. I. 1894; XVI. Les magasins de nouveautés. II. 1895; XVII. L'enfant, la naissance, le baptême. 1895; XVIII. Les magasins de nouveautés. III. 1896; XIX. L'enfant, la layette, la nourrice, la vie de famille, les jouets et les jeux. 1896; XX. Les animaux. I. 1897; XXI. La vie de Paris sous la Régence. 1897; XXII. Les Magasins de nouveautés. IV. 1898; XXIII. La Vie de Paris sous Louis XIV, tenue de maison et domesticité. 1898; XXIV. Les Animaux. II. 1899; XXV. Variétés parisiennes. 1901; XXVI. La Vie de Paris sous Louis XV. Devant les tribunaux. Causes amusantes et connues, Estienne Robert. 1899; XXVII. La Vie de Paris sous Louis XVI, début du règne. 1902) .
- Histoire généalogique des souverains de la France : ses gouvernements de Hugues Capet à l'année 1896, Paris, C. Delagrave, 1896 (une seconde édition mise à jour a été publiée en 1906 chez Welter sous le titre Des Noms et des dates. Les rois et les gouvernements de la France, de Hugues Capet à l'année 1906).
- Dictionnaire historique des arts, métiers et professions exercés dans Paris depuis le treizième siècle, Paris, H. Welter, 1906. available at Gallica
- Guide des savants, des littérateurs et des artistes dans les bibliothèques de Paris par un vieux bibliothécaire, Paris, H. Welter, 1908.
- La Civilité, l'étiquette, la mode, le bon ton, du XIII^{e} au XIX^{e} siècle, Paris, Émile-Paul, 1908.
- Le Duel de Jarnac et de La Châtaigneraie d'après une relation contemporaine et officielle, Paris, Émile-Paul, 1909.
- Christine de Suède et l'assassinat de Monaldeschi au château de Fontainebleau, d'après trois relations contemporaines, Paris, Émile-Paul, 1912.
- La Cour de France et l'assassinat du maréchal d'Ancre, Paris, Émile-Paul, 1913.
