= Professional tax (France) =

Local French tax applied 1975 - 2010

The Professional tax (French: Taxe professionnelle or TP) was prior to 2010 a tax levied on businesses (professionals and corporations) whose proceeds financed territorial collectivities. It was created by the Law 75-678 voted on 29 July 1975 that repealed the centuries-old patente and replaced it with the professional tax.

== History ==
=== Creation ===
Up until the mid-1970s, the local tax system consisted of 4 outdated taxes whose creation dated back to 1791 amidst the French Revolution. Under the premierships of Pierre Messmer and Jacques Chirac, all of them would be substantially reformed:

- The contribution foncière was replaced by the land value tax (taxe foncière) in 1974;
- The contribution mobilière was replaced with rates tax (taxe d'habitation) the same year;
- Lastly the patente was replaced by the professional tax in 1976.

Starting in 1978, tax rates for these three taxes are set freely on an annual basis by each general council, municipal council and other local bodies (Note: Namely: inter-municipal associations (syndicats intercommunaux); districts; urban communities (communautés urbaines)) entitled to collect the taxes.

=== Subsequent reform ===
Up until the fiscal year 2002, the tax base for the professional tax consisted of:

- The assessed rental value of buildings (all taxpayers);
- The assessed rental value of other properties, plants and equipment (for corporations only); (Note: Assessed as 16% of the purchase price or 100% of the lease payment if under lease agreement)
- 10% of the revenues (for professionals only); (Note: Reduced by 1% each year between 2003 and 2005. The rate was 6% when the tax was abolished on 31 December 2009)
- 18% of the salaries paid by the corporation (all taxpayers).
  - Salaries paid to apprentices or person with disabilities were completely excluded.

==== Tax capped at 5% of added value (1985) ====
In 1985 the professional tax was capped at 5% of the added value of the taxpayer recorded in the second year prior to the fiscal year where the tax is assessed (i.e. 1983 for fiscal year 1985).

==== Salaries removed from the tax base (2000–2002) ====
The later was progressively repealed between 2000 and 2002 as it was considered harmful for employment. Salaries were completely excluded from the tax base starting 1 January 2003.

==== Tax capped at 1.5% of added value (2004) ====
President Jacques Chirac announced on 6 January 2004 the imminent abolition of the professional tax. The tax was however not repealed at this time and instead was capped at 1.5% of the value added and investments made after 1 January 2004 are excluded from the tax base. The French state provided territorial collectivities with additional transfer payments to compensate for the resulting loss in revenues.

==== Exclusion of new investments from the tax base (2008–2010) ====
On 23 October 2008 President Nicolas Sarkozy announced that any investment made prior to 1 January 2010 would be 100% excluded from the professional tax base.

=== Replacement by the CFE and CVAE taxes ===
A few months later, in a televised interview, Nicolas Sarkozy announced that the professional tax would be abolished in 2010. The president costed that measure at €8 billion per year. The Finance Law for 2010 repealed the professional tax and instead replaced it with two new taxes:

- The Company Real Estate Contribution (Cotisation foncière des entreprises or CFE);
- The Contribution on the added value of companies (Cotisation sur la valeur ajoutée des entreprises or CVAE).

The French State promised that territorial collectivities would be fully compensated for any loss in revenues arising for the replacement of the professional tax by the CFE and CVAE.

== See also ==
- Taxation in France
- Corporation tax in France
