= Ollivier law =

The Ollivier Law (Loi Ollivier) was a French law, passed on 25 May 1864, which legalized striking after it had been banned since 1791 and the Le Chapelier Law. However, it remained limited and still maintained the concept of "impeding the free exercise of workers' rights" ("délit d'entrave à la liberté du travail").

Despite legalizing strikes, the law did not legalize trade unions, which remained illegal in France until the 1884 Waldeck-Rousseau Law, but under certain conditions, strikes became possible. The Ollivier Law, like the financing of a workers' delegation to the 1862 Universal Exhibition in London, demonstrated Napoleon III's desire to create a link between the regime and the workers. The law was fiercely opposed by the right, and many Moderate Republicans did not accept it.

A major milestone in the development of trade unionism, it was nevertheless supplanted in 1884 by the Waldeck-Rousseau Law.

The Popular Front reaffirmed the right to organize in 1936, and, in 1946, the right to strike was enshrined in the preamble to the French constitution.
