= Lit de justice =

Royal legislative procedure in the Kingdom of France

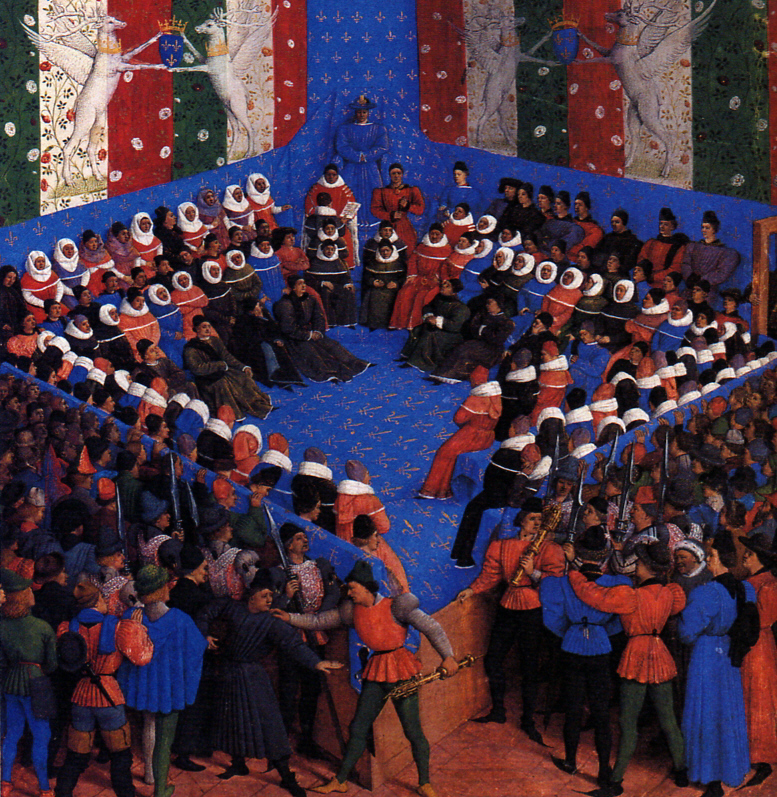
Lit de justice of king Charles VII at the Vendôme, in 1458, by Jean Fouquet

In France under the Ancien Régime, the lit de justice (French pronunciation: [li də ʒystis], "bed of justice") was a particular formal session of the Parlement of Paris, under the presidency of the King of France, for the compulsory registration of the royal edicts and to impose his sovereignty. It was named thus because the king would sit on a throne of cushions under a baldachin. In the Middle Ages, not every appearance of the King of France in parlement occasioned a formal lit de justice.

== Description ==
A lit de justice in Paris was normally held in the Grand'Chambre du Parlement of the royal palace on the Île de la Cité, which remains the Palais de Justice even today. The king, fresh from his devotions in Sainte-Chapelle, would enter, accompanied by his chancellor, the princes du sang, dukes and peers, cardinals and marshals, and take his place upon the cushions on a dais under a canopy of estate (the lit) in a corner of the chamber.

The records of a lit de justice of Charles V, May 21, 1375, gives an impression of the panoply of personages: the Dauphin, the duc d'Anjou brother of the king, the Patriarch of Alexandria, 4 archbishops, 7 bishops, 6 abbots, the rector and several members of the University of Paris, the Chancellor of France, 4 princes of the blood, several comtes and seigneurs, the Provost of Merchants and the echevins of the city of Paris, "several other wise and notable folk and a great crowd of people".

Five cushions formed the lit: the king sat on one, another formed a back, two more supported his arms and a cushion lay under his feet. Peers and prelates were ranged on benches at his right and left. Before the king, a large space was kept empty, that the king might discuss matters privately. To preserve order, it was forbidden for anyone to leave his seat or approach the lit without being called.

The king needed only speak a few preliminary words, followed by the formula mon chancelier vous dira le reste ("my chancellor will tell you the rest"), whereupon the chancellor seated at his feet would read aloud the rest of the royal declaration, such as the declaration of a regency or of a king's majority, or declarations of war or peace. The lit de justice equally served to cow recalcitrant parlements, imposing the sovereignty of the king.

== Later practice ==
In the Middle Ages, a lit de justice was the setting for trials of great aristocrats for major crimes. From the 16th century onwards, it was used to enforce the registration of royal edicts. In the 17th century, it was a rare event but it was revived under Louis XV, raising controversy among the parliamentary noblesse de robe, mindful of their threatened prerogatives.

The lit de justice, as it was revived in 1527, was intended by the royal party as an expression of royal justice, with hazy and immemorial antecedents in the open-air gathering of nobles presided over by enthroned Merovingian kings. In the king's presence the parlements lost its usual quality of judge, to take the role of counsellor following the principle adveniente principe, cessat magistratus ("with the arrival of the king, magistratures cease"). As relations between Henry III and the Parlement of Paris became strained, the king used his presence in the lit de justice to enforce his will upon a recalcitrant court.

Absolutist propaganda asserted that a lit de justice in its origins could take place before any parlement. In practice, however, the ceremony was almost always held at the Parlement of Paris, and appearances before other parlements—beginning with that of Charles IX before the Parliament of Rouen to enforce the registration of his Edict of Amboise (1563)—were a Renaissance-era innovation intended to discount the legislative role of the Parlement of Paris. He and the Queen Mother Catherine de' Medici made a tour of parlements—Dijon, Bordeaux, Toulouse—to enforce the registration of the Edict throughout France. From the reign of Louis XIII it was confined to the Parlement of Paris.

In his Memoirs, the Duc de Saint-Simon describes in detail a lit de justice held during the Regency of the Duke of Orléans on September 2, 1715. The lit was used to enact an edict overruling the testament of the deceased Louis XIV, stripping the Duke of Maine of his control over the child King Louis XV's education and of the rank of prince du sang.

The last such session was on May 8, 1788, under Louis XVI, at Versailles.
