= Le Chapelier Law =

Legislation banning guilds in France

The Le Chapelier Law (French: Loi Le Chapelier) was a piece of legislation passed by the National Assembly during the first phase of the French Revolution (14 June 1791), banning French guilds as the early version of trade unions, as well as compagnonnage (by organizations such as the Compagnons du Tour de France) and the right to strike, and proclaiming free enterprise as the norm. It was advocated and drafted by Isaac René Guy le Chapelier. Its promulgation enraged the sans-culottes, who called for an end to the National Constituent Assembly, which nonetheless continued through the second phase of the Revolution. The law was annulled on 25 May 1864, through the Ollivier law (proposed by Émile Ollivier and acceded to by Napoleon III), which reinstated the right to associate and the right to strike.

== See also ==
- Combination Act 1799 sought to do the same in England.
