= Temple Neuf =

Temple Neuf may refer to:

- Temple Neuf, Metz
- Temple Neuf, Strasbourg
