= Place Saint-Jacques, Metz =

Square in Metz, France

Coordinates: 49.1185°N 6.1760°E

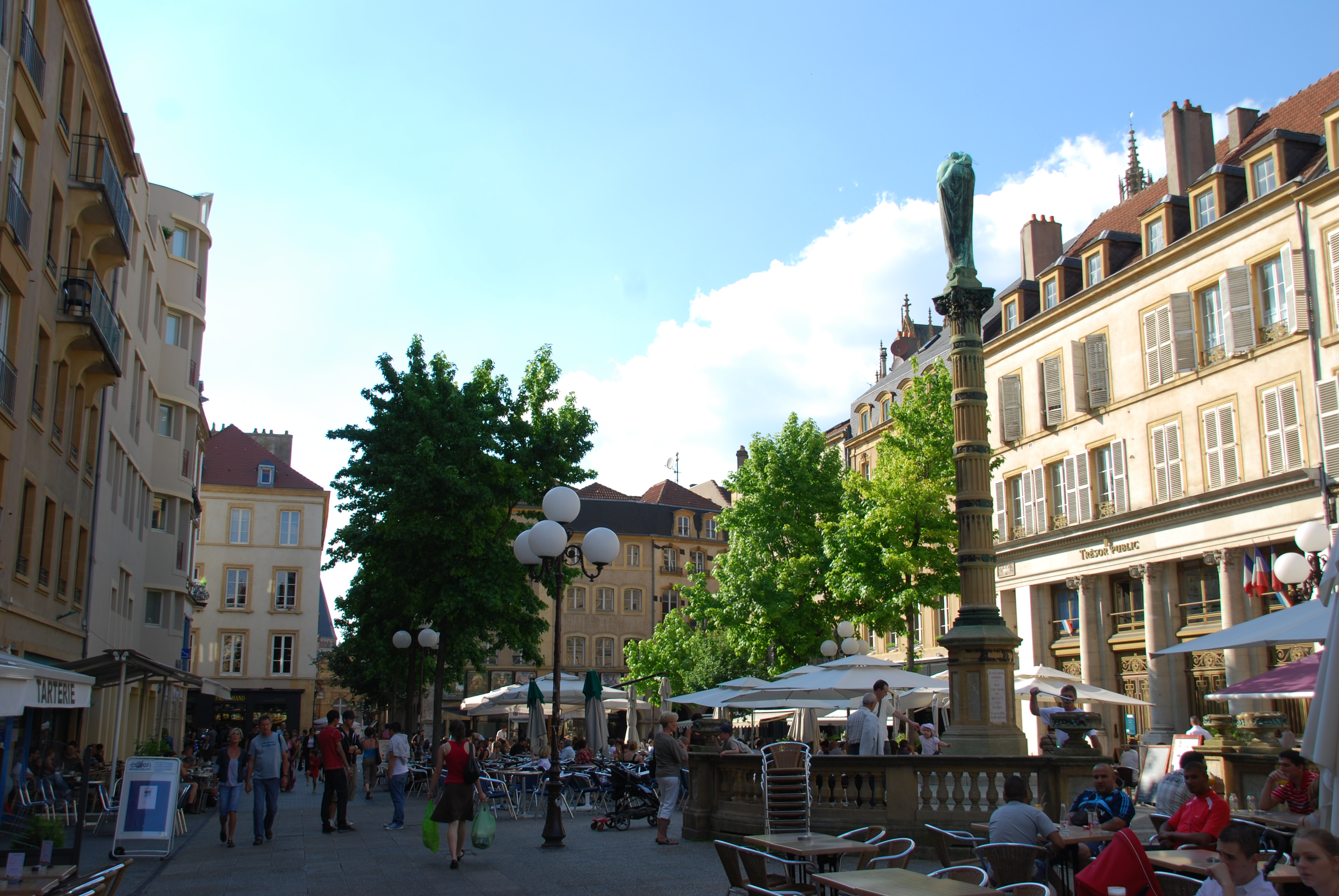
The Place Saint-Jacques in Metz

The Place Saint-Jacques (French pronunciation: [plas sɛ̃ ʒak], "St. James's Square") is situated in the centre of Metz, France, in front of the centre Saint-Jacques, a three-storey mall. It is located between the Rue Fabert and the Rue Ladoucette, in the heart of the historic and pedestrian centre, near the cathedral.

== Names ==
The current name of the square appeared in the 12th century and derives from the Église Saint-Jacques (Church of St. James) which was on the square before being demolished in 1574. The name of the square has changed several times over the course of history. Most recently, the name changed due to events surrounding the Franco-Prussian War, World War I, and World War II.

- Place Saint-Jacques (1137 - 1609 - 1698)
- Place Derrière-Saint-Sauveur (1698 - 1773)
- Place de la République (1792)
- Place d’Austerlitz (1806 - 1815)
- Place Saint-Jacques (1816 - 1830)
- Place d’Austerlitz (1831 - 1874)
- Jakobplatz, in the Imperial territory of Alsace-Lorraine (1874 - 1918)
- Place Saint-Jacques (1918 - 1940)
- Jakobplatz, in CdZ-Gebiet Lothringen (1940 - 1944)
- Place Saint-Jacques (1944 – present)

== History ==
The Place Saint-Jacques is situated near the main crossroads of the Roman city (Rue Taison and En Fournirue) and its location almost corresponds with the placement of the Roman Forum.

A fountain was built in the Place Saint-Jacques in 1498 but it was torn down in 1730; it was rebuilt in 1759 between the Rue Ladoucette and the Rue du Petit Paris. It was again destroyed in the French Revolution and later relocated to rue du Pont-des-Morts.

Beginning in 1832, a covered vegetable and flower market filled the square. Market contracts began and ended on December 26 of each year; on that day, people seeking employment gathered there. The building was demolished in 1907 due to unsanitary conditions.

Today, the square is known by Messins for its numerous coffeehouses and restaurants with outside tables for when the weather is fine.

=== Notre Dame de Metz (Our Lady of Metz) ===
During the German retreat at the end of World War I in 1918, Catholics in Metz feared that the city might become a second Verdun, so they asked Reverend Willibrord Benzler, Bishop of Metz from 1901 to 1919, to pledge to erect a statue to the Blessed Virgin so that the city would be spared from armed combat. The prelate accepted. However, he was expelled by the French authorities in July 1919 and died in Germany in 1921. The statue was inaugurated on the Feast of the Assumption in 1924. The Place Saint-Jacques was chosen as the location for its centrality and its proximity to the cathedral. The sanctification was celebrated by Reverend Jean-Baptiste Pelt, the new Bishop of Metz, in the presence of Reverend Charles Ruch, Bishop of Strasbourg, and Reverend Alphonse-Gabriel Foucault, Bishop of Saint-Die, after an address by Reverend du Bois Jagu de la Villerabel, Archbishop of Rouen and Primate of Normandy. The bronze statue by Jacques Martin is 1.90 metres (6.2 ft) tall and stands on an Ionic column of fine stone of Jaumont 8 metres (26 ft) high, by Max Braemer.

Again on 15 August 1940, in spite of the assembly ban imposed by the Nazis then occupying the city and the presence of many armed soldiers, nothing could prevent the citizens of Metz from showing their devotion to Our Lady of Metz and demonstrating their patriotic attachment to France. They gathered silently on the jam-packed square. The statue was surrounded by flowers in the three colors of France and a huge Cross of Lorraine embellished with thistles and a ribbon in yellow and red, the colours of Lorraine, was attached to the column on which the motto of Lorraine could be read: Qui s'y frotte s'y pique (who rubs himself on it pricks himself on it), a reference to the cotton thistle, the symbol of Lorraine. Suddenly in the silent crowd a chant began: Reine de France – Priez pour nous – Notre espérance – Venez et sauvez-nous (Queen of France - Pray for us - Our hope - Come and save us), and was taken up immediately by all the faithful present. The chant was started by Sister Helen Studler, a Daughter of Charity, who had the courage to express her desire to see the tricolor flag of France waving again in Metz. The crowd then returned to the cathedral in silence and many spent the whole night in prayer.

The tradition is honoured each year on August 15, the day of the Assumption of the Virgin Mary. First of all, the Pontifical Mass is celebrated in the morning at the Cathedral of Saint Étienne. Then, after vespers is sung, the bishop conducts a procession from the cathedral to the historic column in the middle of the Place Saint-Jacques.

== Sources ==
- Michel Thiria, "La place Saint-Jacques", L'Austrasie, 1909 (in French)
- "La statue de Notre-Dame sur la place Saint-Jacques", La Voix lorraine 33, 15 August 1971, p. 6 (in French)
