= Metz =

City in Grand Est, France

- Prefecture and commune
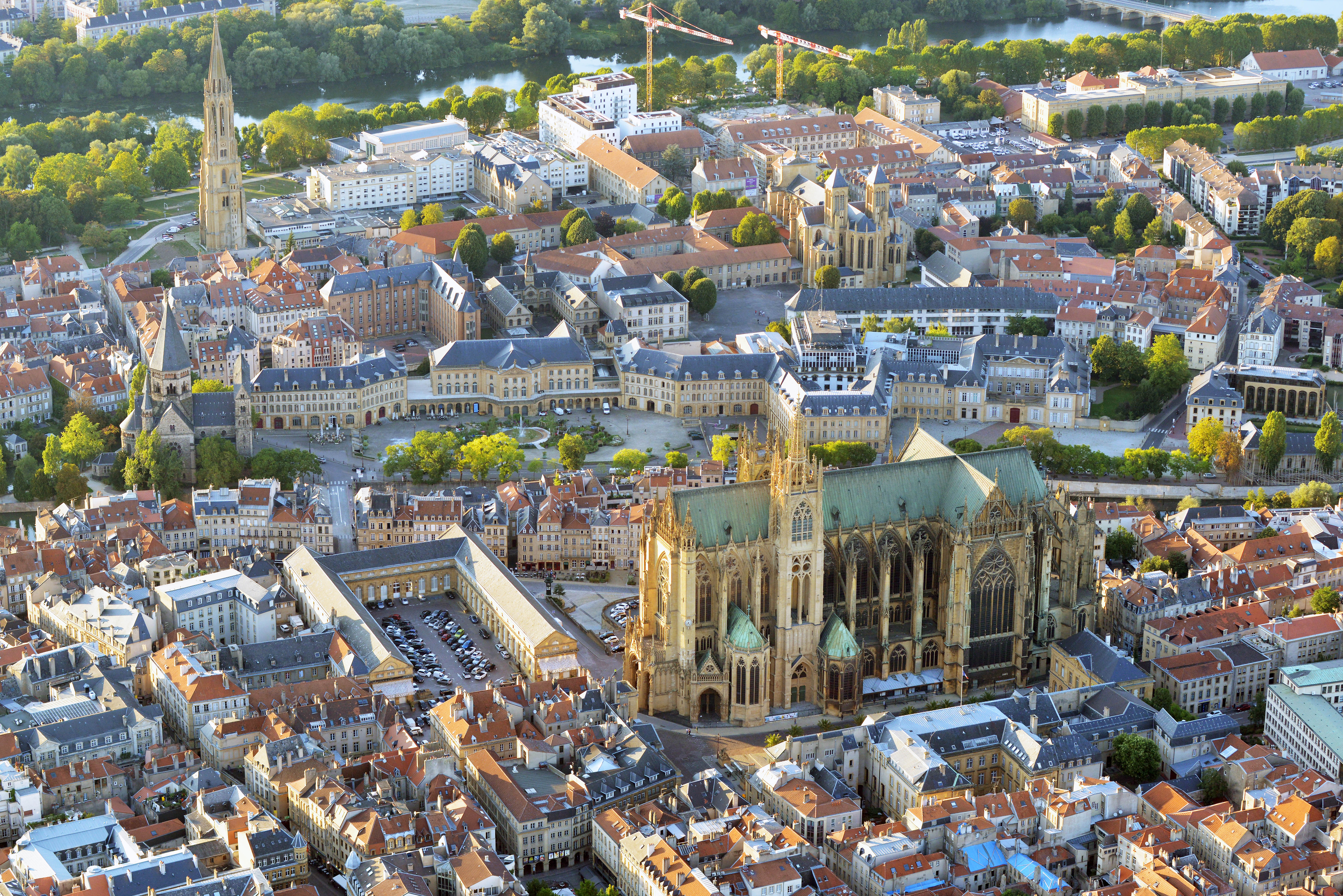
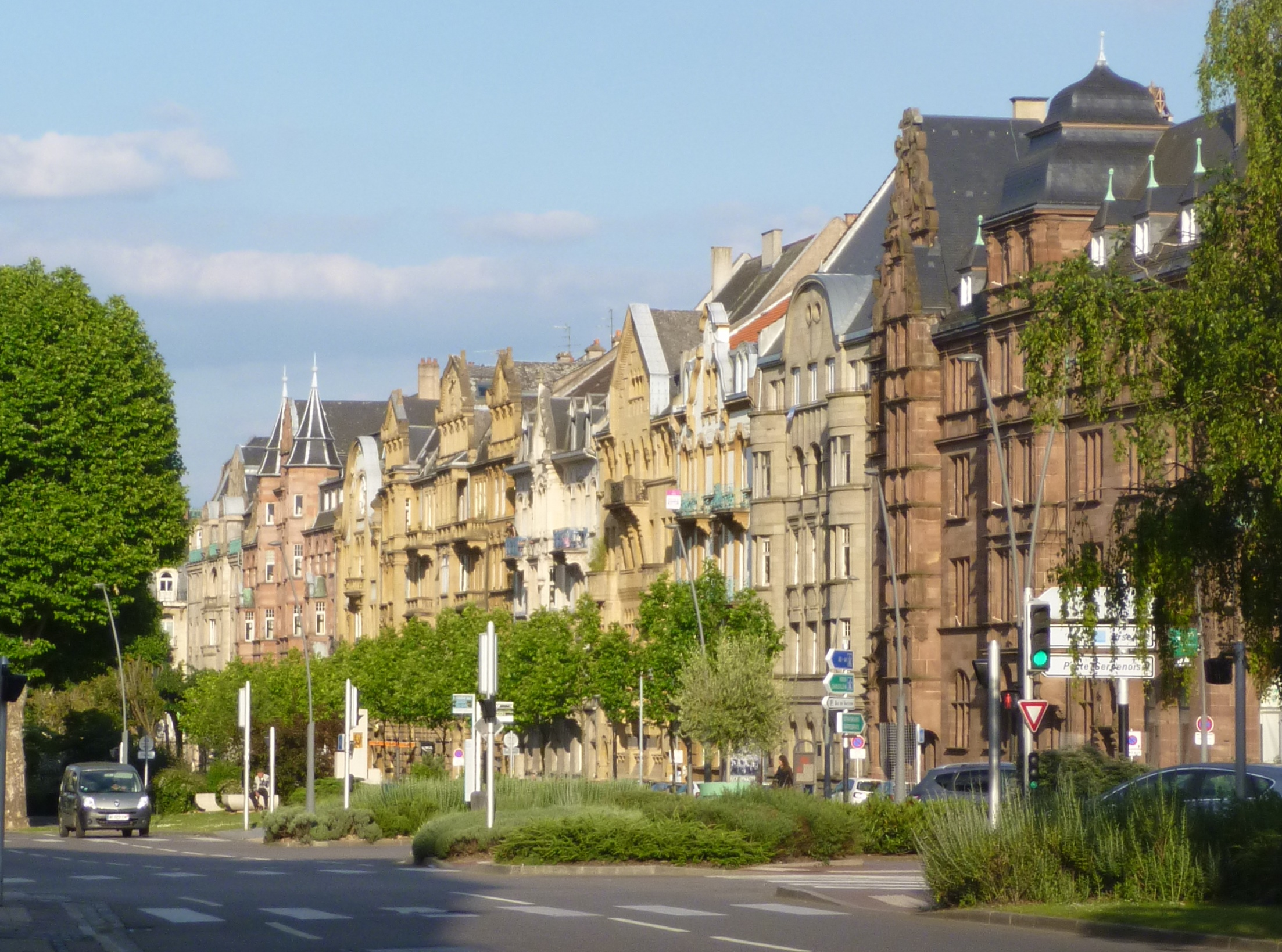
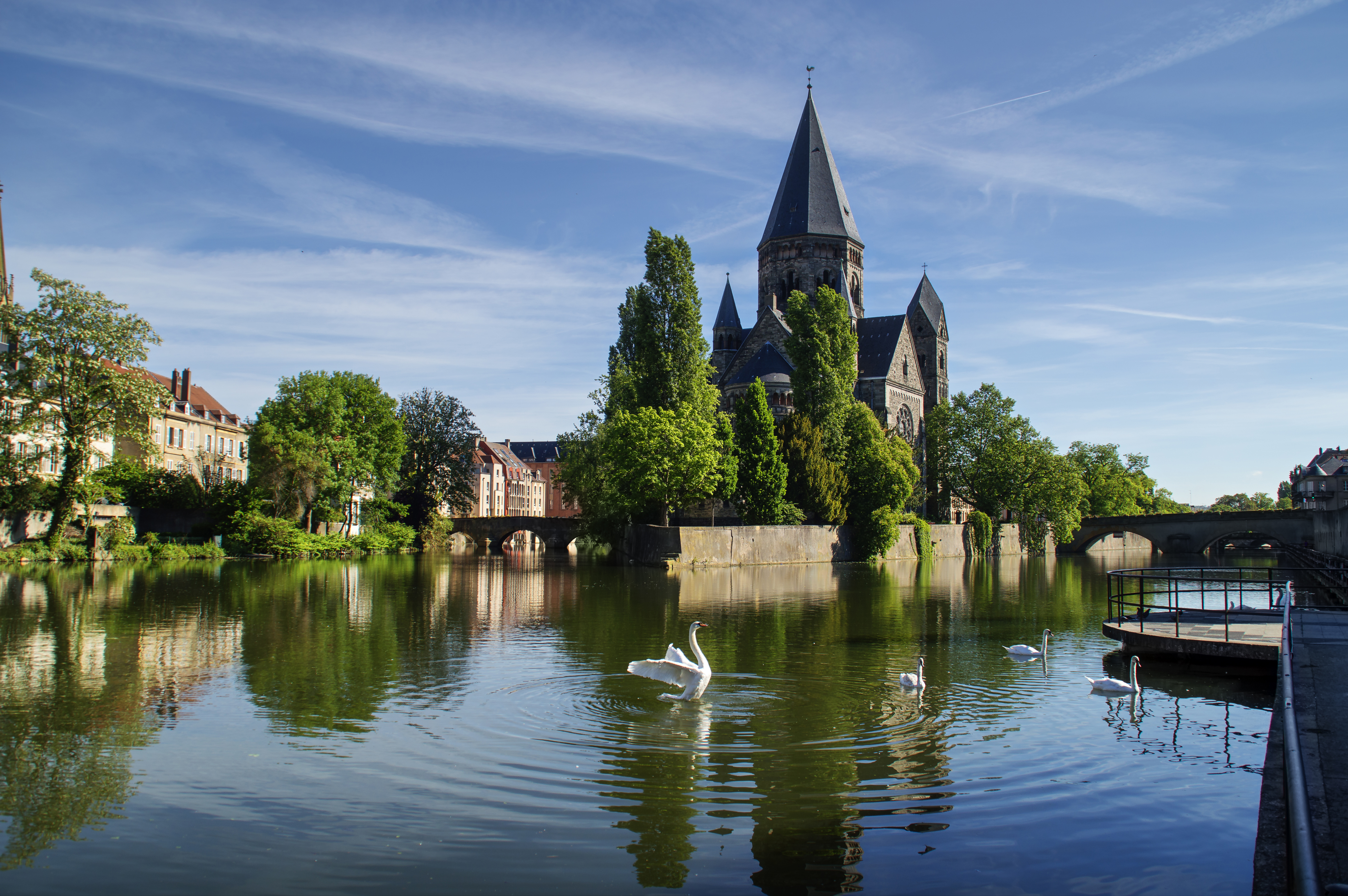
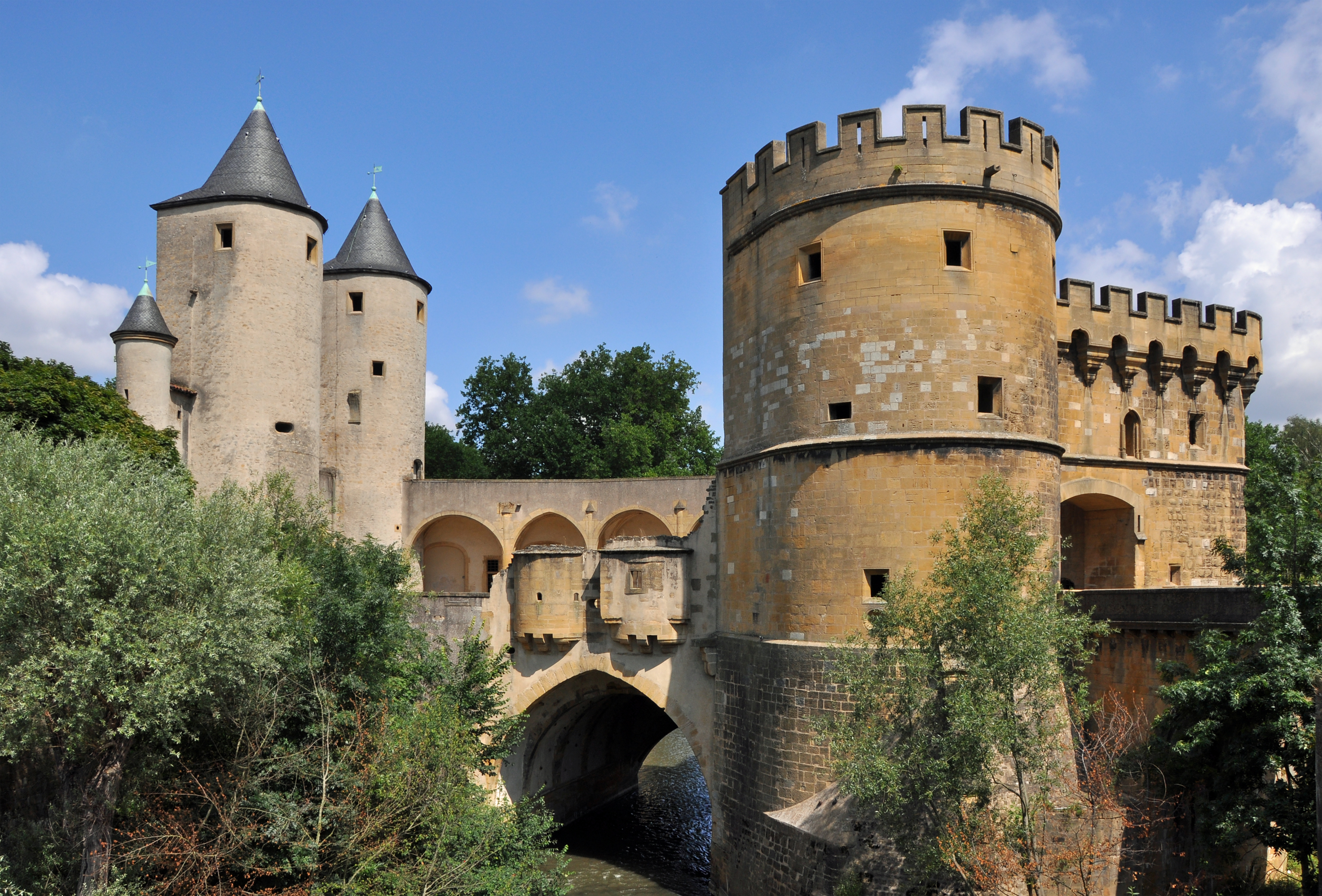
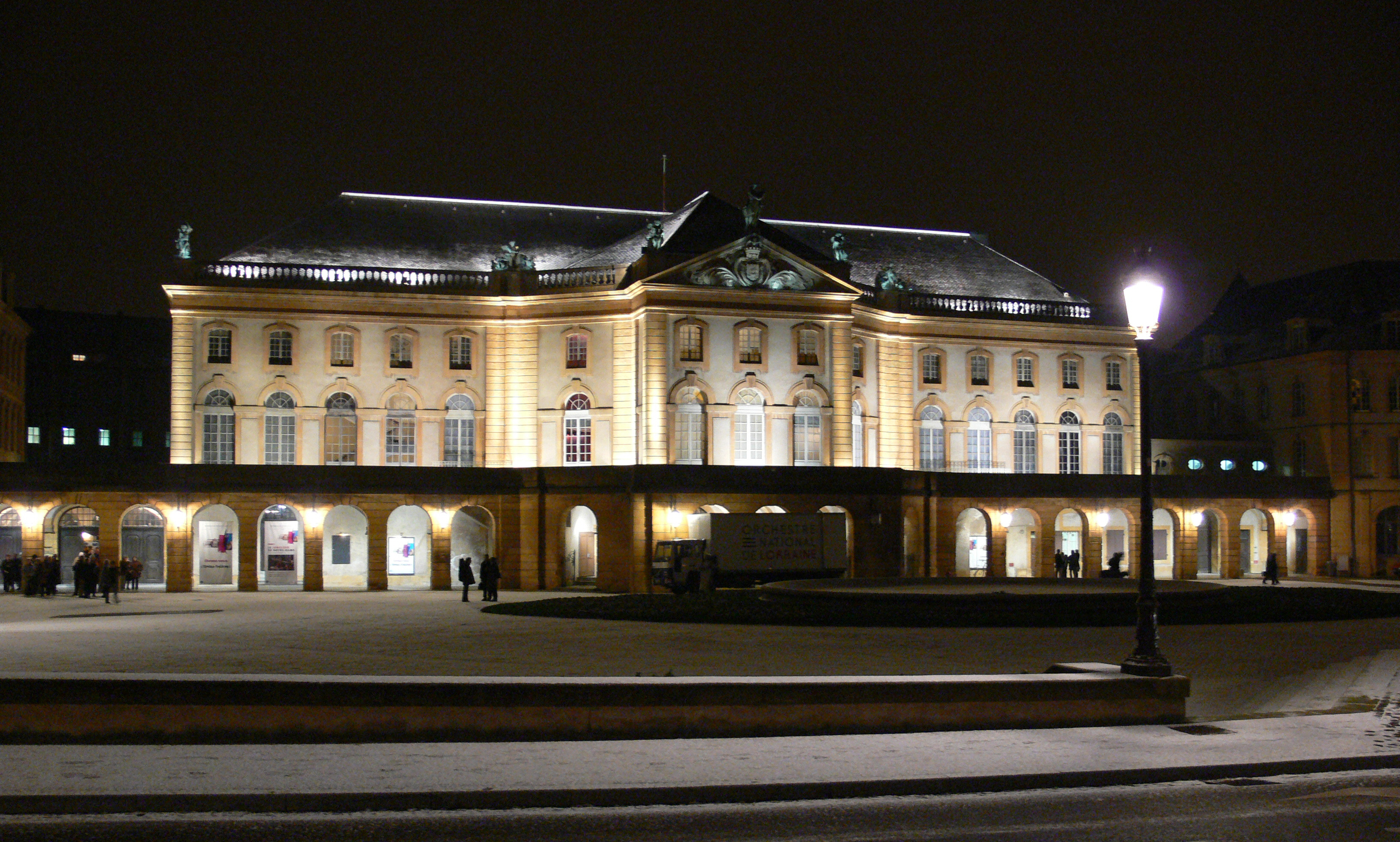
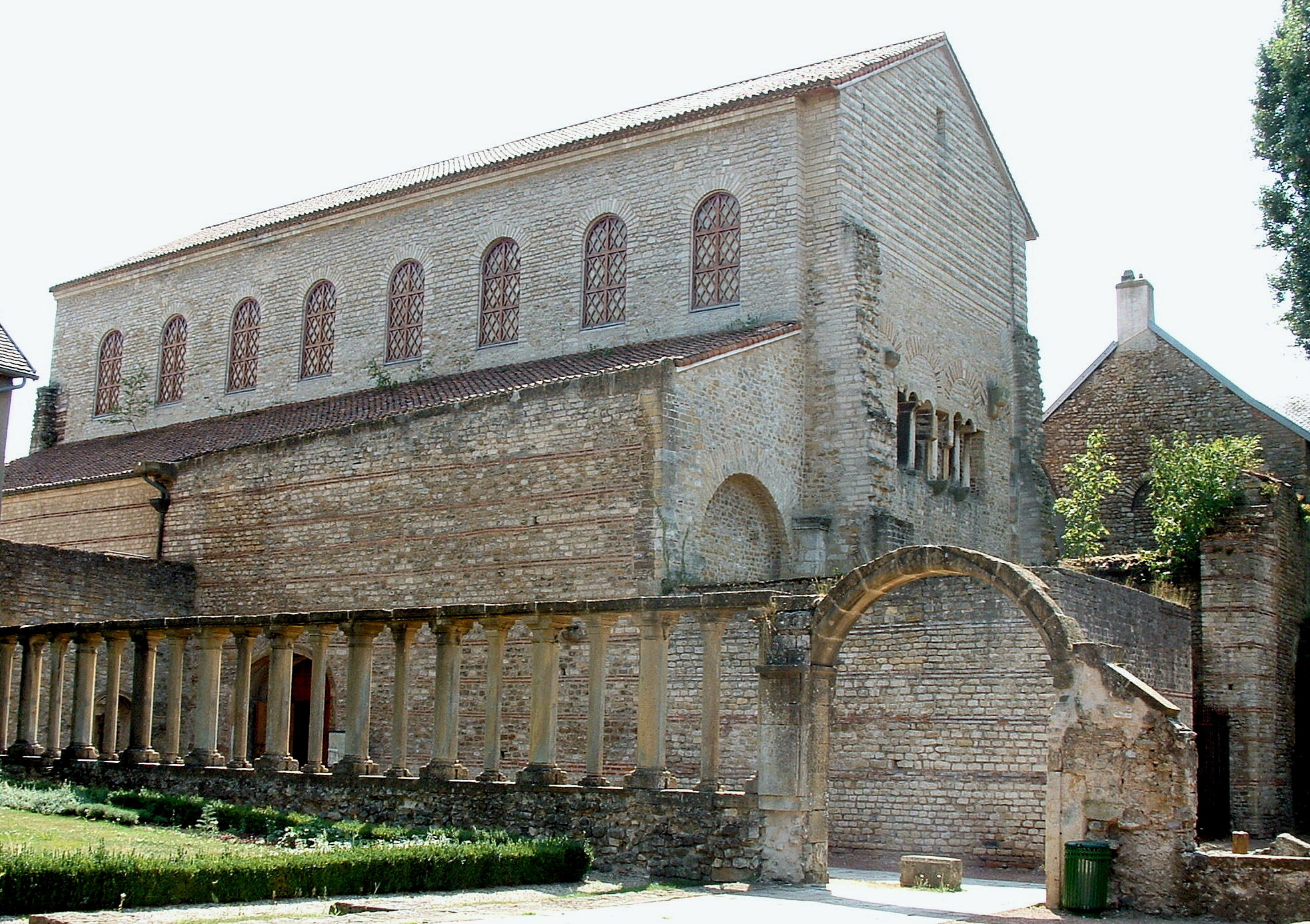
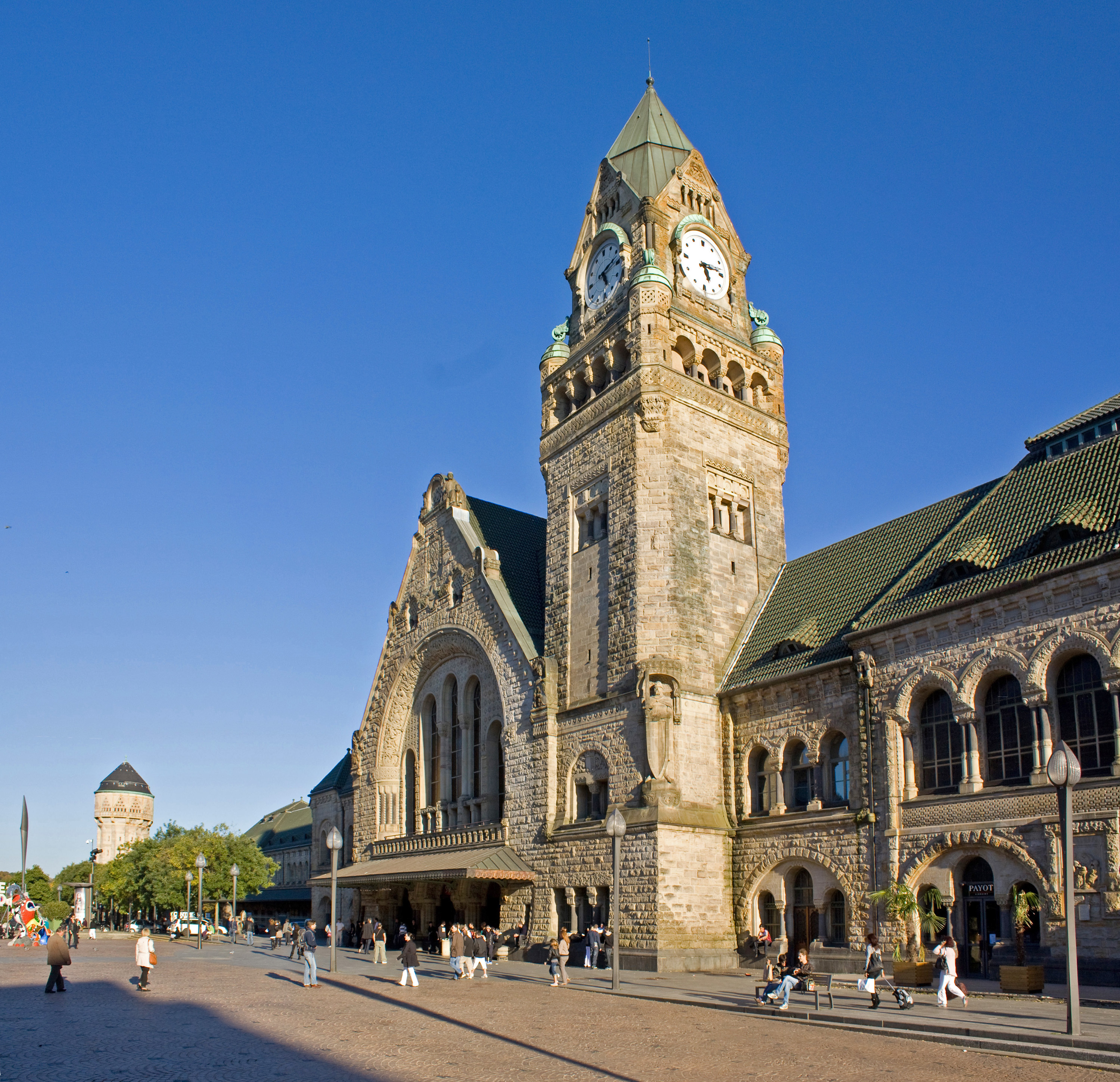
- Aerial view of Metz with the Cathedral of Saint Stephen Imperial Quarter of Metz Temple Neuf Germans' Gate Opéra-Théâtre de Metz Métropole Basilica of Saint-Pierre-aux-Nonnains Metz-Ville station

- Flag Coat of arms
- Location of Metz
- Location within France Location within Grand Est
- Coordinates: 49°07′13″N 6°10′40″E
- Country: France
- Region: Grand Est
- Department: Moselle
- Arrondissement: Metz
- Canton: 3 cantons
- Intercommunality: Metz Métropole

Government
  - Mayor (2026–32): François Grosdidier
- Area^{1}: 41.94 km^{2} (16.19 sq mi)
  - Urban: 308.8 km^{2} (119.2 sq mi)
  - Metro: 1,877.2 km^{2} (724.8 sq mi)
- Highest elevation: 256 m (840 ft)
- Lowest elevation: 162 m (531 ft)
- Population (2023): 122,572
  - Density: 2,923/km^{2} (7,569/sq mi)
  - Urban (2018): 285,930
  - Urban density: 925.9/km^{2} (2,398/sq mi)
  - Metro (2018): 367,851
  - Metro density: 195.96/km^{2} (507.53/sq mi)
- Demonym(s): Messin (masculine); Messine (feminine)
- Time zone: UTC+01:00 (CET)
  - Summer (DST): UTC+02:00 (CEST)
- INSEE/Postal code: 57463 /57000
- Website: metz.fr
- ^{1} French Land Register data, which excludes lakes, ponds, glaciers > 1 km^{2} (0.386 sq mi or 247 acres) and river estuaries.

Metz (/mɛts/ METS; French: [mɛs]; Latin: Divodurum Mediomatricorum, then Mettis) is a city in northeast France located at the confluence of the Moselle and the Seille rivers. Metz is the prefecture of the Moselle department and the seat of the parliament of the Grand Est region. Located near the tripoint along the junction of France, Germany and Luxembourg, the city forms a central part of the European Greater Region and the SaarLorLux euroregion.

Metz has a rich 3,000-year history, having variously been a Celtic oppidum, an important Gallo-Roman city, the Merovingian capital of Austrasia, the birthplace of the Carolingian dynasty, a cradle of the Gregorian chant, and one of the oldest republics in Europe. The city has been steeped in French culture, but has been strongly influenced by German culture due to its location and history.

Because of its historical, cultural and architectural background, Metz has been submitted on France's UNESCO World Heritage Tentative List. The city features noteworthy buildings such as the Gothic Saint-Stephen Cathedral with its largest expanse of stained-glass windows in the world, the Basilica of Saint-Pierre-aux-Nonnains being the oldest church in France, its Imperial Station Palace displaying the apartment of the German Kaiser, or its Opera House, the oldest one working in France. Metz is home to some world-class venues including the Arsenal Concert Hall and the Centre Pompidou-Metz museum.

A basin of urban ecology, Metz gained its nickname of The Green City (French: La Ville Verte), as it has extensive open grounds and public gardens. The historic city centre is one of the largest commercial pedestrian areas in France.

A historic garrison town, Metz is the economic heart of the Lorraine region, specialising in information technology and automotive industries. Metz is home to the University of Lorraine, Georgia Tech Europe, and a centre for applied research and development in the materials sector, notably in metallurgy and metallography, the heritage of the Lorraine region's past in the iron and steel industry.

== Etymology ==
In ancient times, the town was known as "city of Mediomatrici", being inhabited by the tribe of the same name. After its integration into the Roman Empire, the city was called Divodurum Mediomatricum, meaning Holy Village or Holy Fortress of the Mediomatrici, then it was known as Mediomatrix. During the 5th century AD, the name evolved to "Mettis", which gave rise to the current spelling, Metz, but also spellings such as Mès, which are no longer used, but reflect its actual pronunciation in French (like "mess").

== History ==
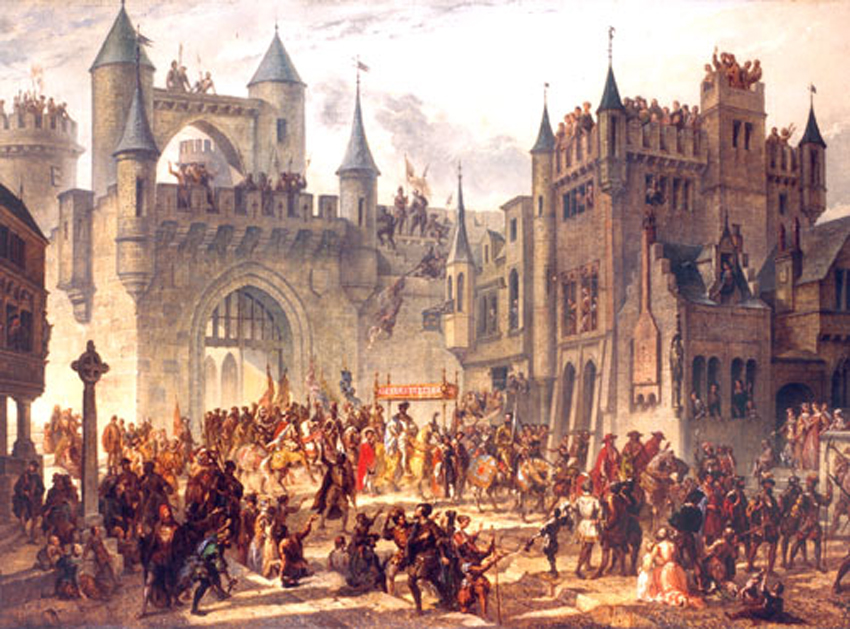
Henry II of France entering Metz in 1552, putting an end to the Republic of Metz.

Metz has a recorded history dating back over 2,000 years. Before the conquest of Gaul by Julius Caesar in 52 BC, it was the oppidum of the Celtic Mediomatrici tribe. Integrated into the Roman Empire, Metz became quickly one of the principal towns of Gaul with a population of 40,000, until the barbarian depredations and its transfer to the Franks about the end of the 5th century. The city was sacked by the Huns under Attila in 451. Between the 6th and 8th centuries, the city was the residence of the Merovingian kings of Austrasia. After the Treaty of Verdun in 843, Metz became the capital of the Kingdom of Lotharingia and was ultimately integrated into the Holy Roman Empire, being granted semi-independent status. During the 12th century, Metz became a republic and the Republic of Metz stood until the 15th century.

With the signature of the Treaty of Chambord in 1552, Metz passed into the hands of the Kings of France. As the German Protestant Princes who traded Metz (alongside Toul and Verdun) for the promise of French military assistance, had no authority to cede territory of the Holy Roman Empire, the change of jurisdiction was not recognised by the Holy Roman Empire until the Treaty of Westphalia in 1648. Under French rule, Metz was selected as capital of the Three Bishoprics and became a strategic fortified town. With creation of the departments by the Estates-General of 1789, Metz was chosen as capital of the Department of Moselle.

Although largely French-speaking, after the Franco-Prussian War and under the Treaty of Frankfurt of 1871 the city became part of the German Empire, being part of the Imperial Territory of Alsace-Lorraine and serving as capital of the Bezirk Lothringen.

Metz remained German until the end of the First World War, when it reverted to France. However, after the Battle of France during the Second World War, the city was annexed by Nazi Germany. In 1944, the attack on the city by the U.S. Third Army removed the city from German rule and Metz reverted one more time to France after World War II.

During the 1950s, Metz was chosen to be the capital of the newly created Lorraine region. With the creation of the European Community and the later European Union, the city has become central to the Greater Region and the SaarLorLux Euroregion.

== Geography ==
Metz is located on the banks of the Moselle and the Seille rivers, 43 km (27 mi) from the Schengen tripoint where the borders of France, Germany and Luxembourg meet. The city was built in a place where many branches of the Moselle river create several islands, which are encompassed within the urban planning.

The terrain of Metz forms part of the Paris Basin and presents a plateau relief cut by river valleys presenting cuestas in the north–south direction. Metz and its surrounding countryside are included in the forest and crop Lorraine Regional Natural Park, covering a total area of 205,000 ha (506,566 acres).

=== Climate ===
Lorraine has an oceanic climate tending to continental humid. The summers are warm and humid, sometimes stormy, and the warmest month of the year is July, when daytime temperatures average approximately 25 °C (77.0 °F). The winters are cold but not often snowy with temperature dropping to an average low of −0.5 °C (31.1 °F) in January. Lows can be much colder through the night and early morning and rare snow can fall during a period extending from November to February.

The length of the day varies significantly over the course of the year. The shortest day is 21 December with 7:30 hours of sunlight; the longest day is 20 June with 16:30 hours of sunlight. The median cloud cover is 93% and does not vary substantially over the course of the year.

Climate data for Metz - Frescaty (MZM), elevation: 192 m (630 ft) (1991–2020 normals, extremes 1940–present)
Month	Jan	Feb	Mar	Apr	May	Jun	Jul	Aug	Sep	Oct	Nov	Dec	Year
Record high °C (°F)	16.1 (61.0)	20.8 (69.4)	25.1 (77.2)	29.6 (85.3)	33.2 (91.8)	40.6 (105.1)	39.7 (103.5)	39.5 (103.1)	34.3 (93.7)	28.0 (82.4)	23.3 (73.9)	18.1 (64.6)	40.6 (105.1)
Mean daily maximum °C (°F)	5.4 (41.7)	7.1 (44.8)	11.6 (52.9)	16.0 (60.8)	20.0 (68.0)	23.6 (74.5)	25.8 (78.4)	25.5 (77.9)	20.9 (69.6)	15.4 (59.7)	9.4 (48.9)	6.0 (42.8)	15.6 (60.1)
Daily mean °C (°F)	2.7 (36.9)	3.6 (38.5)	7.0 (44.6)	10.5 (50.9)	14.5 (58.1)	17.9 (64.2)	20.1 (68.2)	19.7 (67.5)	15.7 (60.3)	11.3 (52.3)	6.5 (43.7)	3.5 (38.3)	11.1 (52.0)
Mean daily minimum °C (°F)	0.0 (32.0)	0.1 (32.2)	2.4 (36.3)	4.9 (40.8)	9.0 (48.2)	12.3 (54.1)	14.4 (57.9)	14.0 (57.2)	10.4 (50.7)	7.2 (45.0)	3.6 (38.5)	1.0 (33.8)	6.6 (43.9)
Record low °C (°F)	−20.1 (−4.2)	−23.2 (−9.8)	−15.3 (4.5)	−5.1 (22.8)	−2.5 (27.5)	1.9 (35.4)	4.3 (39.7)	3.9 (39.0)	−1.1 (30.0)	−6.2 (20.8)	−11.7 (10.9)	−17.0 (1.4)	−23.2 (−9.8)
Average precipitation mm (inches)	61.9 (2.44)	56.0 (2.20)	51.1 (2.01)	45.1 (1.78)	56.9 (2.24)	56.1 (2.21)	59.8 (2.35)	59.3 (2.33)	61.5 (2.42)	64.8 (2.55)	64.5 (2.54)	76.5 (3.01)	713.5 (28.09)
Average precipitation days (≥ 1.0 mm)	11.1	10.0	9.9	8.3	9.6	9.1	8.9	9.0	8.4	10.3	11.4	12.2	118.1
Mean monthly sunshine hours	52.7	79.1	127.1	177.0	201.5	219.0	226.3	213.9	159.0	99.2	48.0	40.3	1,643.1
Source 1: Meteociel
Source 2: Weather Atlas (sunshine hours)

== Demographics ==
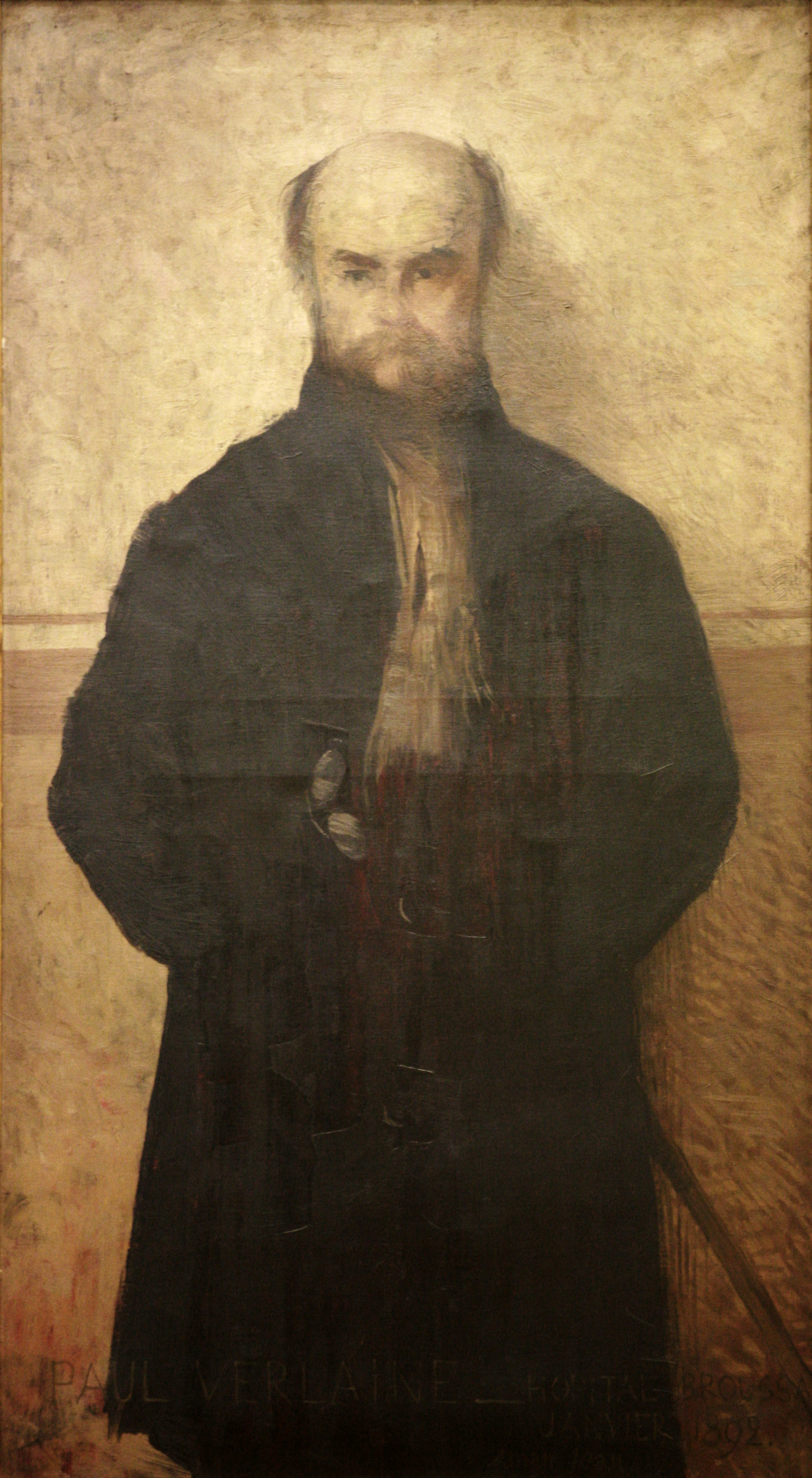
Paul Verlaine by Edmond Aman-Jean, 1892, oil on canvas, Golden Courtyard museums Metz with its magnificent open countries, prolific undulating rivers, wooded hillsides, vineyards of fire; cathedral all in volute, where the wind sings as a flute, and responding to it via the Mutte: this big voice of the good Lord! — Paul Verlaine, Ode to Metz, Invectives, 1896

=== Population ===
The inhabitants of Metz are called Messin(e)s. Statistics on the ethnic and religious make up of the population of Metz are haphazard, as the French Republic prohibits making distinctions between citizens regarding race, beliefs, and political and philosophic opinions in the process of census taking.

As of 2022, the population of Metz was about 122,000, while the population of Metz metropolitan area was about 377,000. Through history, Metz's population has been affected by the vicissitudes of the wars and annexations involving the city, which have prevented continuous population growth. More recently, the city has suffered from the restructuring of the military and the metallurgy industry. The historical population for the current area of Metz municipality is as follows:

Historical population

Year	Pop.	±% p.a.
1793	36,878	—
1800	32,099	−1.96%
1806	39,131	+3.36%
1821	42,030	+0.48%
1836	42,793	+0.12%
1841	39,767	−1.46%
1861	56,888	+1.81%
1866	54,817	−0.74%
1871	51,332	−1.31%
1875	45,856	−2.78%
1880	53,131	+2.99%

Year	Pop.	±% p.a.
1885	54,072	+0.35%
1890	60,186	+2.17%
1895	59,794	−0.13%
1900	58,462	−0.45%
1905	60,419	+0.66%
1910	54,965	−1.87%
1921	62,311	+1.15%
1926	69,624	+2.24%
1931	78,767	+2.50%
1936	83,119	+1.08%
1946	70,105	−1.69%

Year	Pop.	±% p.a.
1954	85,701	+2.54%
1962	102,771	+2.30%
1968	107,537	+0.76%
1975	111,869	+0.57%
1982	114,232	+0.30%
1990	119,594	+0.58%
1999	123,776	+0.38%
2007	123,580	−0.02%
2012	119,551	−0.66%
2017	116,429	−0.53%
2023	122,572	+0.86%

Source: EHESS and INSEE

=== Notable people ===
Several well-known figures have been linked to the city of Metz throughout its history. Renowned Messins include poet Paul Verlaine, composer Ambroise Thomas and mathematician Jean-Victor Poncelet; numerous well-known German figures were also born in Metz notably during the annexation periods. Moreover, the city has been the residence of people such as writer François Rabelais, Cardinal Mazarin, political thinker Alexis de Tocqueville, artist and the inventor of the motion picture camera Louis Le Prince, French patriot and American Revolutionary War hero Marquis Gilbert du Motier de La Fayette, and Luxembourg-born German-French statesman Robert Schuman.

== Law and government ==
=== Local law ===
The local law (French: droit local) applied in Metz is a legal system that operates in parallel with French law. Created in 1919, it preserves the French laws applied in France before 1870 and maintained by the Germans during the annexation of Alsace-Lorraine, but repealed in the rest of France after 1871. It also maintains German laws enacted by the German Empire between 1871 and 1918, specific provisions adopted by the local authorities, and French laws that have been enacted after 1919 to be applicable only in Alsace-Lorraine. This specific local legislation encompasses different areas including religion, social work and finance.

The most striking of the legal differences between France and Alsace-Lorraine is the absence in Alsace-Lorraine of strict secularism, even though a constitutional right of freedom of religion is guaranteed by the French government. Alsace-Lorraine is still governed by a pre-1905 law established by the Concordat of 1801, which provides for the public subsidy of the Roman Catholic, Lutheran and Calvinist churches and the Jewish religion.

=== Administration ===
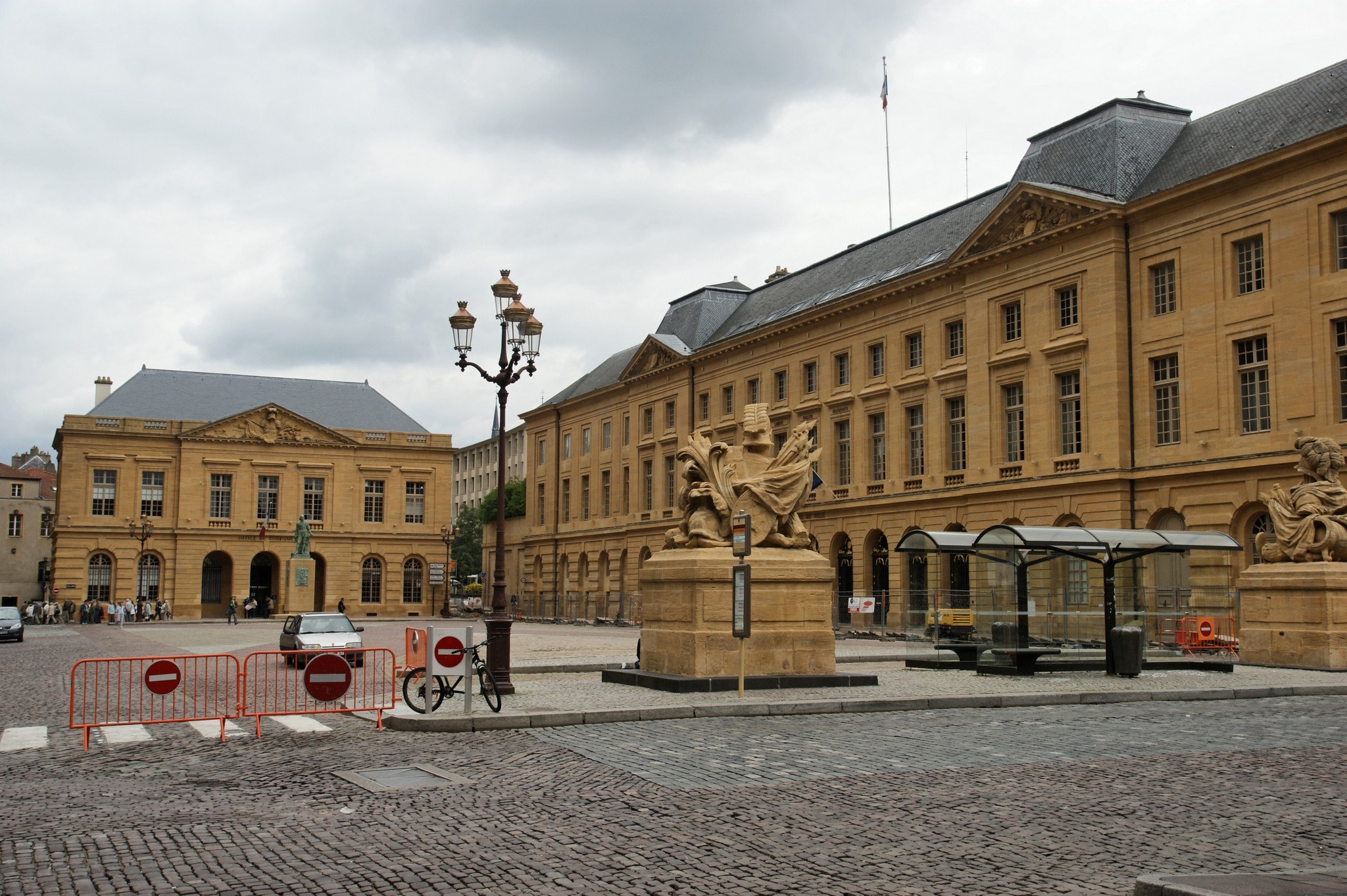
The Hôtel de Ville on the Place d'Armes

Like every commune of the present French Republic, Metz is managed by a mayor (French: maire) and a municipal council (French: conseil municipal), democratically elected by two-round proportional voting for six years. The mayor is assisted by 54 municipal councillors, and the municipal council is held on the last Thursday of every month. Since 2008, the mayor of Metz has been socialist Dominique Gros.

The city belongs to the Metz Metropole union of cities, which includes the 40 cities of the Metz urban agglomeration. Metz is the prefecture of the Moselle based in the former Intendant Palace. In addition, Metz is the seat of the parliament of the Grand Est region, hosted in the former Saint-Clement Abbey.

=== City administrative divisions ===
The city of Metz is divided into 14 administrative divisions:

Number	District	Sights	Location
1	Devant-les-Ponts	Desvalliere barracks	
2	Metz-Nord Patrotte	Harbour zone	
3	Les îles	Grand East regional parliament, University of Lorraine, Fabert High School, Cogeneration Plant	
4	Plantières-Queuleu	Queuleu Fort, Museum of Resistance and Deportation of Metz	
5	Bellecroix	Bellecroix Fort	
6	Metz-Vallières	Robert Schuman private hospital	
7	Borny	University of Lorraine, Contemporary Music Venue	
8	Grigy-Technopôle	Metz Science Park, Arts et Métiers ParisTech, University of Lorraine, Georgia Tech Lorraine, Supélec	
9	Grange aux Bois	Trade Fair Center	
10	Sablon	Centre Pompidou-Metz, Indoor Sports Arena, Caisse d'Épargne regional headquarters, Metz-Metropole Conference Centre Hall (project)	
11	Magny	Saint-Clement and Leusiotte woods	
12	Nouvelle Ville	Imperial Station-Palace, INSEE and Banque Populaire regional headquarters, Central Post Office, Chamber of Commerce	
13	Metz Centre	City Hall, Prefecture, Cathedral of Saint Stephen, Temple Neuf, Arsenal Concert Hall, Opera House	
14	Ancienne Ville	Germans' Gate, Golden Courtyard Museum, Regional Contemporary Art Fund of Lorraine, Jazz Concert Venue	

== Cityscape and environmental policy ==
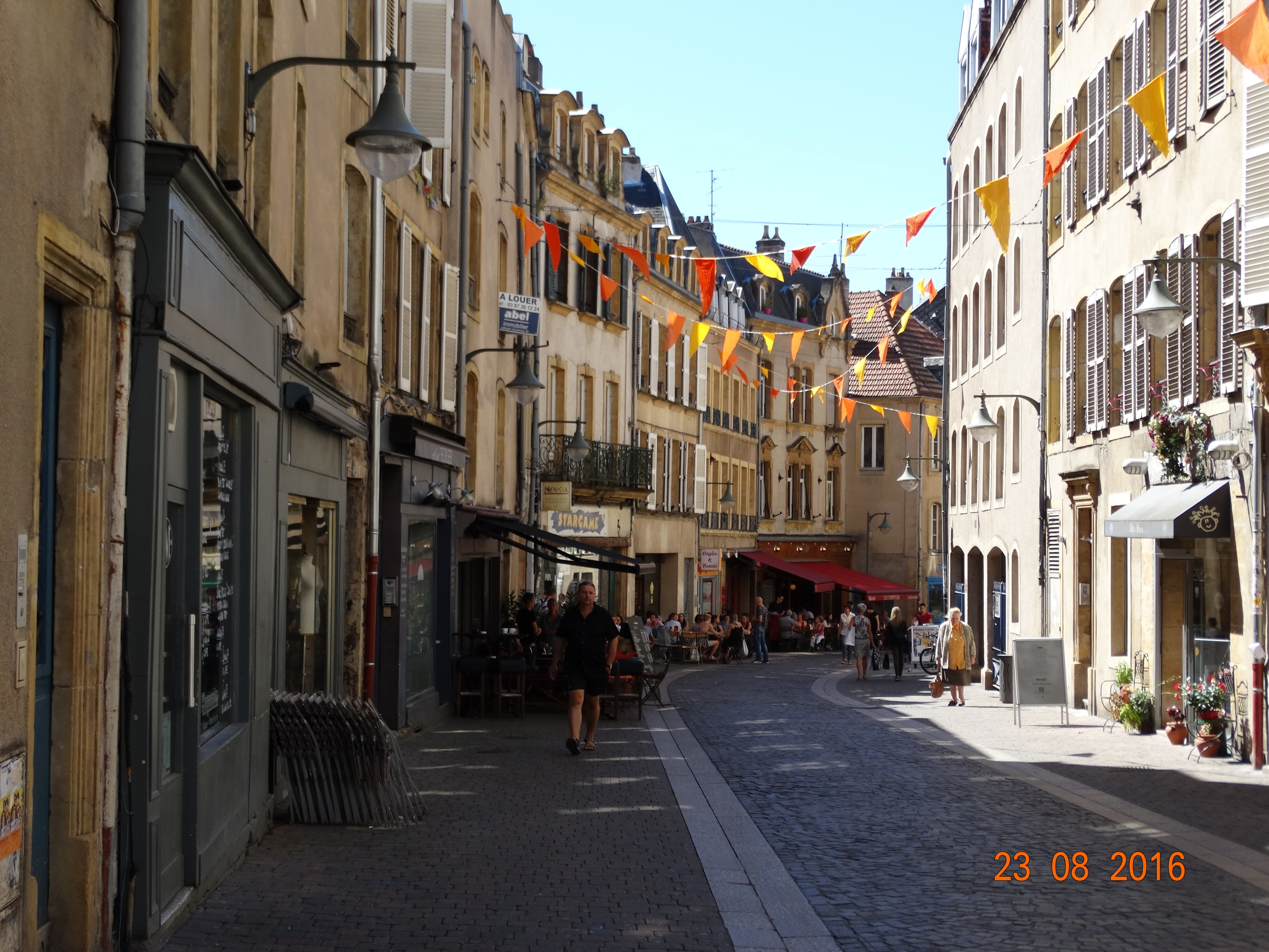
Street in old city

Metz contains a mishmash of architectural layers, bearing witness to centuries of history at the crossroads of different cultures, and features a number of architectural landmarks. The city possesses one of the largest Urban Conservation Areas in France, and more than 100 of the city's buildings are classified on the Monument Historique list. Because of its historical and cultural background, Metz is designated as French Town of Art and History, and has been submitted on to France's UNESCO World Heritage Tentative List.

The city is famous for its yellow limestone architecture, a result of the extensive use of Jaumont stone. The historic district has kept part of the Gallo-Roman city with Divodurum's Cardo Maximus, then called Via Scarponensis (today the Trinitaires, Taison and Serpenoise streets), and the Decumanus Maximus (today En Fournirue and d'Estrées streets). At the Cardo and Decumanus intersection was situated the Roman forum, today the Saint-Jacques Square.

=== Architecture ===
The Centre Pompidou-Metz, a symbol of modern Metz

The Music Box, a high-quality concert and recording studio venue dedicated to the modern forms of art music, in the Borny District. The venue has been erected in a cité HLM as an urban renewal effort

From its Gallo-Roman past, the city preserves vestiges of the thermae (in the basement of the Golden Courtyard museum), parts of the aqueduct, and the Basilica of Saint-Pierre-aux-Nonnains.

Saint Louis' square with its vaulted arcades and a Knights Templar chapel remains a major symbol of the city's High Medieval heritage. The Gothic Saint-Stephen Cathedral, several churches and Hôtels, and two remarkable municipal granaries reflect the Late Middle Ages. Examples of Renaissance architecture can be seen in Hôtels from the 16th century, such as the House of Heads (French: Maison des Têtes).

The Hôtel de Ville (City Hall) and the buildings surrounding the town square are by French architect Jacques-François Blondel, who was awarded the task of redesigning and modernizing the centre of Metz by the Royal Academy of Architecture in 1755 the context of the Enlightenment. Neoclassical buildings from the 18th century, such as the Opera House, the Intendant Palace (the present-day prefecture), and the Royal Governor's Palace (the present-day courthouse) built by Charles-Louis Clérisseau, are also found in the city.

The Imperial District was built during the first annexation of Metz by the German Empire. In order to "germanise" the city, Emperor Wilhelm II decided to create a new district shaped by a distinctive blend of Germanic architecture, including Renaissance, neo-Romanesque and neo-Classical, mixed with elements of Art Nouveau, Art Deco, Alsatian and mock-Bavarian styles. Instead of Jaumont stone, commonly used everywhere else in the city, stone used in the Rhineland, such as pink and grey sandstone, granite and basalt were used. The district features noteworthy buildings including the rail station and the Central Post Office by German architect Jürgen Kröger.

Modern architecture can also be seen in the town with works of French architects Roger-Henri Expert (Sainte-Thérèse-de-l'Enfant-Jésus church, 1934), Georges-Henri Pingusson (Fire Station, 1960) and Jean Dubuisson (subdivisions, 1960s). The refurbishment of the former Ney Arsenal as a Concert Hall in 1989 and the erection of the Metz Arena in 2002, by Spanish and French architects Ricardo Bofill and French Paul Chemetov represent the Postmodern movement.

The Centre Pompidou-Metz museum in the Amphitheatre District represents a strong architectural initiative to mark the entrance of Metz into the 21st century. Designed by Japanese architect Shigeru Ban, the building is remarkable for the complex, innovative carpentry of its roof, and integrates concepts of sustainable architecture. The project encompasses the architecture of two recipients of the Pritzker Architecture Prize, Shigeru Ban (2014) and French Christian de Portzamparc (1994). The Amphitheatre District is also conceived by French architects Nicolas Michelin, Jean-Paul Viguier and Jean-Michel Wilmotte, and designer Philippe Starck. The urban project is expected to be completed by 2023. Further, a contemporary music venue designed by contextualist French architect Rudy Ricciotti stands in the Borny District.

=== Urban ecology ===
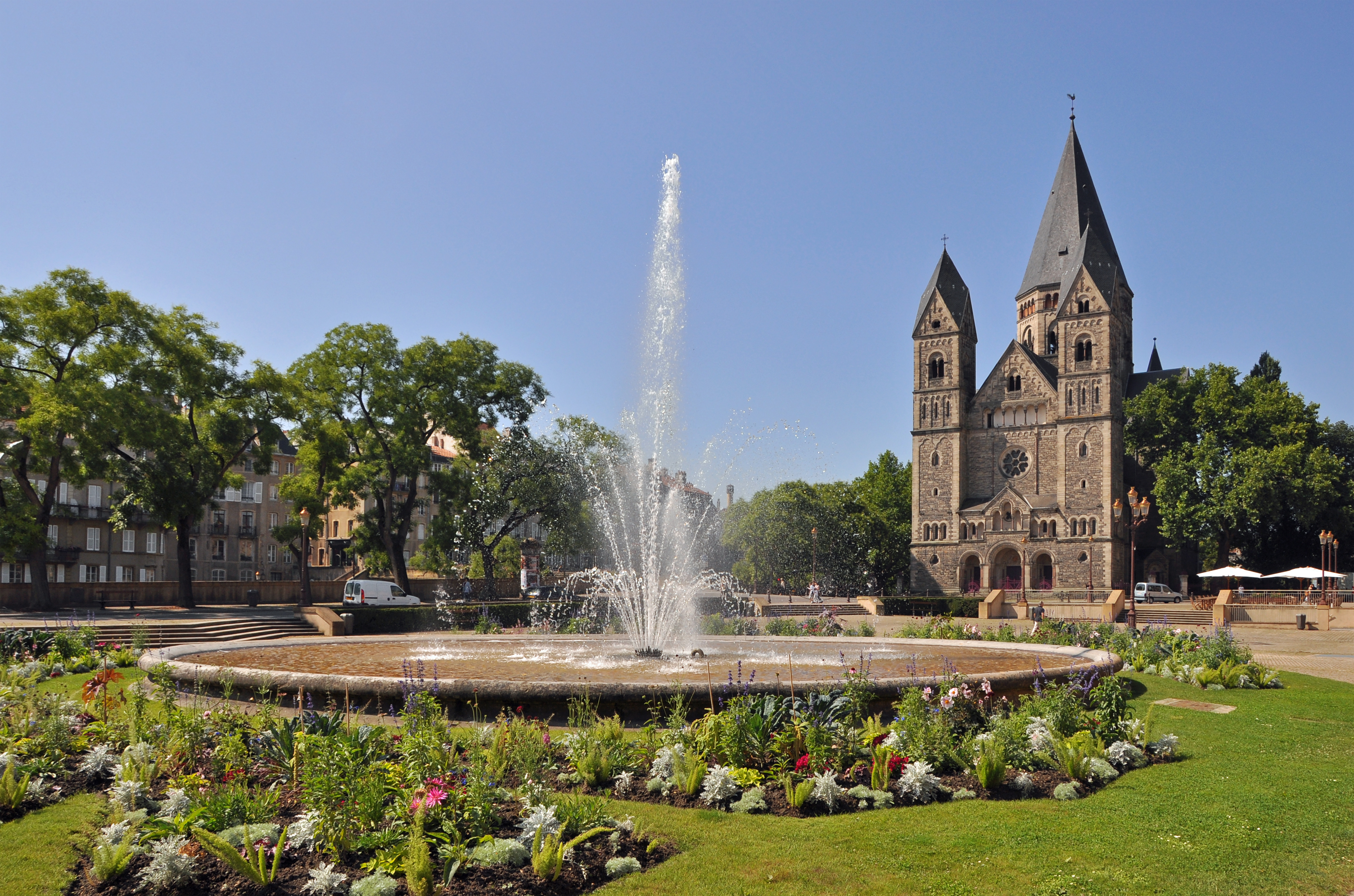
Water games in the Islands District

Under the leadership of such people as botanist Jean-Marie Pelt, Metz pioneered a policy of urban ecology during the early 1970s. Because of the failure of post-war urban planning and housing estate development in Europe during the 1960s, mostly based on the concepts of CIAM, Jean-Marie Pelt, then municipal councillor of Metz, initiated a new approach to the urban environment.

Based initially on the ideas of the Chicago School, Pelt's theories pleaded for better integration of humans into their environment and developed a concept centered on the relationship between "stone and water". His policy was realized in Metz by the establishment of extensive open areas surrounding the Moselle and the Seille rivers and the development of large pedestrian areas. As a result, Metz has over 37 m^{2} (400 sq ft) of open areas per inhabitant in the form of numerous public gardens in the city.

The principles of urban ecology are still applied in Metz with the implementation of a local Agenda 21 action plan. The municipal ecological policy encompasses the sustainable refurbishment of ancient buildings, the erection of sustainable districts and buildings, green public transport, and the creation of public gardens by means of landscape architecture.

Additionally, the city has developed its own combined heat and power station, using waste wood biomass from the surrounding forests as a renewable energy source. With a thermal efficiency above 80%, the 45MW boiler of the plant provides electricity and heat for 44,000 dwellings. The Metz power station is the first local producer and distributor of energy in France.

=== Military architecture ===
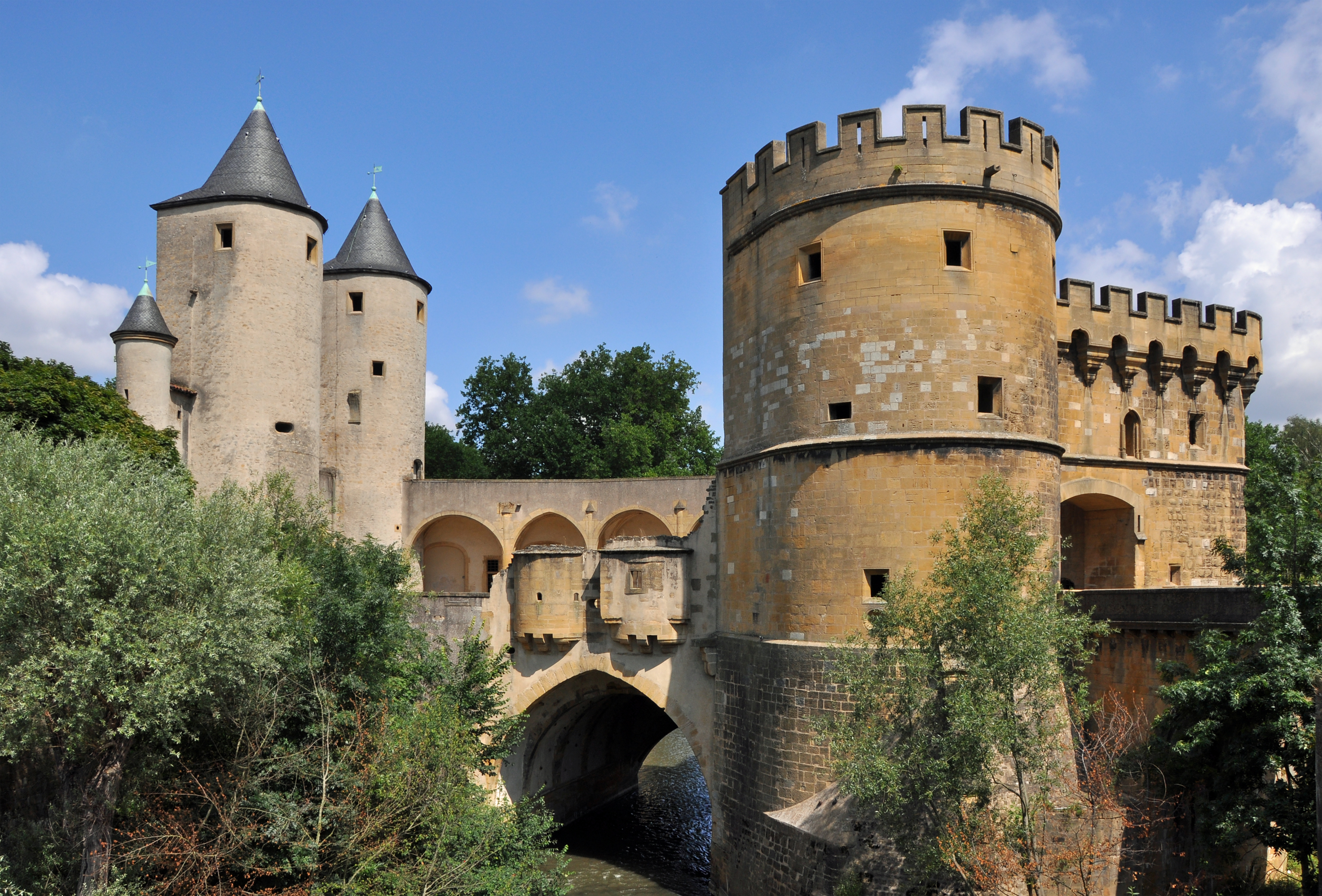
The Germans' Gate from the 13th century, one of the last medieval bridge castles found in France. Today, an exhibition hall

As a historic garrison town, Metz has been heavily influenced by military architecture throughout its history. From ancient history to the present, the city has been successively fortified and modified to accommodate the troops stationed there. Defensive walls from classical antiquity to the 20th century are still visible today, incorporated into the design of public gardens along the Moselle and Seille rivers. A medieval bridge castle from the 13th century, named Germans' Gate (French: Porte des Allemands), today converted into a convention and exhibition centre, has become one of the landmarks of the city. It is still possible to see parts of the 16th century citadel, as well as fortifications built in the 1740s by Louis de Cormontaigne but based on designs by Vauban. Important barracks, mostly from the 18th and 19th centuries, are spread around the city: some, which are of architectural interest, have been converted to civilian use, such as the Arsenal Concert Hall by Spanish architect Ricardo Bofill.

The extensive fortifications of Metz, which ring the city, include early examples of Séré de Rivières system forts. Other forts were incorporated into the Maginot Line. A hiking trail on the Saint-Quentin plateau passes through a former military training zone and ends at the now abandoned military forts, providing a vantage point from which to survey the city.

== Economy ==
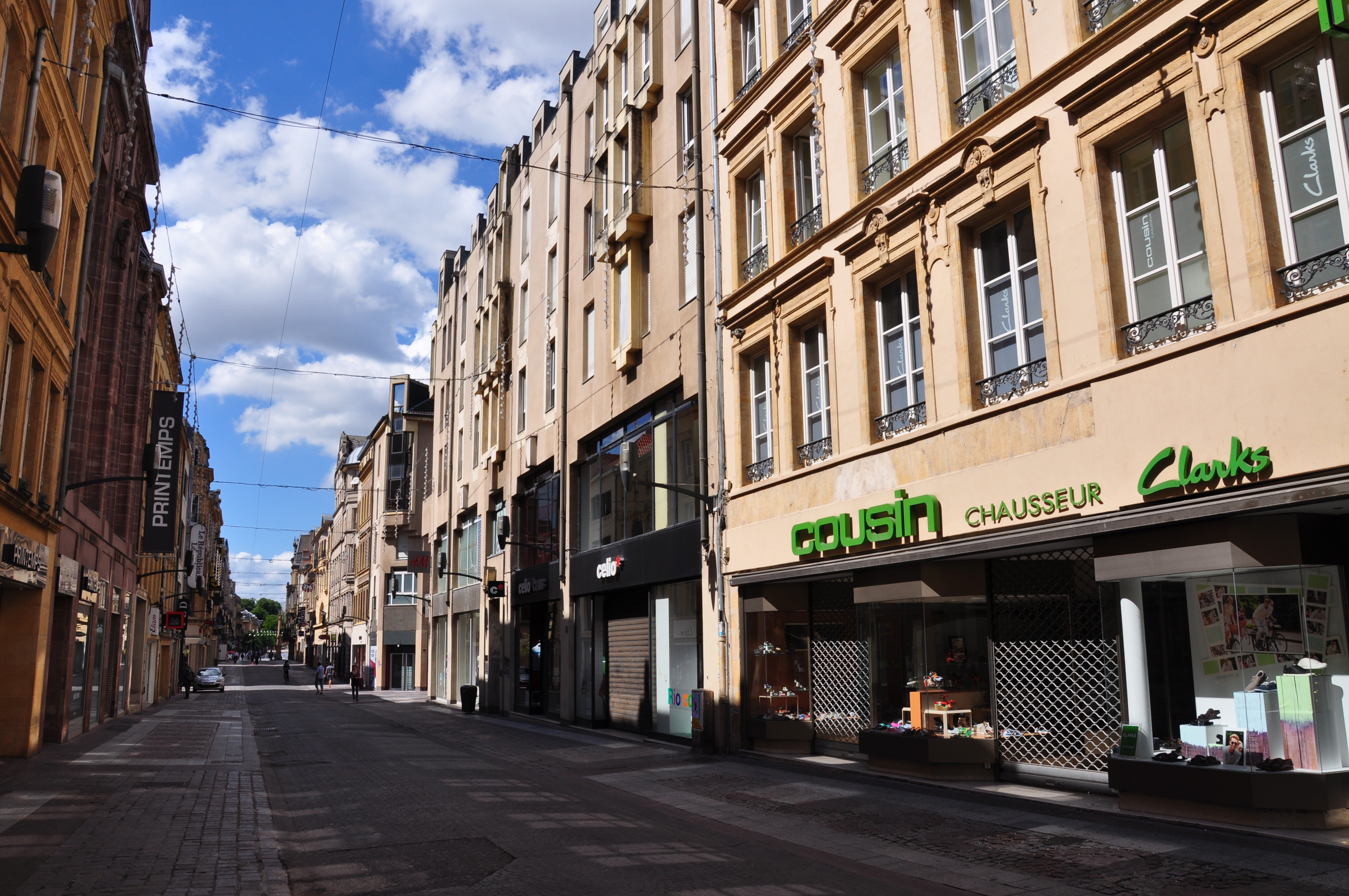
Rue Serpenoise, in the main pedestrian area.

Although the steel industry has historically dominated Moselle's economy, Metz's efforts at economic diversification have created a base in the sectors of commerce, tourism, information technology and the automotive industry. The city is the economic heart of the Lorraine region and around 73,000 people work daily within the urban agglomeration. The transport facilities found in the conurbation, including the international high-speed railway, motorway, inland connections and the local bus rapid transit system, have made the city a transport hub in the heart of the European Union. Metz is home to the biggest harbour handling cereals in France with over 4,000,000 tons/year.

Metz is home to the Moselle Chamber of Commerce. International companies such as PSA Peugeot Citroën, ArcelorMittal, SFR and TDF have established plants and centres in the Metz conurbation. Metz is also the regional headquarters of the Caisse d'Epargne and Banque Populaire banking groups.

Metz is an important commercial centre of northern France with France's biggest retailer federation, consisting of around 2,000 retailers. Important retail companies are found in the city, such as the Galeries Lafayette, the Printemps department store and the Fnac entertainment retail chain. The historic city centre displays one of the largest commercial pedestrian areas in France and a mall, the Saint-Jacques centre. In addition there are several multiplex movie theatres and malls found in the urban agglomeration.

In recent years, Metz municipality have promoted an ambitious policy of tourism development, including urban revitalization and refurbishment of buildings and public squares. This policy has been spurred by the creation of the Centre Pompidou-Metz in 2010. Since its inauguration, the institution has become the most popular cultural venue in France outside Paris, with 550,000 visitors per year. Meanwhile, Saint-Stephen Cathedral is the most visited building in the city, accommodating 652,000 visitors per year.

== Culture ==
=== Museums and exhibition halls ===
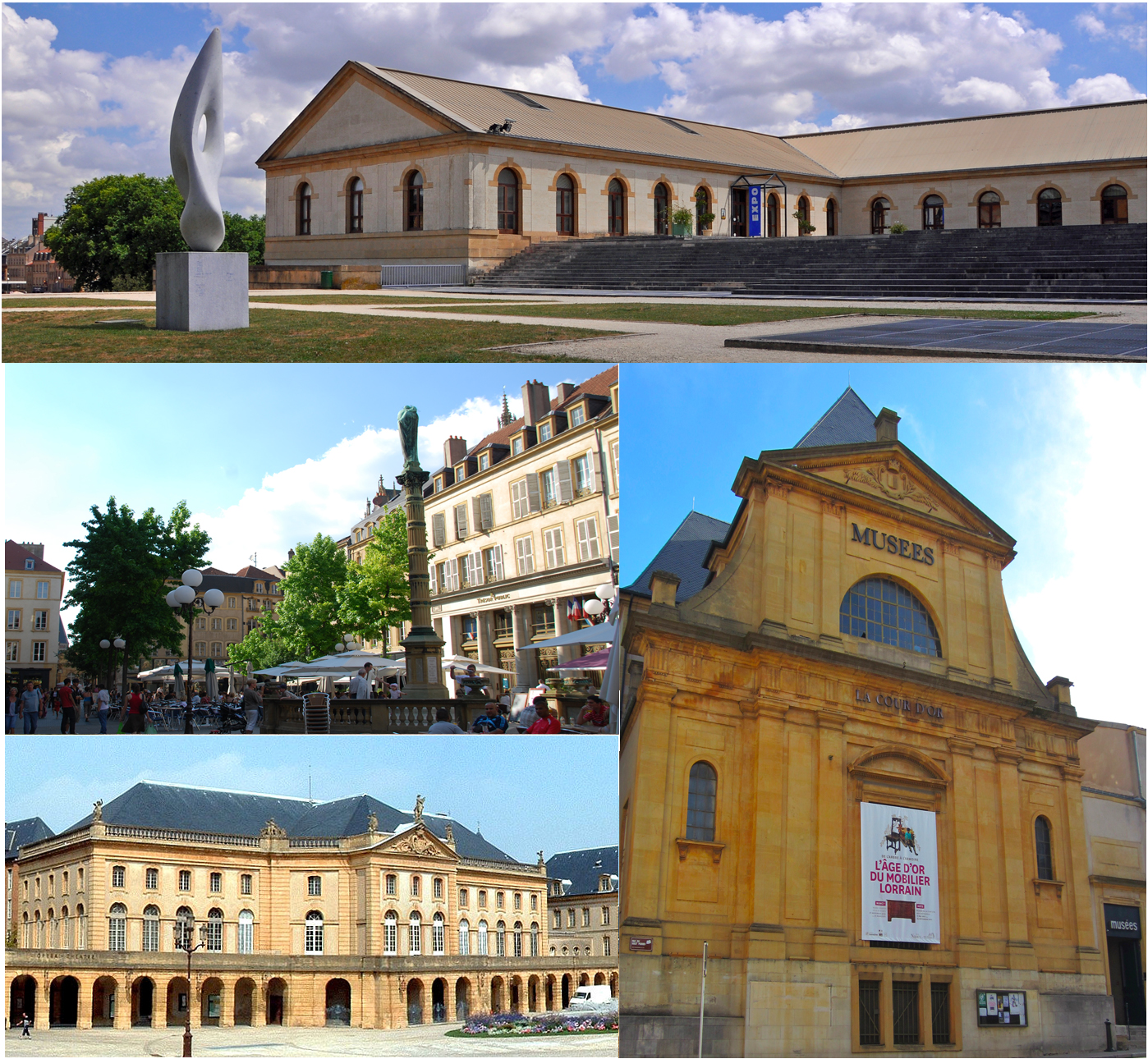
Some of the cultural venues in Metz, clockwise from top: the Arsenal, the Golden Courtyard, the Opera House, and the Saint-Jacques square

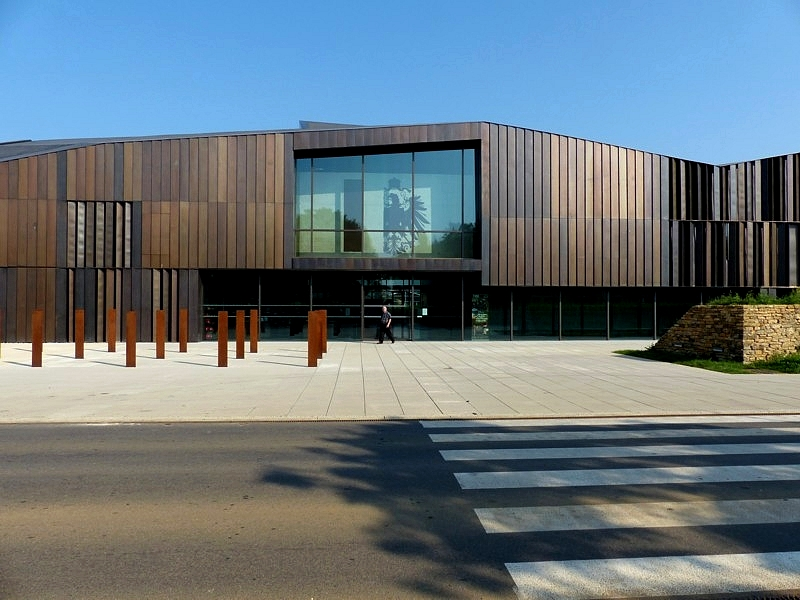
The Museum of the 1870 War and of the Annexion, the only museum in Europe dedicated to the Franco-Prussian War

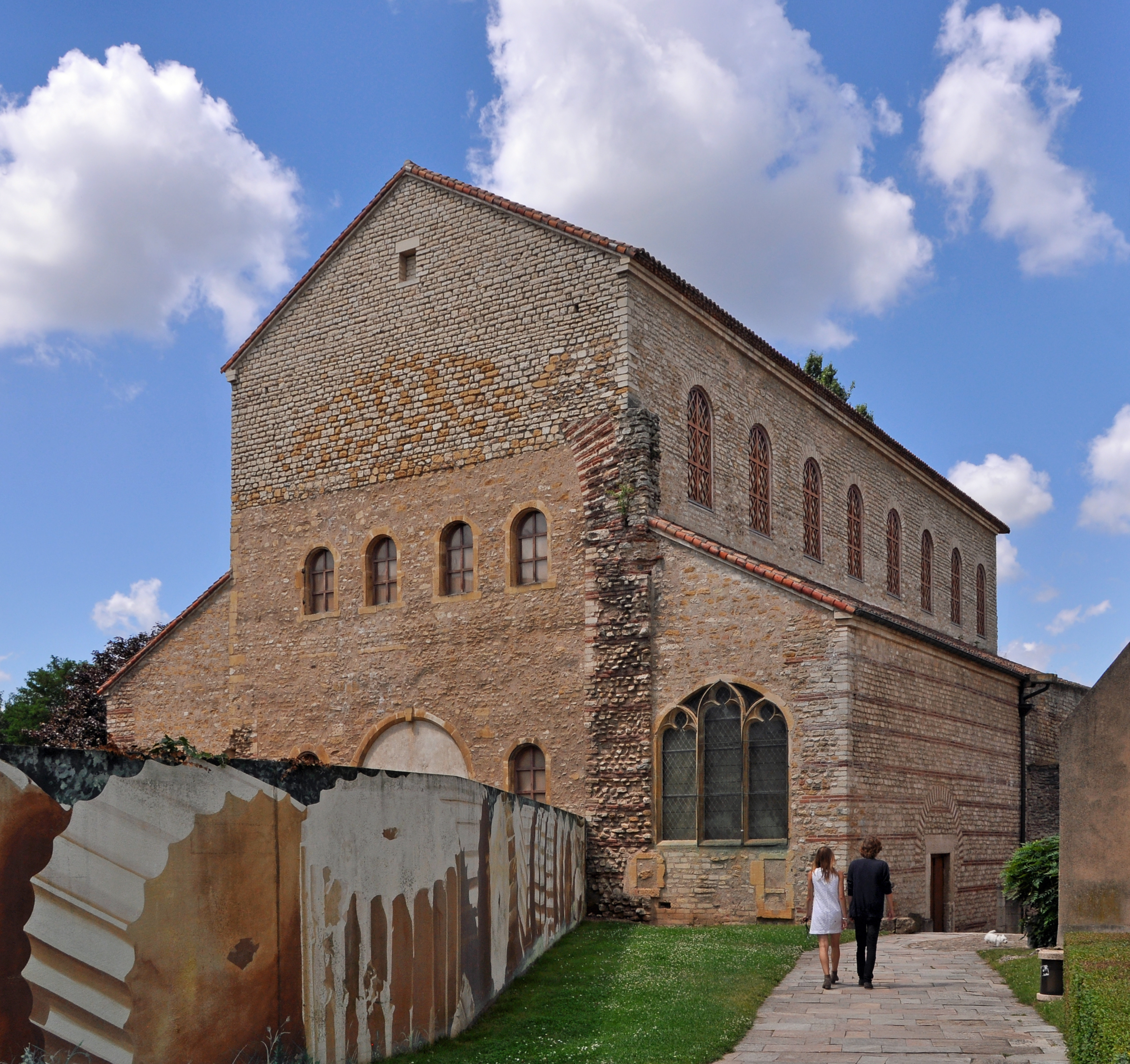
Basilica of Saint-Pierre-aux-Nonnains, the oldest church in France and cradle of the Gregorian Chant

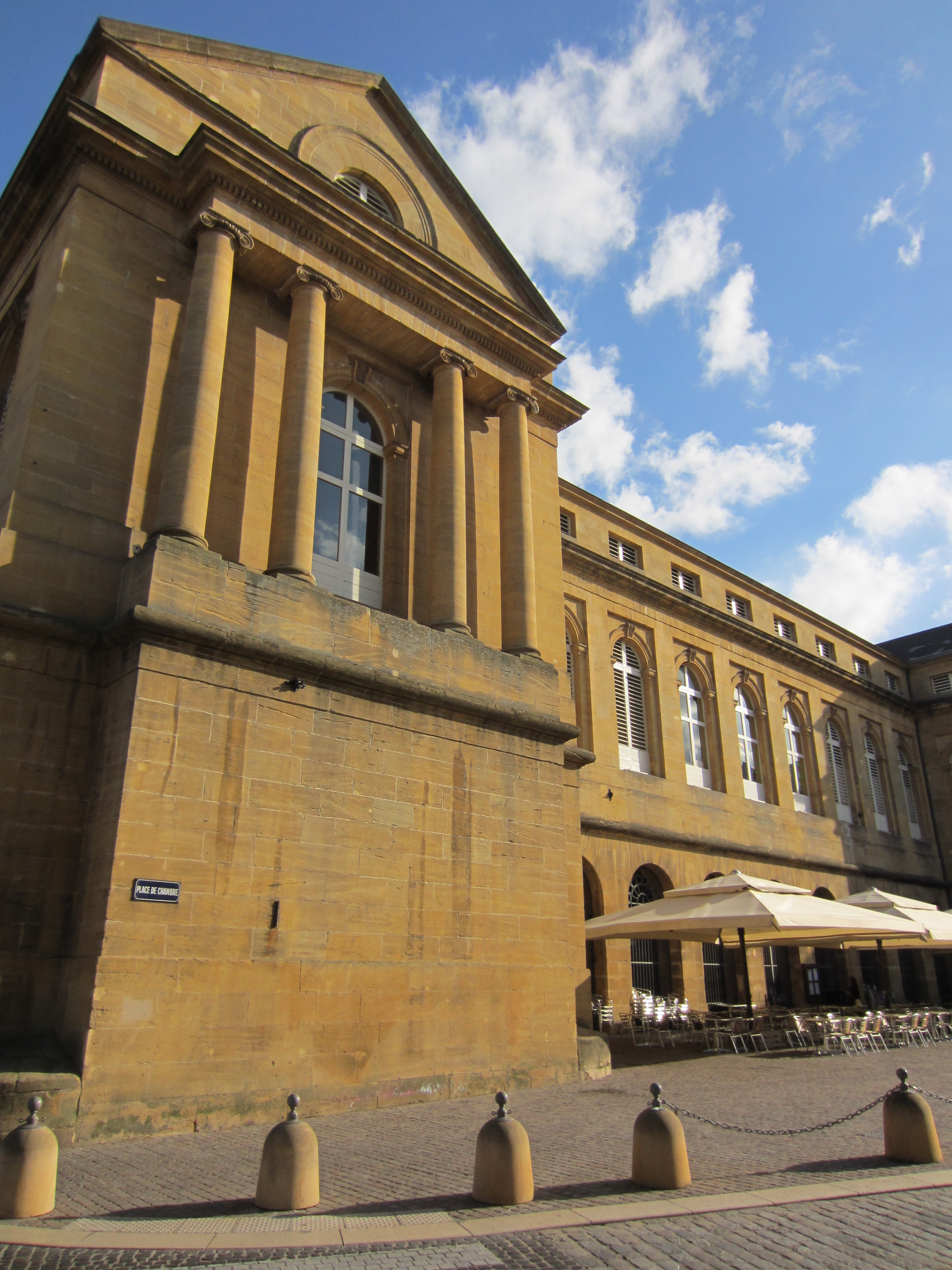
The Covered Market, home to traditional local food producers and retailers

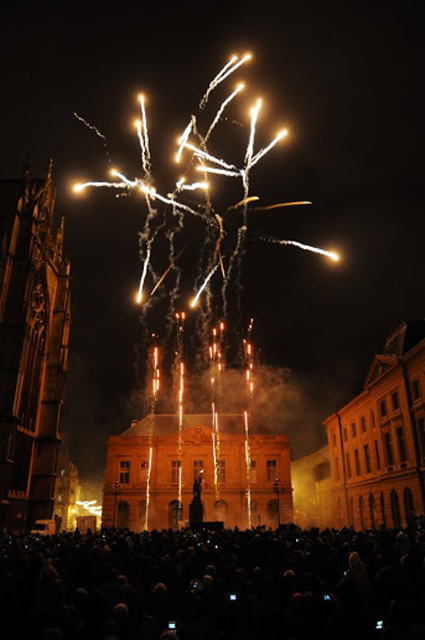
Fireworks on the town square for the celebrations of Saint Nicholas, the Lorraine's patron saint

- The Centre Pompidou-Metz is a museum of modern and contemporary arts, the largest temporary exhibition area in France outside Paris. The museum features exhibitions from the extensive collection of the Centre Pompidou, Europe's largest collection of 20th-century art.
- Saint Stephen's Cathedral is the Gothic cathedral of the city built during the 13th century. The cathedral exhibits the collection of the Bishopric of Metz, including paraments and items used in the service of the Eucharist. Metz Cathedral is sometimes nicknamed the Good Lord's Lantern (French: la Lanterne du Bon Dieu), as it has the largest expanse of stained glass windows in the world: 6,500 m^{2} (70,000 sq ft). These include works by Gothic and Renaissance master glass makers Hermann von Münster, Théobald of Lixheim and Valentin Bousch, romantic Charles-Laurent Maréchal, tachist Roger Bissière, cubist Jacques Villon and modernist Marc Chagall.
- Another of the city's churches displays a complete set of stained glass windows by French modernist Jean Cocteau.

In addition, Metz features other museums and exhibition venues, such as:

- The FRAC Lorraine, a public collection of contemporary art of the Lorraine region. It is located in the 12th-century Saint-Liver Hôtel and organizes exhibitions of local and international contemporary artists.
- The Golden Courtyard (French: la Cour d'Or), a museum dedicated to the history of Metz, divided into four sections (e.g. archeology, medieval, architecture and fine arts). The Golden Courtyard displays a rich collection of Gallo-Roman and medieval finds and the remains of the Gallo-Roman baths of Divodurum Mediomatricum, revealed by the extension works to the museums in the 1930s.
- The Museum of the 1870 War and of the Annexion in Gravelotte, a village located within the Metz-Metropole conurbation and the site of the Battle of Gravelotte, the only museum in Europe dedicated to the Franco-Prussian War. The museum exhibits military and everyday items from the period as well as artworks related to the 1870 war. A mausoleum erected in 1904 honoring the soldiers who died during the battle, the Memorial Hall (French: La Halle du Souvenir), has been included in the museum.
- The House for Europe, located on the estate of Robert Schuman in Scy-Chazelles in the Metz-Metropole conurbation, transformed into a museum and convention centre. Across the street is the fortified 12th Century church where Robert Schuman now rests. The Robert Schuman House for Europe organises cultural and educational events that introduce the visitor to Schuman's life and works and to the way Europe has been constructed and continues to develop today.
- Verlaine's House (French: la Maison de Verlaine) is a museum located in the house where the poet Paul Verlaine was born, dedicated to his work, featuring permanent and temporary exhibitions. The Solange Bertrand foundation, located in the artist's former house, conserves and displays her artworks. The municipal archives preserve and exhibit Metz's historical municipal records dating from medieval times to the present.

=== Entertainment and performing arts ===
Metz has several venues for the performing arts. The Opera House of Metz, the oldest working opera house in France, features plays, dance and lyric poetry. The Arsenal Concert Hall, dedicated to art music, is widely renowned for its excellent acoustics. The Trinitarians Club is a multimedia arts complex housed in the vaulted cellar and chapel of an ancient convent, the city's prime venue for jazz music. The Music Box (French: Boîte à Musique), familiarly known as BAM, is the concert venue dedicated to rock and electronic music. The Braun Hall and the Koltès Theater feature plays, and the city has two movie theaters specializing in Auteur cinema. The Saint-Jacques Square, surrounded by busy bars and pubs whose open-air tables fill the centre of the square.

Since 2014, the former bus garage has been converted to accommodate over thirty artists in residence, in a space where they can create and rehearse artworks and even build set decorations. The artistic complex, called Metz Network of All Cultures (French: Toutes les Cultures en Réseau à Metz) and familiarly known as TCRM-Blida, encompasses a large hall of 3,000 m^{2} (32,000 sq ft) while theater and dance companies benefit from a studio of 800 m^{2} (8,600 sq ft) with backstages.

=== Metz in the arts ===
Metz was an important cultural centre during the Carolingian Renaissance. For instance, Gregorian chant was created in Metz during the 8th century as a fusion of Gallican and ancient Roman repertory. Then called Messin Chant, it remains the oldest form of music still in use in Western Europe. The bishops of Metz, notably Saint-Chrodegang promoted its use for the Roman liturgy in Gallic lands under the favorable influence of the Carolingian monarchs. Messin chant made two major contributions to the body of chant: it fitted the chant into the ancient Greek octoechos system, and invented an innovative musical notation, using neumes to show the shape of a remembered melody. Metz was also an important centre of illumination of Carolingian manuscripts, producing such monuments of Carolingian book illumination as the Drogo Sacramentary.

The Metz School (French: École de Metz) was an art movement in Metz and the region between 1834 and 1870, centred on Charles-Laurent Maréchal. The term was originally proposed in 1845 by the poet Charles Baudelaire, who appreciated the works of the artists. They were influenced by Eugène Delacroix and inspired by the medieval heritage of Metz and its romantic surroundings. The Franco-Prussian War and the annexation of the territory by the Germans resulted in the dismantling of the movement. The main figures of the Metz School were Charles-Laurent Maréchal, Auguste Migette, Auguste Hussenot, Louis-Théodore Devilly, Christophe Fratin and Charles Pêtre. Their works include paintings, engravings, drawings, stained-glass windows and sculptures.

A festival named "passages" takes place in May. Numerous shows are presented to it.

=== Graoully dragon as symbol of the city ===
The Graoully is depicted as a fearsome dragon, vanquished by the sacred powers of Saint Clement of Metz, the first Bishop of the city. The Graoully quickly became a symbol of Metz and can be seen in numerous insignia of the city, from the 10th century on. Writers from Metz tend to present the legend as an allegory of Christianity's victory over paganism, represented by the harmful dragon.

=== Cuisine ===
Local specialties include quiche, potée Lorraine, pâté lorrain and also suckling pig. Various dishes such as jam, tart, charcuterie and fruit brandy are made from the Mirabelle and Damsons. Metz is the home of some pastries, such as Metz cheese pie and Metz Balls (French: boulet de Metz), a ganache-stuffed biscuit coated with marzipan, caramel and dark chocolate. Local beverages include Moselle wine and Amos beer. The Covered Market of Metz is one of the oldest and most grandiose in France and is home to traditional local food producers and retailers. It was originally built as the bishop's palace but the French Revolution broke out before the Bishop of Metz could move in and the citizens decided to turn it into a food market. The adjacent Chamber's Square (French: Place de la Chambre) is surrounded by numerous restaurants serving local food.

=== Celebrations and events ===
Many events are celebrated in Metz throughout the year. The city of Metz dedicates two weeks to the Mirabelle plum during the popular Mirabelle Festival held in August. During the festival, in addition to open markets selling fresh plums, mirabelle tarts and mirabelle liquor, there are live music, fireworks, parties, art exhibits, a parade with floral floats, a competition, the crowning of the Mirabelle Queen and a gala of celebration.

A literature festival is held in June. The Montgolfiades hot air balloon festival is organized in September. The second most popular Christmas Market in France is held in November and December. Finally, a Saint Nicholas parade honors the patron saint of the Lorraine region in December.

== Sport ==
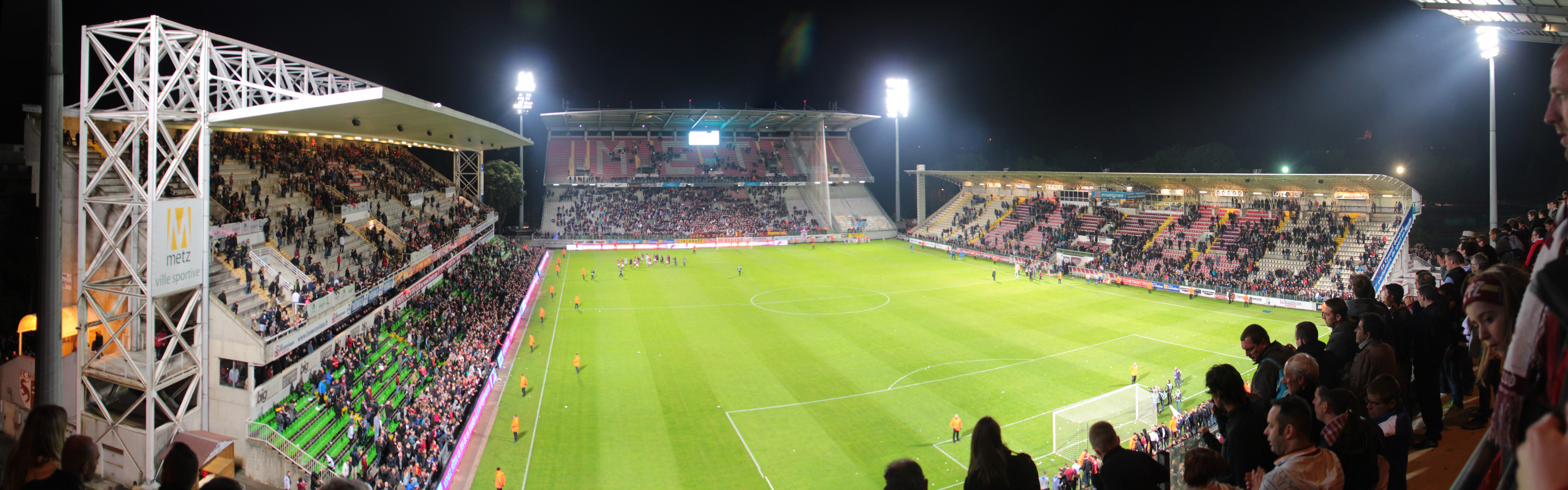
Stade Saint-Symphorien

Metz is home to the Football Club of Metz (FC Metz), a football association club in Ligue 1, the highest division of French football (as of 2019–2020 season). FC Metz has won three times the Ligue 2 (1935, 2007 and 2014), twice the Coupe de France (in 1984 and 1988) and the French League Cup (in 1986 and 1996), and was French championship runner-up in 1998. FC Metz has also gained recognition in France and Europe for its successful youth academy, winning the Gambardella Cup 3 times in 1981, 2001 and 2010. The Saint-Symphorien stadium has been the home of FC Metz since the creation of the club.

Metz Handball is a Handball club. Metz Handball has won the French Women's First League championship 23 times, the Women's France Cup nine times, and the French Women's League Cup eight times. The Metz Arena has been the home of Metz Handball since 2002.

Since 2003, Metz has been home to the Moselle Open, an ATP World Tour 250 tournament played on indoor hard courts, which usually takes place in September.

Club	Event	Sport	Leagues and Cups	Stadium
FC Metz		Association football	Ligue 1, French Cup, French League Cup	Saint-Symphorien stadium
Metz Handball		Handball	French Women's First League, EHF Women's Champions League	Metz Arena
Metz Hockey Club		Ice hockey	French Men's Second League	Saint-Symphorien Ice Ring
Metz Ronde Pétanque		Pétanque	French Championship, European Cup	Saint-Symphorien Arena
Metz TT		Table Tennis	French Women's Pro A; French Men's Pro B	Saint-Symphorien Arena
	Moselle Open	Tennis	ATP World Tour 250 tournament	Metz Arena
	Golden Mirabelle Open	Golf	Allianz Golf Tour	Technopole Golf Course
	Mirabelle Metz Marathon	Athletics		Metz Urban Agglomeration

== Education ==
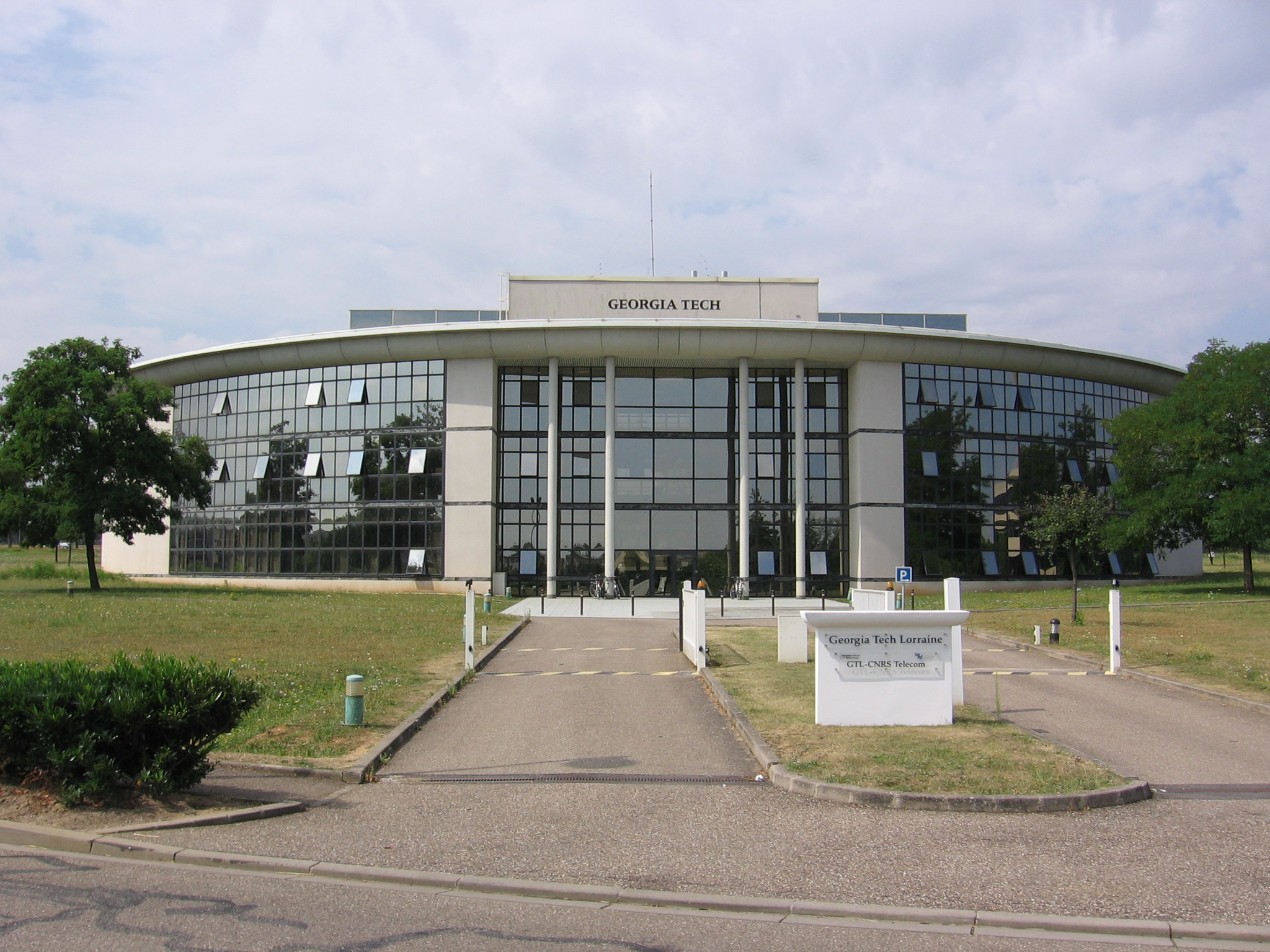
Georgia Tech Lorraine campus.

=== High schools ===
Metz has numerous high schools, including the Fabert High School and the Lycée of Communication. Some of these institutions offer higher education courses such as classes préparatoires (undergraduate school) or BTS (technician certificate).

=== University of Lorraine ===
Metz is also home to the University of Lorraine (often abbreviated as UL). The university is divided into two university centers, one in Metz (material sciences, technology and management) and one in Nancy (biological sciences, health care, administration, management and law). The University of Lorraine, which ranks in 2016 among the top 15 of French universities and among the top 300 of universities in the world according to the 2016 Academic Ranking of World Universities, has a student body of over 55,000 and offers 101 accredited research centers organized in 9 research areas and 8 doctoral colleges.

=== Graduate schools ===
At the end of the 1990s, the city expanded and the Metz Science Park was created in the southern area. Along with this expansion, several graduate schools took the opportunity to establish campuses in the park. At first, facilities were grouped around the lake Symphony, like Supélec in 1985 and Georgia Tech Lorraine in 1990. In 1996, the engineering school Arts et Métiers ParisTech (ENSAM) built a research and learning center next to the golf course. This opened the way to the development of a new area, where the Franco-German university (ISFATES) and the ENIM moved in 2010. These graduate schools often cooperate with the University of Lorraine. For instance, the university and ENSAM share research teams, laboratories, equipments and doctoral programs. The École supérieure d'ingénieurs des travaux de la construction de Metz is also located in the city.

== Transport ==
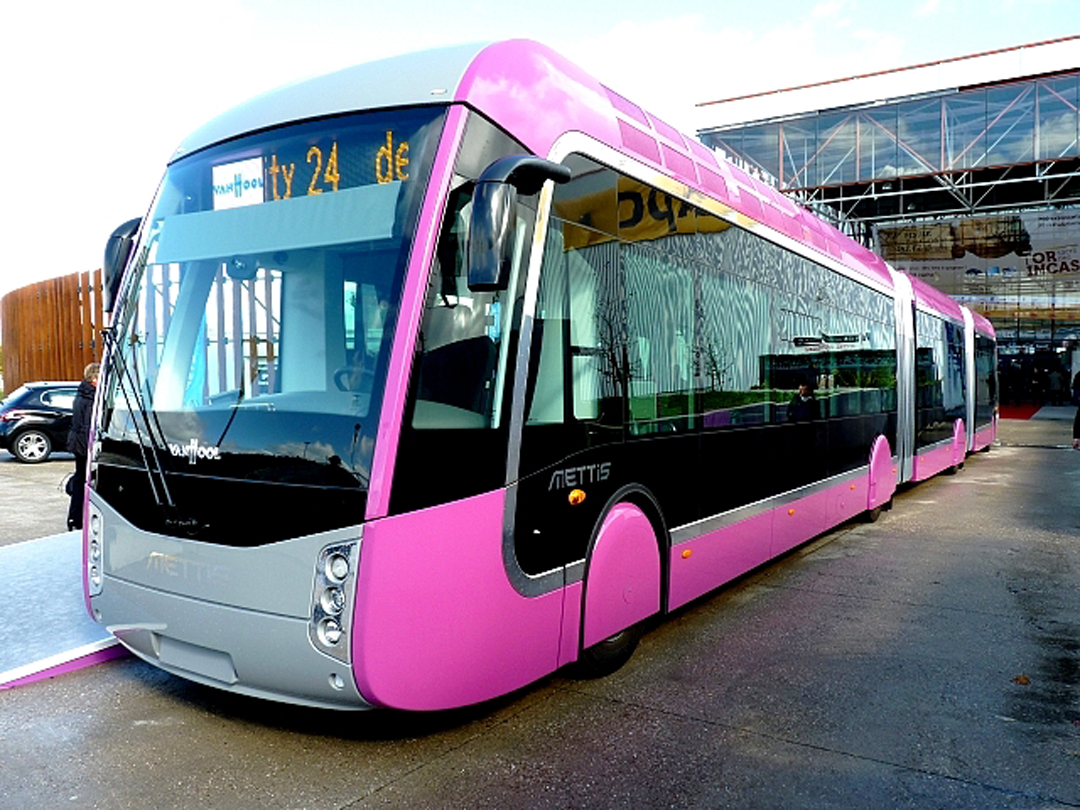
The Mettis hybrid bi-articulated bus

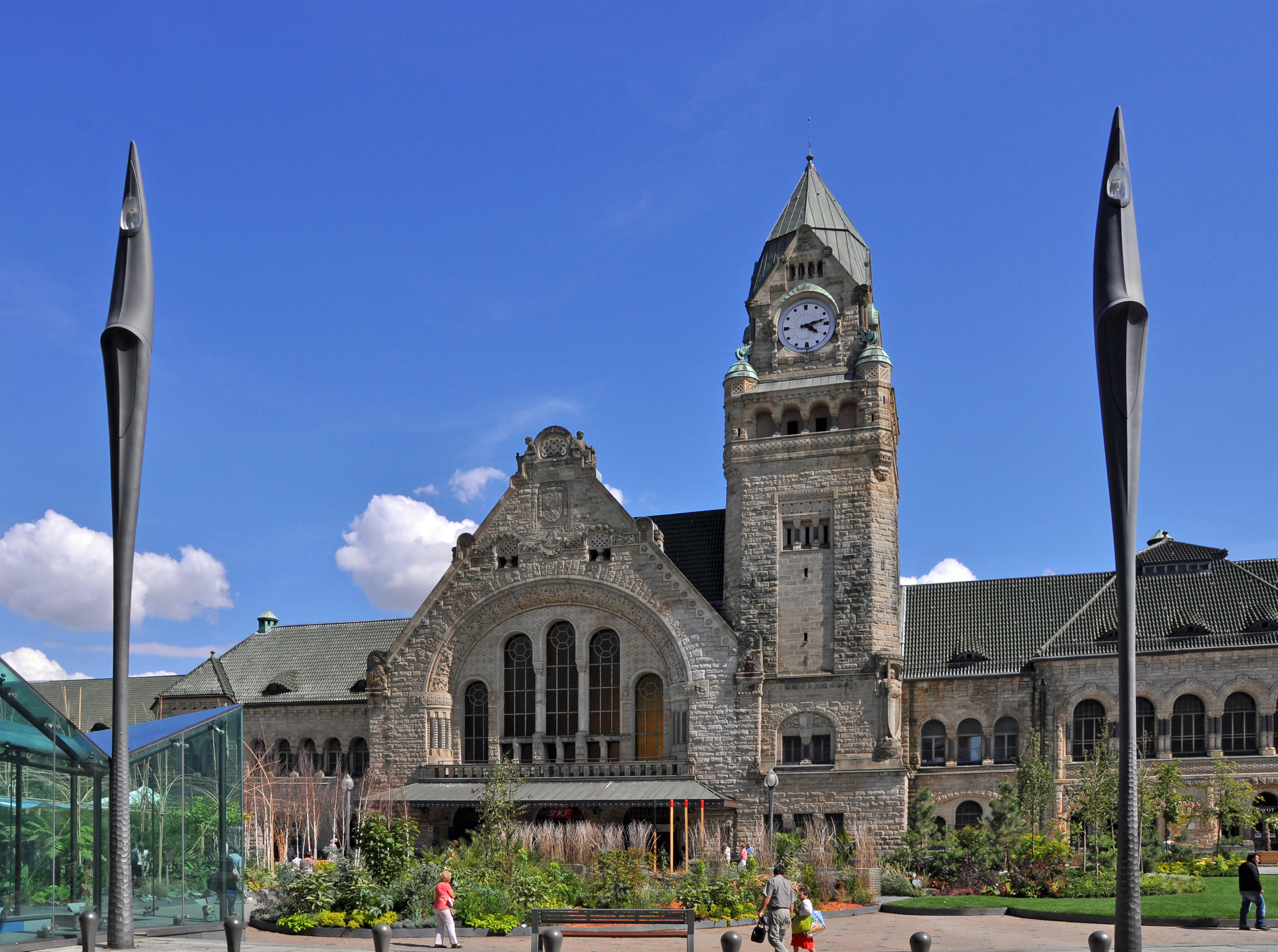
The Station Palace in the Imperial District, built 1905–1908 during German rule.

=== Local transport ===
Public transport includes a bus rapid transit system, called Mettis. Mettis vehicles are high-capacity hybrid bi-articulated buses built by Van Hool, and stop at designated elevated tubes, complete with disability access. Mettis has its own planned and integrated transportation system, which includes two dedicated lines that spread out into the Metz conurbation. Mettis lanes A and B serve the city's major facilities (e.g., city centre, university campus and hospitals), and a transport hub is located next to the railway station.

=== Railways ===
Metz Railway Station is connected to the French high speed train (TGV) network, which provides a direct rail service to Paris and Luxembourg. The time from Paris (Gare de l'Est) to Metz is 82 minutes. Additionally, Metz is served by the Lorraine TGV railway station, located at Louvigny, 25 km (16 mi) to the south of Metz, for high speed trains going to Nantes, Rennes, Lille and Bordeaux (without stopping in Paris). Also, Metz is one of the main stations of the regional express trains system, Métrolor.

=== Motorways ===
Metz is located at the intersection of two major road axes: the Eastern Motorway, itself a part of the European route E50 connecting Paris to Prague, and the A31 Motorway, which goes north to Luxembourg and south to the Mediterranean Sea towards Nancy, Dijon and Lyon.

=== Airports ===
The Luxembourg International Airport is the nearest international airport, connected to Metz by Métrolor train. The Lorraine TGV Station is 75 minutes by train from France international Charles de Gaulle Airport. Finally, Metz–Nancy–Lorraine Airport is located in Goin, 16.5 km (10.3 mi) southeast of Metz.

=== Waterways ===
Metz is located at the confluence of the Moselle and the Seille rivers, both navigable waterways. The marina connects Metz to the cities of the Moselle valley (i.e. Trier, Schengen and Koblenz) via the Moselle river.

== Main sights ==
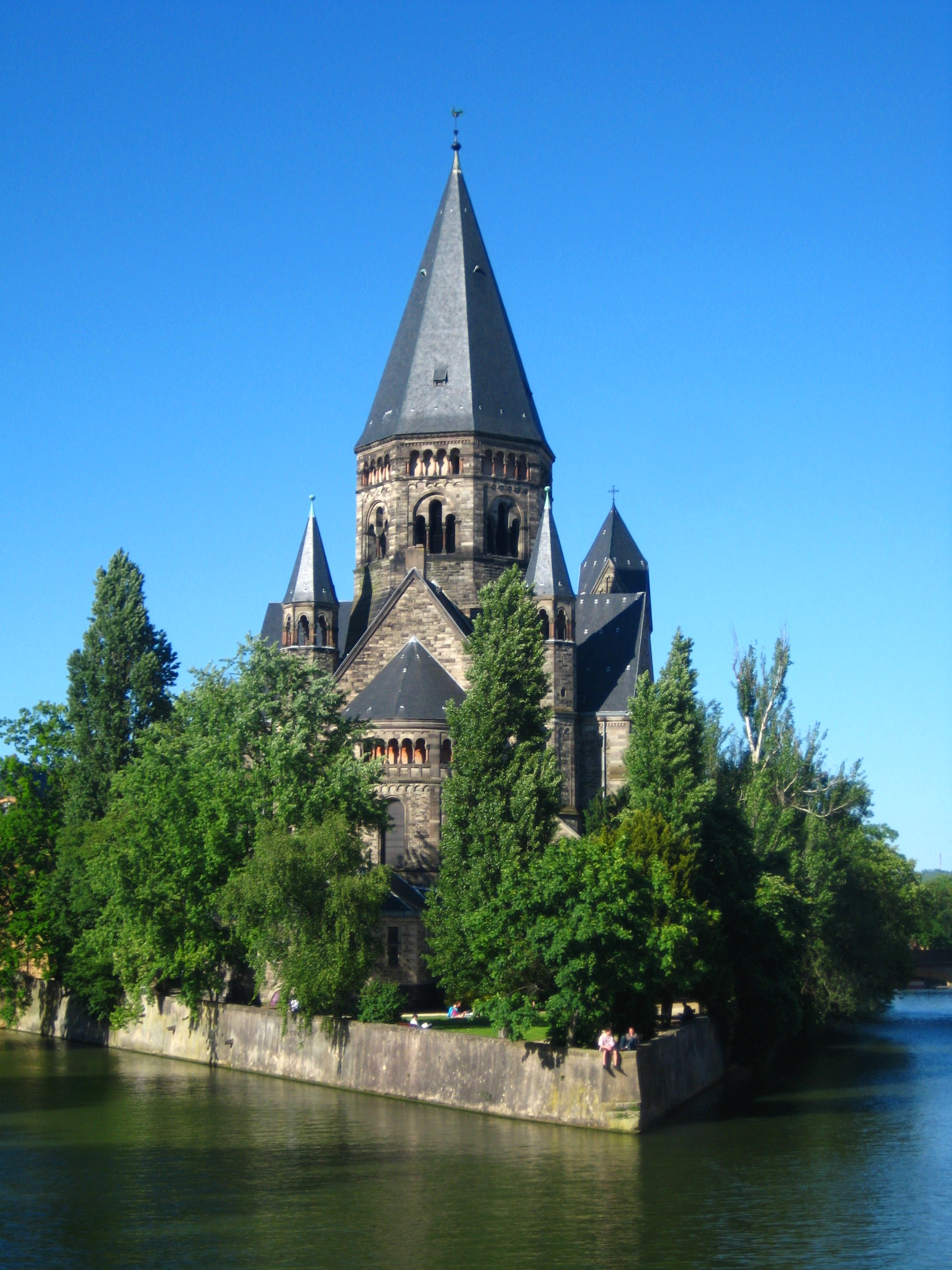
The iconic Protestant church Temple Neuf on the Moselle river

=== Religious heritage ===
- the Gothic Saint Stephen's cathedral built during the 13th century. The cathedral is nicknamed the Good Lord's Lantern (French: la Lanterne du Bon Dieu), as it has the largest expanse of stained glass windows in the world and the tenth-highest nave in the world.
- the Saint-Pierre-aux-Nonnains basilica, one of the oldest churches in the world and cradle of the Gregorian Chant.
- Saint Maximin's church featuring stained glass windows by French artist Jean Cocteau, and the Sainte-Thérèse-de-l'Enfant-Jésus church built by French architect Roger-Henri Expert.
- the 13th-century Romanesque Knights Templar's chapel, once part of the Templar commandery of Metz, the oldest Templar institution in the Holy Roman Empire.

=== Civil heritage ===
- The opera house of Metz Metropole built during the 18th century in Tuscany-influenced neo-Classical style. It is the oldest working opera house in France and one of the oldest in Europe.
- The birthplaces of Paul Verlaine, Jean-François Pilâtre de Rozier, André Schwarz-Bart, Gustave Kahn, Gabriel Pierné, the sculptor Charles Pêtre, and Antoine Charles Louis de Lasalle.
- The house of François Rabelais, when he came to Metz—then a free imperial city and a republic—to escape condemnation for heresy by the University of Paris.
- Numerous medieval edifices, including two granaries and several Hôtels.

=== Administrative heritage ===
- the town square and its surrounding Neoclassical buildings, built by French architect Jacques-François Blondel.
- the Neoclassical courthouse (former Governor's Palace), built by French artist Charles-Louis Clérisseau, location in 1775 of the Diner of Metz when Lafayette met Marquis of Ruffec and Duke of Gloucester and decided to support the American Revolutionary War.
- the Romanesque Revival Station-Palace and Central Post Office, built by German architect Jürgen Kröger.
- the Northeast France defence headquarters (former Kaiser headquarters), built by German architects Schönhals and Stolterfoth in a neo-Flemish style.

=== Military heritage ===
War memorial by Paul Niclausse (1935)

- the German's Gate from the 13th century, the last medieval bridge castle in France. The fortification played a crucial defensive role during the siege of Metz in 1552–53 by Emperor Charles V.
- the ruins of the city's defensive walls dating from ancient history to the 18th century, and the extensive 19th- and 20th-century fortifications of Metz.
- the Fort of Queuleu, also called the Hell of Queuleu (French: l'Enfer de Queuleu), used by the Germans as a detention and interrogation centre for members of the French Resistance during the Second World War.
- the war memorial, an art deco sculpture by French sculptor Paul Niclausse representing a mother cradling the dead body of her son.

== International relations ==
Metz is a member of the QuattroPole^{(FR) (DE)} union of cities, along with Luxembourg, Saarbrücken and Trier (neighbouring countries: Luxembourg, France, and Germany). Metz has a central place in the Greater Region and of the economic SaarLorLux Euroregion. Metz is also twin town with:

- Trier, Rhineland-Palatinate, Germany, from 1957
- Gloucester, England, United Kingdom, from 1967
- Karmiel, Israel, from 1984
- Saint-Denis, Réunion, France, from 1986
- Yichang, China, from 1991
- Hradec Králové, Czech Republic, from 2001
- Kansas City, United States of America, from 2003
- (Republic of the Congo) Djambala, Republic of Congo, from 2012
- Nanjing, China, from 2019
- Chernivtsi, Ukraine, from 2022

== See also ==
- Mont Saint-Quentin in Moselle Valley
