= Métrolor =

Métrolor (a contraction of "métropole" and "Lorraine") is a brand for the internal passenger train service of the Lorraine region, where the trains' frequency and network's density are comparable to rapid transit systems.

== Origins ==
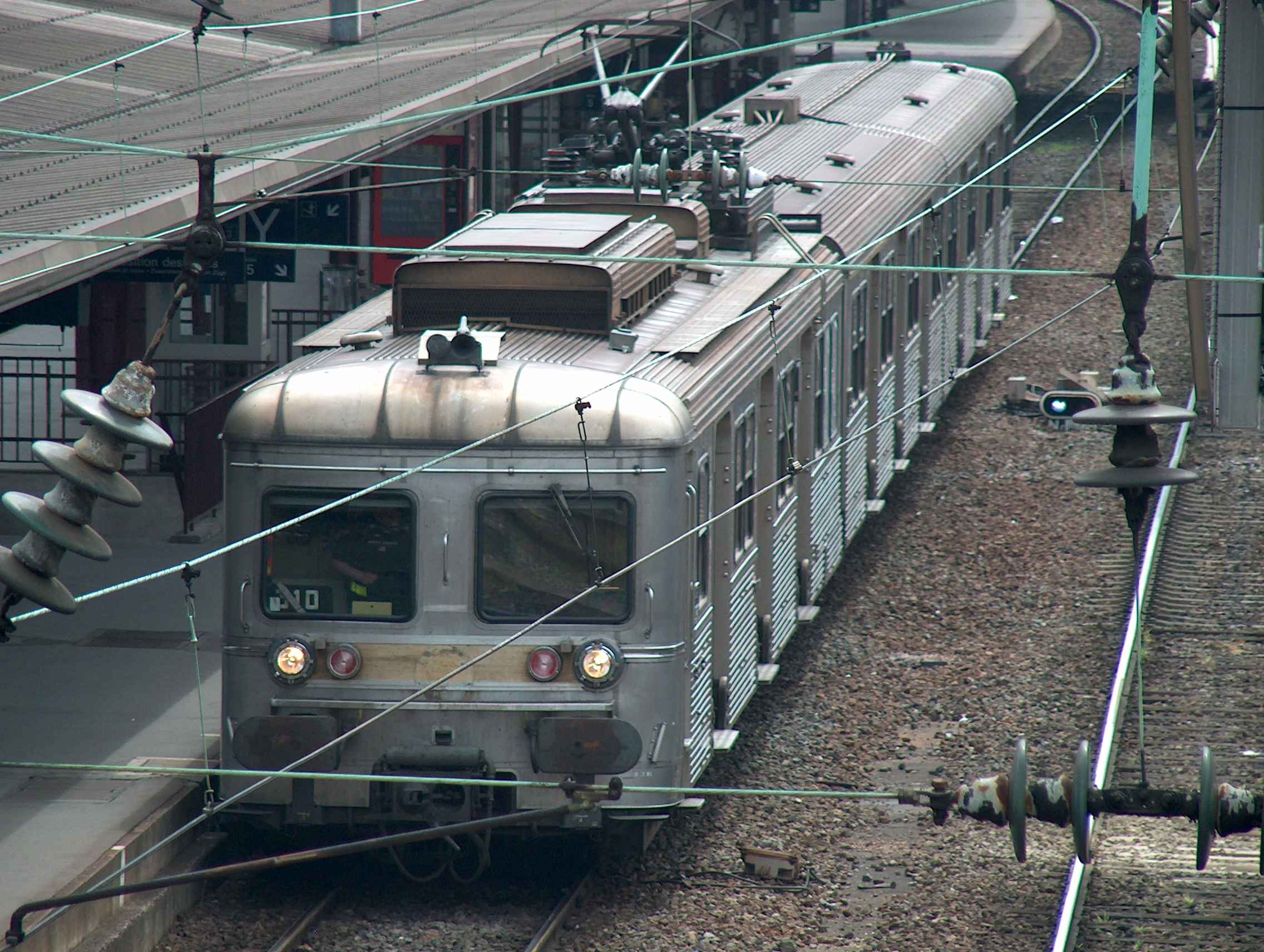
SNCF Class Z 6300 train in 2006 at Nancy

The idea of Métrolor was originally applied by Alain Scholtès to the half-hourly service on the Nancy – Metz – Thionville line, started on 2 January 1970, by contractual arrangement between the SNCF and the departments of Moselle and Meurthe-et-Moselle. It was the first such contract in France outside of Greater Paris. Over the next ten years or so, the idea was taken up by Stélyrail (1976), Métrazur, TCR (Trans collectif regionale) Région Nord-Pas-de-Calais (1978), Métralsace and others.

The first services, from 1970 to 1977, were made with SNCF Class RIB 60 rolling stock (Rame inox de banlieue, "Stainless steel suburban"), initially destined for the Paris region. Seven SNCF Class RIB 70 trains were assigned to the region permanently; these gave a more comfortable ride thanks to air suspension as opposed the mechanical suspension of the RIB 60. Six of these trains were heavily refurbished in 1990, with a shielded driver's cab in the style of multiple units and a new torque converter. These units were renamed Rame inox omnibus ("Stainless steel railbus") RIO 90.

Used in support of the SNCF Class Z 6300 class and the RIO together with the SNCF Class BB 16500, they were soon extending as far as the city of Luxembourg, although most stayed within the limits of Thionville. Duties were shared between the RRR, the SNCF Class Z2 (French and Luxembourg SNCF Class Z 11500), "Caravelles" (diesel multiple units) and, for some routes between Metz and Nancy, a Corail train and some older trains made up of UIC Type Y rolling stock.

== New definition: The Métrolor network ==
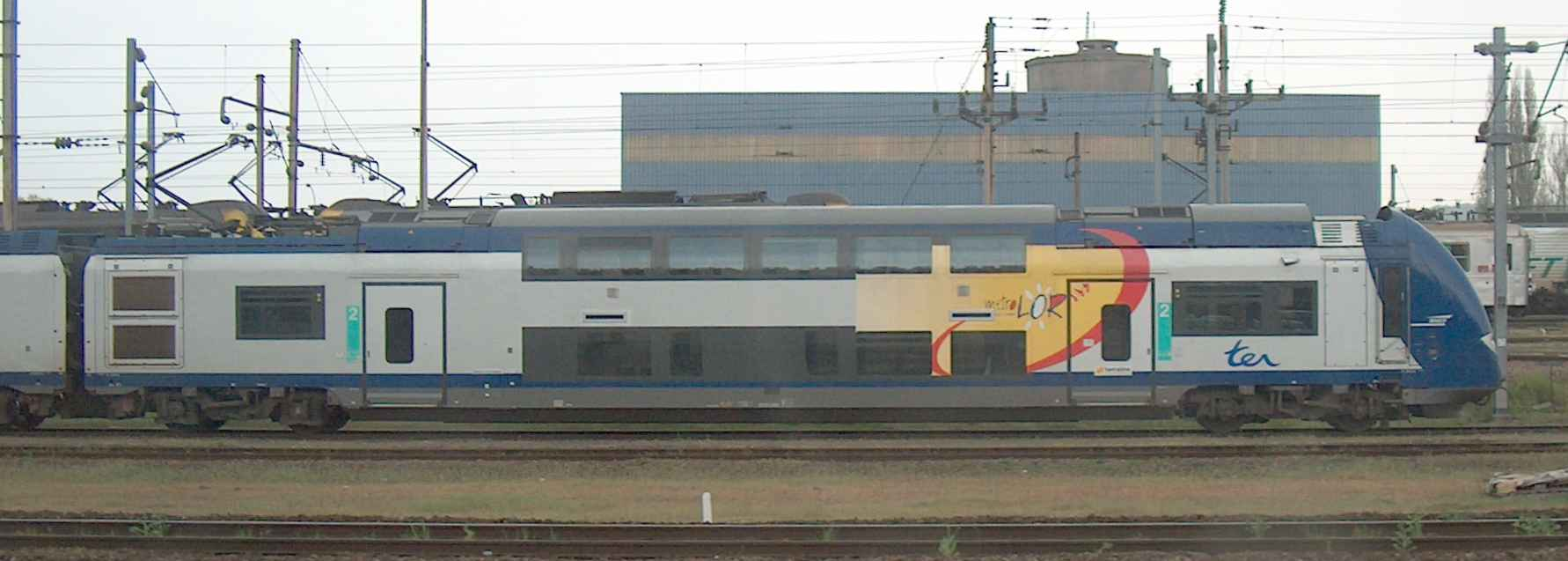
SNCF Class Z 24500 at the Thionville depot

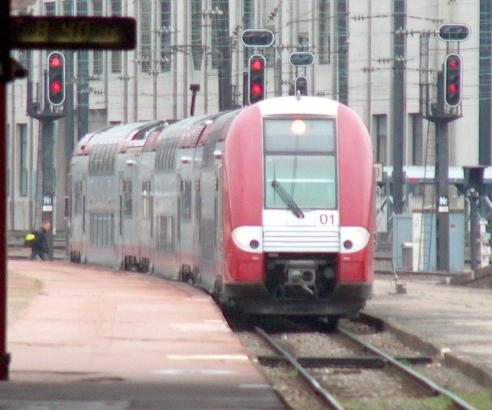
A Luxembourg train from Nancy arriving at Metz. In the background is the old sorting office, demolished in 2007

In November 2002 the name Métrolor returned to the Lorraine region to designate the regional railway services of TER Lorraine, encompassing also the cross-border services to Luxembourg and Saarbrücken. A yellow-and-red logo was designed, evoking the representative colours of the region.

== See also ==
- TER Lorraine
