= Temple Neuf, Metz =

Temple Neuf
- Neue evangelische Kirche
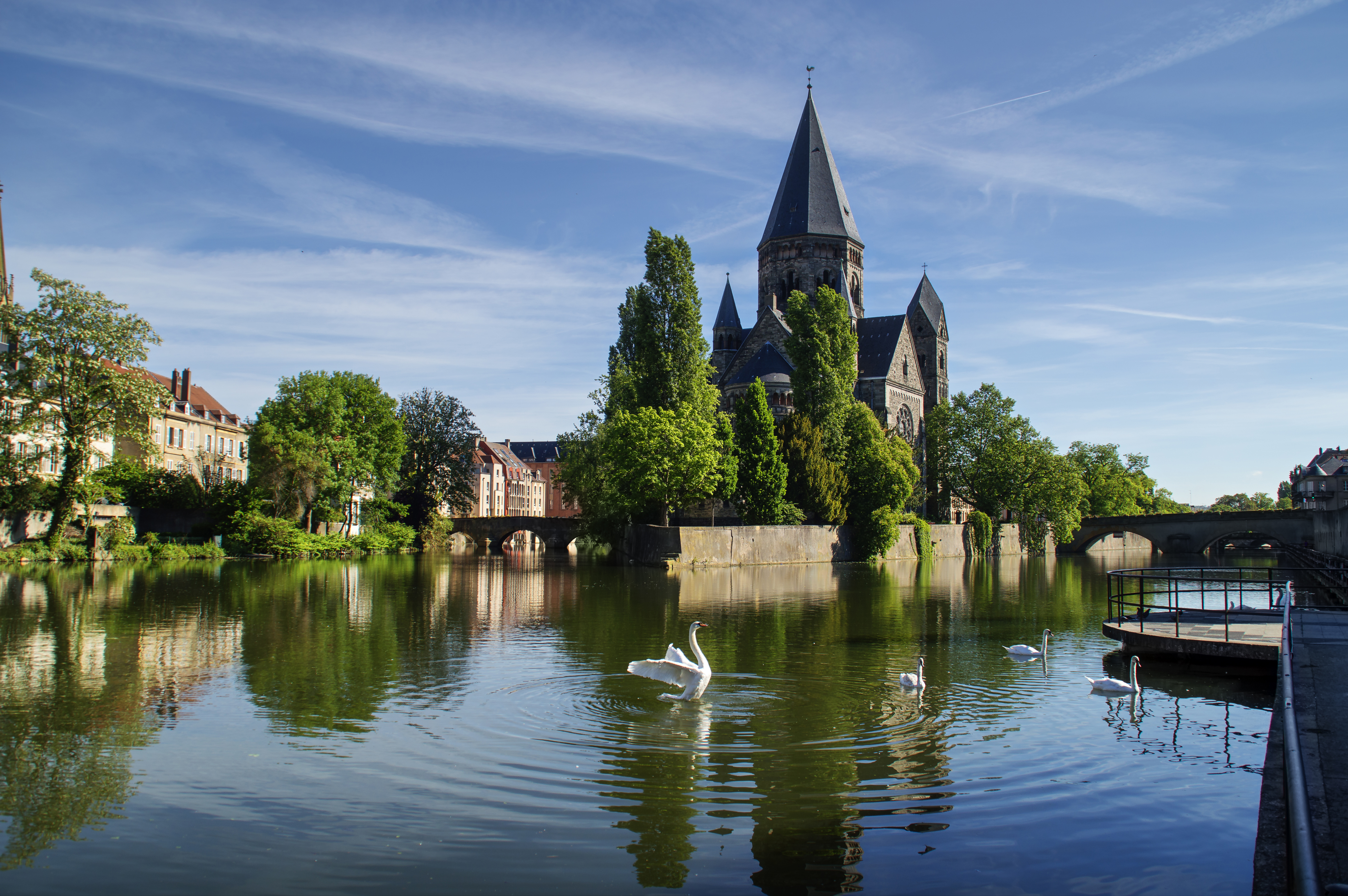
- View from rue des Roches
- Temple Neuf
- 49°07′14″N 06°10′19″E
- Location: Place de la Comédie, Metz
- Country: France
- Denomination: Protestant Reformed Church of Alsace and Lorraine

History
- Status: Active

Architecture
- Architect: Conrad Wahn
- Style: Romanesque Revival architecture
- Years built: 1901–1904

Specifications
- Capacity: 1,200
- Length: 53 metres (174 ft)
- Width: 26 metres (85 ft)

Monument historique
- Designated: 1930
- Reference no.: PA00106919

Temple Neuf (French pronunciation: [tɑ̃pl nœf], meaning "New Temple") is a Protestant church in Metz, France. It is located on place de la Comédie (next to Opéra-Théâtre), at the center of the Jardin d'Amour on the southwestern edge of Île du Petit-Saulcy, which is surrounded by the Moselle.

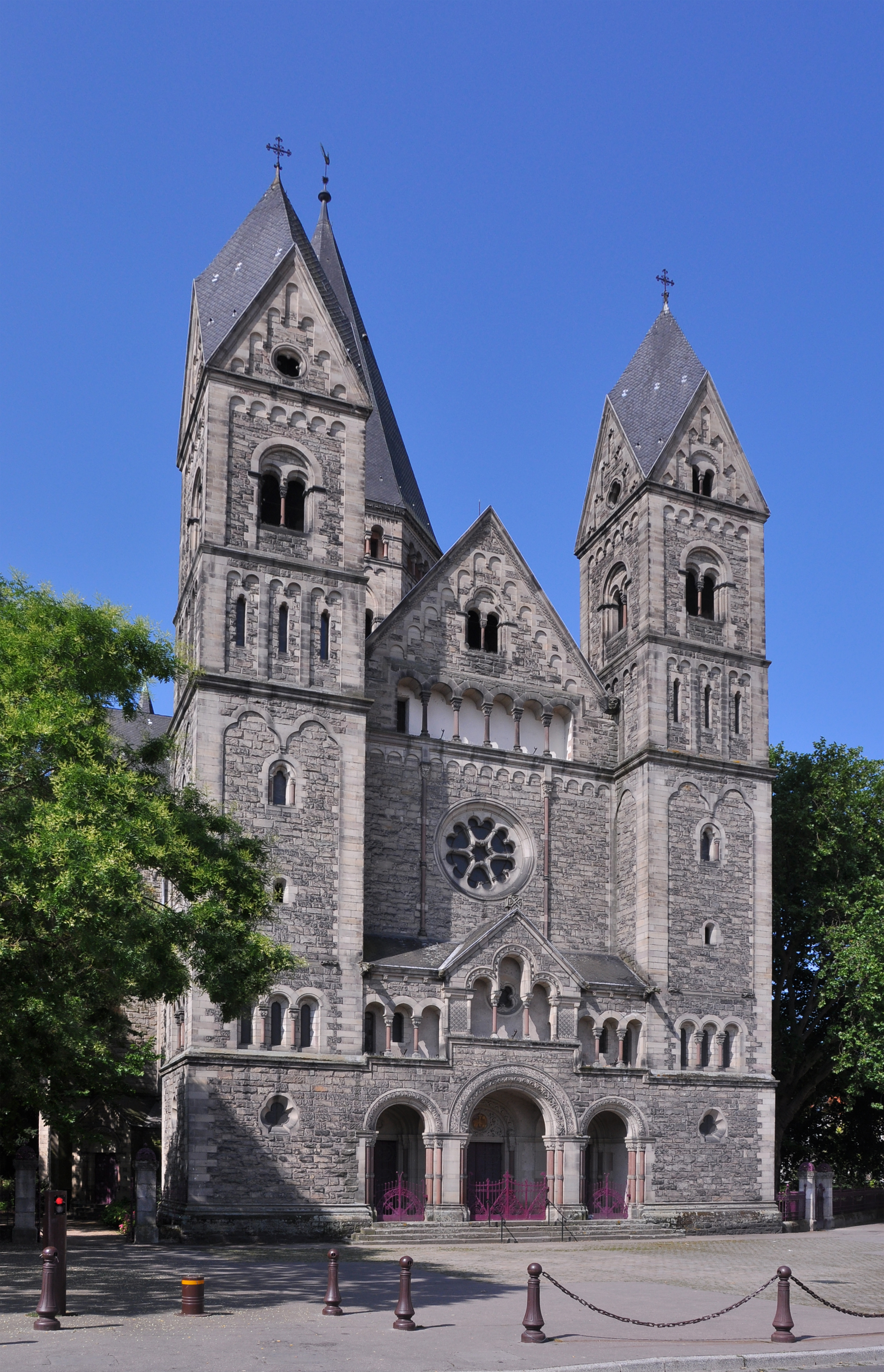
View from place de la Comédie

The church was built by Glod, with the first stone being laid on 25 November 1901 (when Metz was a part of the German Empire), following plans by architect Conrad Wahn. It was inaugurated as the Neue evangelische Kirche on 14 May 1904 in the presence of Wilhelm II, German Emperor, and his wife Augusta Victoria of Schleswig-Holstein. The church is an example of Romanesque Revival architecture, and has been a monument historique of France since 1930.
