= Pierre de Jaumont =

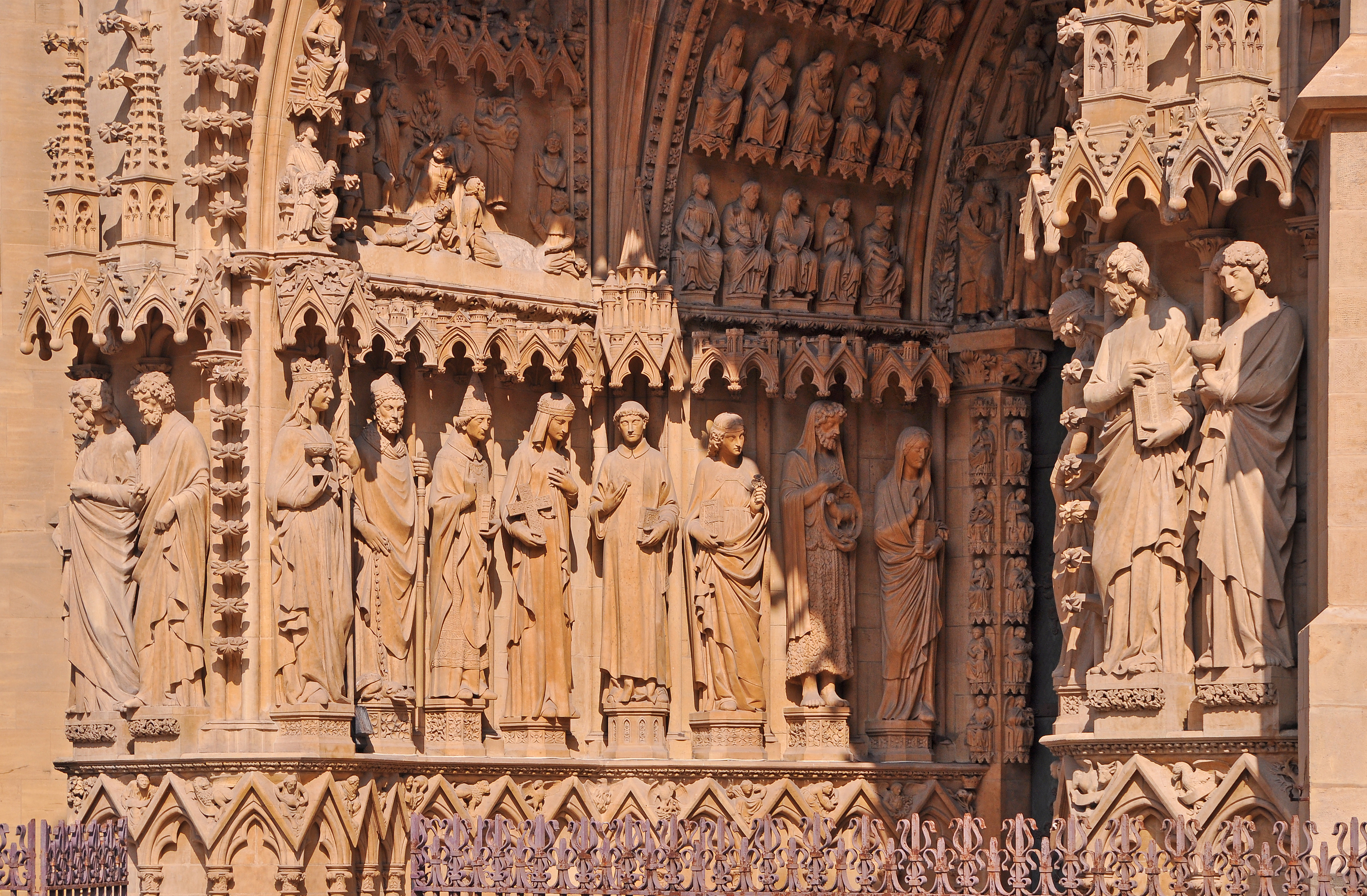
Example of use of the Jaumont yellow limestone. Here, the portal of the Saint-Stephen Cathedral in Metz.

The Pierre de Jaumont (lit. "stone of Jaumont") is an oolitic limestone of the Upper Jurassic, found in Malancourt-la-Montagne, part of the commune of Montois-la-Montagne, in Lorraine, France.

Jaumont is the shorthand for "Jaune-Montagne" i.e. the "Yellow Mountain". The stone is lovingly called "sunny stone" by locals who enjoy the cheerful sight during gray winter weather.

175 million-year-old sandstone / limestone. The yellow color comes from iron rust.
