= Timeline of Metz =

History of Metz, France, in timeline format

The following is a timeline of the history of the city of Metz, France.

== Prior to 19th century ==
- 1st–2nd C. CE – Gorze-Metz aqueduct built.
- 2nd C. CE – Roman Catholic Diocese of Metz active (approximate date).
- 407(?) – Metz is attacked by the Vandals and Alans after crossing the Rhine.
- 451 – Metz is sacked by the hordes of Attila the Hun during his campaign into Gaul.
- 6th C. - Metz becomes capital of Austrasia.
- 768 – Metz becomes part of the Carolingian Empire.
- 843 – Metz becomes part of Middle Francia.
- 863 – Religious council held in Metz.
- 1130 – Notre Dame de la Ronde church built.
- 13th C.
  - Metz becomes a free imperial city of the Holy Roman Empire.
  - Metz rampart and Porte des Allemands (gate) construction begins.
- 1220 – Templars' Chapel, Metz built.
- 1343 – Grand pont des Morts (bridge) built.
- 1356 – Diet of Metz (1356/57) held; Golden Bull issued.
- 1400 – Public clock installed (approximate date).
- 1427 – Metz Cathedral spire built.
- 1437 – Tour Camoufle (tower) construction begins.
- 1444 – Siege of Metz (1444) by forces of Charles VII of France.
- 1482 – Printing press in operation.
- 1552
  - Metz comes under French rule per Treaty of Chambord.
  - Siege of Metz (1552).
- 1560 – Magasin aux vivres de Metz (military building) constructed.
- 1561 – Porte Serpenoise (gate) demolished.
- 1564 – Metz Citadel built.
- 1613 – City customary laws published.
- 1633 – Parliament of Metz established.
- 1648 – Metz officially becomes part of France per Treaty of Westphalia.
- 1731 – Fort de Bellecroix construction begins.
- 1733 – Fort Moselle military hospital built.
- 1743 – Hôtel de l’Intendance (mansion) built.
- 1744 – Louis XV of France visits Metz.
- 1752 – Opera opens on the Place de la Comédie (Metz).
- 1757 – Académie nationale de Metz founded, as the Société Royale des Sciences et des Arts de Metz.
- 1760 – R. Samuel Hilman b. Israel Halperin (1670-1766) appointed rabbi of Jewish community in Metz.
- 1771 – Hôtel de Ville completed.
- 1777 – Metz Courthouse built.
- 1787 – Église des Trinitaires (church) built.
- 1790 – Metz becomes part of the Moselle souveraineté.
- 1793 – Population: 36,878.
- 1794 – École d'application de l'artillerie et du génie (military school) established.^{(fr)}

== 19th century ==
- 1814 – City successfully defended by the French during the Siege of Metz (1814).
- 1816 – Metz Esplanade (park) opens.
- 1821 – Population: 42,030.
- 1831 – Covered Market, Metz opens.
- 1835 – Metz Conservatory founded.
- 1844 – 30 March: Birth of Paul Verlaine.
- 1850 – Metz Synagogue built.
- 1851 – Réding-Metz railway begins operating.
- 1854 – Metz–Luxembourg railway begins operating.
- 1861 – Metz Exposition Universelle (1861) held.
- 1864 – Arsenal built.
- 1866 – Population: 54,817.
- 1868 – Brasserie Amos (brewery) founded.
- 1870
  - Fort de Plappeville and Fort de Queuleu built.
  - Siege of Metz (1870); Prussians in power.
- 1871
  - 10 May: Metz becomes part of Germany per the Treaty of Frankfurt (1871).
  - Metz becomes part of the Alsace-Lorraine imperial territory.
- 1872 – Kriegsschule Metz (military school) established.^{(fr)}
- 1877 – Lérouville-Metz railway begins operating.
- 1878 – Train station built.
- 1881 – Temple de Garnison (church) built.

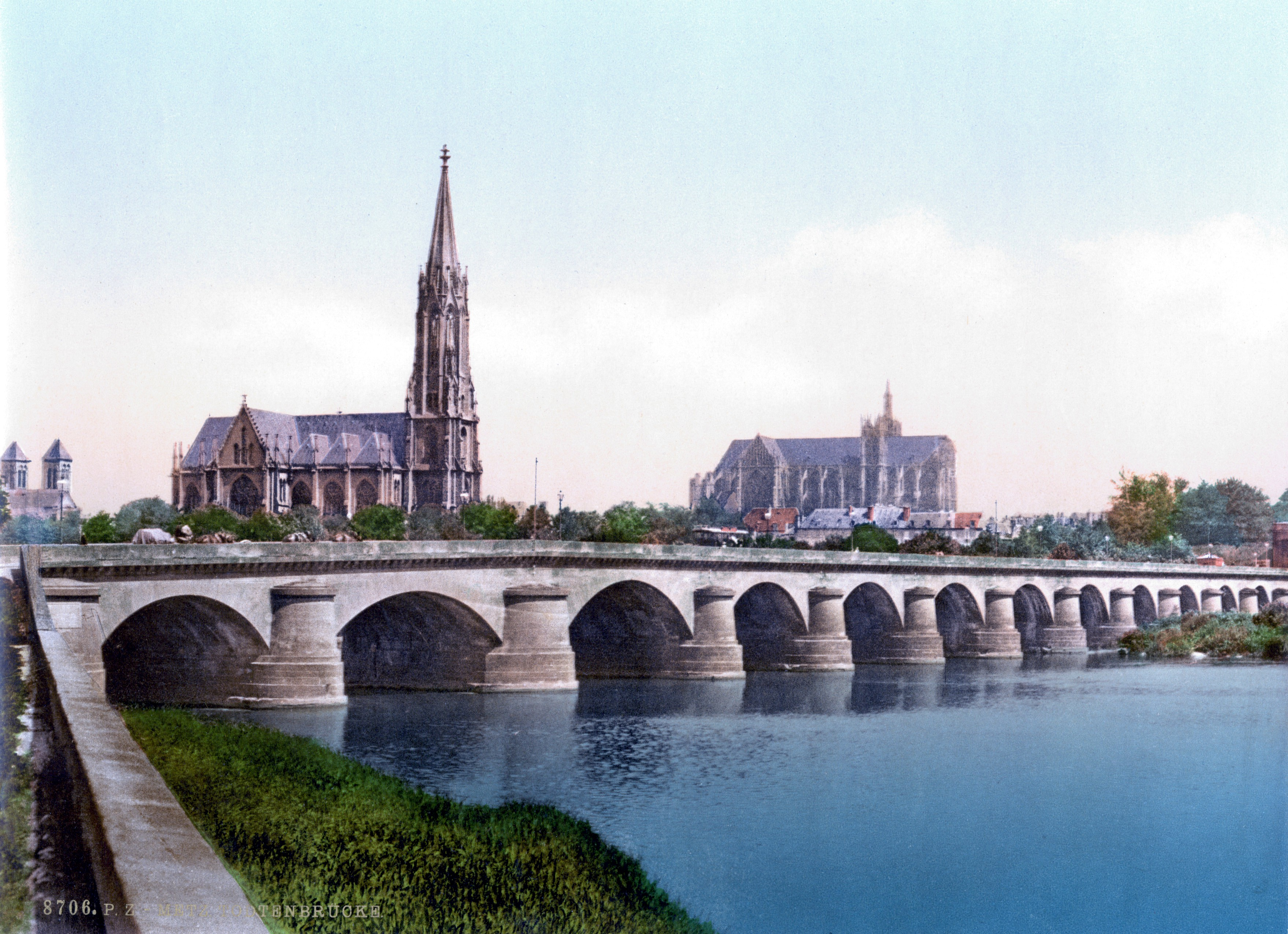
Metz at the turn of the 19th and 20th centuries

== 20th century ==
- 1901 – Metz power plant built in Pontiffroy.
- 1903
  - Porte Serpenoise (gate) rebuilt.
  - Wilhelm II, German Emperor visits Metz.
- 1905
  - Governor's Palace, Metz built.
  - Population: 60,419.
- 1906 – Plantières Queuleu becomes part of Metz.
- 1907 – Devant-les-Ponts becomes part of Metz.
- 1908 – Gare de Metz-Ville (rail station) and Feste Kaiserin (fort) built.
- 1910 – Le Sablon (Moselle) becomes part of Metz.
- 1911
  - Post office built.
  - Population: 68,598.

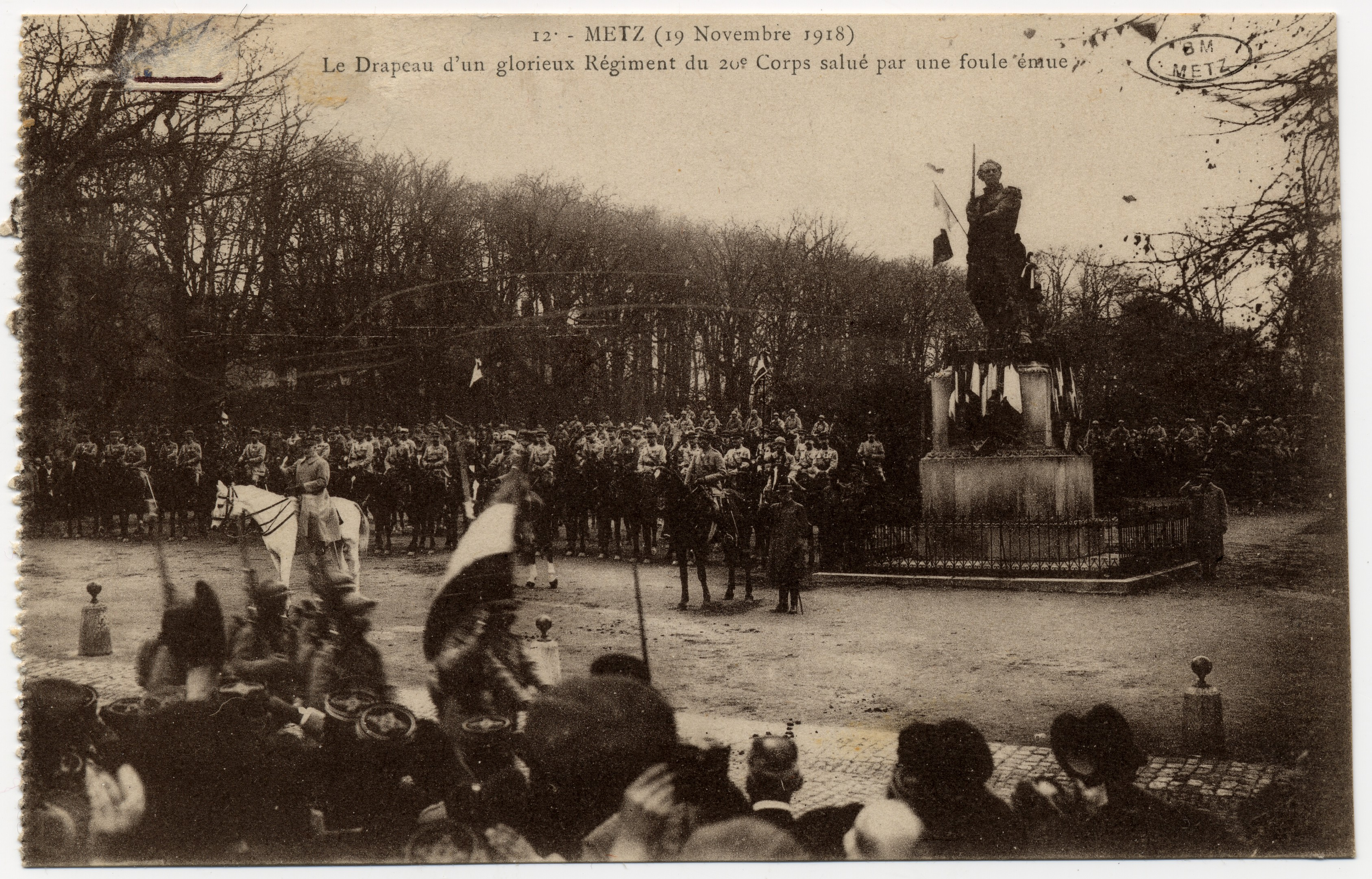
French Army in Metz in 1918

- 1918 – Metz becomes again part of France.
- 1919 – Le Républicain Lorrain newspaper begins publication.
- 1923 – Stade Saint-Symphorien (stadium) opens.
- 1932 – Football Club de Metz formed.
- 1936 – Population: 83,119.
- 1940
  - Annexation of the Moselle (1940) by Germany during World War II.
  - July: Frontstalag 212 prisoner-of-war camp for Allied POWs established by the Germans.
  - December: Frontstalag 212 POW camp dissolved. Stalag XII-E POW camp established.
- 1942 – Stalag XII-E POW camp dissolved.
- 1944
  - 27 September: Battle of Fort Driant begins near city (part of Battle of Metz).
  - 13 December: Battle of Metz ends; Germans ousted.
- 1947 - December: Flood.
- 1954 - Population: 85,701.
- 1960 – Les Trinitaires cultural venue created.
- 1961 – Borny, Magny (Moselle), and Vallières-lès-Metz become part of Metz.
- 1962 – Population: 102,771.
- 1970 – Renaissance du vieux Metz (historical society) founded.
- 1971 – Jean-Marie Rausch becomes mayor.
- 1973 – Lorraine Marathon begins.
- 1975 – Groupe Histoire et patrimoine lorrains (historical society) founded.
- 1977 – Metz library-media centre built in Pontiffroy.
- 1979 – Socialist Party national congress held in Metz.
- 1980 – Moselle Open tennis tournament begins.
- 1982 – Metz becomes part of the Lorraine region.
- 1983 – Metz Science Park opens.
- 1989 – Arsenal de Metz concert hall opens.
- 1991 – Metz–Nancy–Lorraine Airport opens.
- 1999 – Population: 123,776.

== 21st century ==
- 2002 – Arènes de Metz (arena) opens.
- 2006 – May: European Trampoline Championships, 2006 held in Metz.
- 2007 – TGV hi-speed train begins operating.
- 2008 – Dominique Gros becomes mayor.
- 2010
  - Centre Pompidou-Metz opens.
  - Metz-Mirabelle Marathon begins.
- 2011 – Population: 119,962.
- 2012 – 6 July: 2012 Tour de France cycling race passes through Metz.
- 2014 – March: Metz municipal election, 2014 held.
- 2015
  - Canton of Metz-1, 2, and 3 created per 2014 France cantonal redistricting.
  - December: Alsace-Champagne-Ardenne-Lorraine regional election, 2015 held.
- 2016 – Metz becomes part of the Grand Est region.

== See also ==
- History of Metz
- Divodurum Mediomatricorum (Roman-era settlement)
- List of mayors of Metz
- List of historic sites in Metz, France
- List of bridges in Metz
- List of religious buildings in Metz
- History of Moselle department

Other cities in the Grand Est region:

- Timeline of Mulhouse
- Timeline of Nancy, France
- Timeline of Reims
- Timeline of Strasbourg
- Timeline of Troyes

== Bibliography ==
=== in English ===
- Abraham Rees (1819), "Metz", The Cyclopaedia, London: Longman, Hurst, Rees, Orme & Brown, hdl:2027/mdp.39015054498178
- "Metz", Handbook for Travellers in France, London: John Murray, 1861
- William Henry Overall, ed. (1870). "Metz, France". Dictionary of Chronology. London: William Tegg. hdl:2027/uc2.ark:/13960/t9m32q949.
- George Henry Townsend (1877), "Metz, Germany", Manual of Dates (5th ed.), London: Frederick Warne & Co., hdl:2027/wu.89097349427
- "Metz". Chambers's Encyclopaedia. London. 1901. hdl:2027/hvd.hn52jt.
- "Metz", Jewish Encyclopedia, vol. 8, New York, 1906, hdl:2027/osu.32435029752870
- Maude, Frederic Natusch (1910). "Metz" . Encyclopædia Britannica. Vol. 18 (11th ed.). pp. 307–314.
- Benjamin Vincent (1910), "Metz", Haydn's Dictionary of Dates (25th ed.), London: Ward, Lock & Co., hdl:2027/loc.ark:/13960/t89g6g776
- "Metz", The Rhine, Baedeker's Rhine, Leipzig: Karl Baedeker, 1911, hdl:2027/hvd.hnj5e2, OCLC 21888483
- Jean Caswell; Ivan Sipkov (1977). "Metz". Coutumes of France in the Library of Congress: an Annotated Bibliography. USA: Library of Congress. hdl:2027/mdp.39015034753866. ISBN 978-0-8444-0232-1.

=== in French ===
- Jean-Baptiste-Joseph Champagnac [in French] (1839). "Metz". Manuel des dates, en forme de dictionnaire (in French). Perisse frères.
- François Michel Chabert (1855). Les croniques de la noble ville et cité de Metz (in French). Rousseau-Pallez.
- François Michel Chabert (1878). Dictionnaire topographique, historique et étymologique des rues, places, ponts, et quais de la ville de Metz (in French) (3rd ed.) – via Bibliothèque nationale de France.
- Municipale, Bibliothèque (1898). "Monographies locales: Metz". Catalogue des livres et documents imprimés du fonds lorrain de la bibliothèque municipale de Nancy (in French). (bibliography)
- "Metz". Dictionnaire Bouillet (in French) (34th ed.). Hachette. 1914. hdl:2027/mdp.39015074817142.
- "Metz". Nancy, Toul, Luneville, Metz. Guides Diamant (in French). Paris: Hachette. 1914. hdl:2027/mdp.39015069886532.

=== in German ===
- "Metz". Brockhaus' Konversations-Lexikon (in German) (14th ed.). Leipzig: Brockhaus. 1896. hdl:2027/njp.32101064064551.
- Johann Heinrich Albers (1902). Geschichte der stadt Metz (in German). G. Scriba.
- P. Krauss und E. Uetrecht, ed. (1913). "Metz". Meyers Deutscher Städteatlas [Meyer's Atlas of German Cities] (in German). Leipzig: Bibliographisches Institut.
