= Timeline of Mulhouse =

The following is a timeline of the history of the city of Mulhouse, France.

== Prior to 20th century ==
- 1273 – Mulhouse becomes an Imperial Free City of the Holy Roman Empire and receives privileges from Rudolph of Hapsburg.
- 1466 – Mulhouse "formed an alliance with the Swiss."
- 1515 – Mulhouse becomes part of the Swiss Confederacy.
- 1528 – Protestant reformation.
- 1553 – Hôtel de ville de Mulhouse (city hall) rebuilt.
- 1674 – Battle of Mulhouse.
- 1746 – Cotton manufacturing begins.
- 1798 – Mulhouse becomes part of France per treaty.
- 1800 – Population: 6,018.
- 1801 – Mulhouse becomes part of the Haut-Rhin department.
- 1826 – Société industrielle de Mulhouse founded.
- 1830 – Rhone–Rhine Canal built.
- 1836 – Population: 16,932.
- 1839 - Mulhouse-Ville station opened.
- 1849 – Synagogue de Mulhouse built.
- 1853 – Cité ouvrière (residential area for factory workers) developed.
- 1856 – Population: 45,981.
- 1857
  - Paris–Mulhouse railway begins operating.
  - Musée de dessin industriel (museum) founded.
- 1859 - Temple Saint-Étienne founded.
- 1861 – Canton of Mulhouse-Nord and Canton of Mulhouse-Sud created.
- 1864 – Musée des Beaux-Arts de Mulhouse established.
- 1866 – Population: 58,773.
- 1867 – Théâtre de la Sinne built.
- 1868 - Mulhouse Zoological and Botanical Park created.
- 1871 – Mulhouse becomes part of German Empire.
- 1874 – Musée historique de Mulhouse established.
- 1880 – Population: 68,140.
- 1882 – Mulhouse tramway (1882) begins operating.

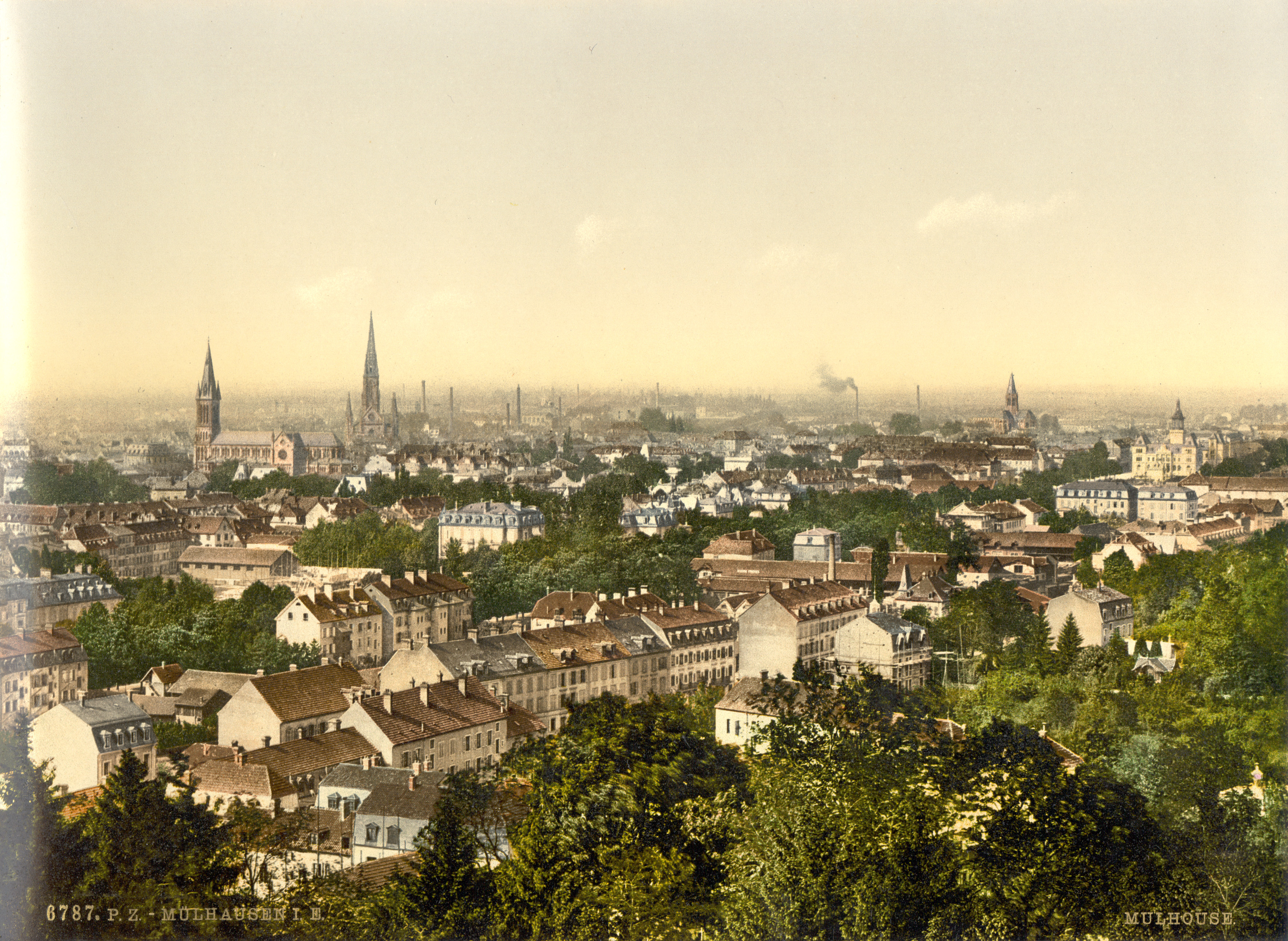
Cityscape of Mulhouse around 1900

== 20th century ==
- 1906 – Population: 94,498.
- 1914
  - 7–10 August: Battle of Mulhouse; German forces win.
  - 19 August: Battle of Dornach (1914).
  - Dornach becomes part of Mulhouse.
- 1919 – Mulhouse becomes part of France again.
- 1923 – Société d'histoire de Mulhouse (history society) founded.
- 1925 – Bains municipaux de Mulhouse built.
- 1932 – Gare de Mulhouse (train station) built.
- 1940
  - June: German occupation of city begins.
  - August: Frontstalag 213 prisoner-of-war camp for Allied POWs established by the Germans.
  - December: Frontstalag 213 POW camp dissolved. Stalag V-E POW camp established.
- 1942 – March: Stalag V-E POW camp dissolved.
- 1944 – November: German occupation of city ends.
- 1947 – Bourtzwiller becomes part of Mulhouse.
- 1955 – Musée de l'impression sur étoffes (museum) active.
- 1958 – Canton of Mulhouse-Est and Canton of Mulhouse-Ouest created.
- 1959 – 1959 Tour de France bicycle race departs from Mulhouse.
- 1962 – Population: 108,995.
- 1971
  - 1971 Tour de France bicycle race departs from Mulhouse.
  - Musée français du chemin de fer (train museum) established.
- 1972 – Regional Opéra national du Rhin established.
- 1978 - Cité de l'Automobile established.
- 1986 – Bibliothèque de l'université et de la Société industrielle de Mulhouse (library) established.
- 1989 – Jean-Marie Bockel becomes mayor.
- 1992 – Musée EDF Electropolis (museum) opens.
- 1999 – Kinepolis Mulhouse (cinema) opens.

== 21st century ==
- 2006 – Mulhouse tramway begins operating.
- 2009 – Mulhouse Alsace Agglomération (regional government) created.
- 2010
  - Tram-train Mulhouse Vallée de la Thur begins operating.
  - Jean Rottner becomes mayor.
- 2013
  - June: City hosts the 2013 Men's World Team Squash Championships.
  - Population: 112,063.
- 2015 – Cantons 1, 2, and 3 created.
- 2016 – Mulhouse becomes part of the Grand Est region.

== See also ==
- History of Mulhouse
- List of mayors of Mulhouse
- List of heritage sites in Mulhouse
- History of Alsace

Other cities in the Grand Est region:

- Timeline of Metz
- Timeline of Nancy, France
- Timeline of Reims
- Timeline of Strasbourg
- Timeline of Troyes

== Bibliography ==
in English

- "Mulhouse", Handbook for Travellers in France (8th ed.), London: John Murray, 1861
- "Mülhausen", The Rhine from Rotterdam to Constance, Leipsic: Karl Baedeker, 1882, OCLC 7416969
- "Mülhausen". Chambers's Encyclopaedia. London. 1901. hdl:2027/njp.32101065312926.
- "Mülhausen" . Encyclopædia Britannica. Vol. 18 (11th ed.). 1910. p. 960.

in other languages

- Eusèbe Girault de Saint-Fargeau [in French] (1842). "Mulhausen". Guide pittoresque: portatif et complet, du voyageur en France (in French) (3rd ed.). Paris: Firmin Didot frères.
- Sabliere (1856). Histoire de la ville Mulhouse (in French). Rissler.
- Bibliothèque impériale (1863). "Localités: Mulhouse". Catalogue de l'histoire de France (in French). Vol. 8. Paris: Firmin Didot frères. (Bibliography)
- Albert Metzger (1876). La république de Mulhausen, 717–1798 (in French).
- Martin Schall (1876). Das Arbeiter-Quartier in Mülhausen im Elsass (in German). Berlin: Kortkampf.
- Le Vieux Mulhouse; documents d'archives (in French), 1895 1895–
- "Mülhausen". Brockhaus' Konversations-Lexikon (in German). Vol. 12 (14th ed.). Leipzig: Brockhaus. 1896. hdl:2027/njp.32101064064494.
- "Mulhouse". Vosges, Lorraine, Alsace. Guides Joanne (in French). Hachette et cie. 1913. hdl:2027/uiug.30112105906736.
- Colmar, Mulhouse, Schlestadt. Guides illustrés Michelin des champs de bataille (in French). Michelin & cie. 1920. hdl:2027/uc1.b3277548.
