= Dornach (disambiguation) =

Dornach is a Swiss municipality in the canton of Solothurn.

Dornach may also refer to:

- Dornach (Mulhouse), a residential district in Mulhouse, France
- Battle of Dornach, a battle which took place near Dornach, Switzerland
- SC Dornach, a football team based in Dornach, Switzerland
- Dòrnach, the Scottish Gaelic name for Dornoch, a town in Sutherland, Scotland
