= Covered Market =

Covered Market may refer to:

- Market hall a kind of indoor market.
- Covered Market, Oxford the indoor market in central Oxford, UK.
- Covered Market, Preston
- Covered Market, Metz the indoor market in central Metz, France.
- Valletta Market
