= Timeline of Strasbourg =

Coordinates: 48.5844°N 7.7486°E

The following is a timeline of the history of the city of Strasbourg, Alsace, France.

== Ancient history ==
- 12th C. BCE – Area settled by proto-Celts.
- 3rd C. BCE – Celts develop township.
- 12 BCE – Nero Claudius Drusus establishes Argentoratum as a military fort on the western bank of the Rhine River in preparation for his planned invasion of Germania.
- 90 CE – Legio VIII Augusta stationed in Argentoratum.
- 4th C. CE – Catholic diocese of Strassburg established.
- 357 CE – Battle of Argentoratum.
- 407 CE – Vandals, Sueves, and Alans attack the city after crossing the frozen Rhine on New Year's Eve 406 AD. Sometime later that year, the city is reclaimed by the rebel forces of the usurper Constantine III.
- 451 CE – Attila the Hun takes Argentoratum during his Gallic campaign.

== Prior to 14th century ==
- 5th C. – Franks in power.
- 842 – Oaths of Strasbourg.
- 923 – City acquired by the Holy Roman Empire.
- 1230 – Saint Stephen’s Church opened
- 1250 – Ponts Couverts opened
- 1262 – Battle of Hausbergen, after which the city gains Reichsfreiheit.

== 14th–16th centuries ==
- 1307 – Monastery of Hermits of Saint William built. Gottfried von Hagenau introduces the Feast of the Immaculate Conception in Strasbourg.
- 1332 – Straßburger Revolution.
- 1348 – Bubonic plague.
- 1349 – Strasbourg massacre - Jews burned for "causing a pestilence by poisoning the wells".
- 1354 – Three Kings clock erected.
- 1362 – Fritsche Closener writes Straßburger Chronik, a history of the city.
- 1381 - City joined the Städtebund, or league of Swabian towns.
- 1414 – Sigismund, Holy Roman Emperor visits Strasbourg (7–14 July)
- 1415 – Paper mill established.
- 1427 – Kammerzell House built.
- 1439 – Strasbourg Cathedral finished.
- 1440s – Johannes Gutenberg develops printing technique.
- 1444 – Population: circa 20,000
- 1458 – Johannes Mentelin opens print shop (approximate date).
- 1464 – Heinrich Eggestein opens print shop (approximate date).
- 1466 – World's first spectacle specialist shop opened in Strasbourg.
- 1468 – World's first printed advertisement published in Strasbourg.

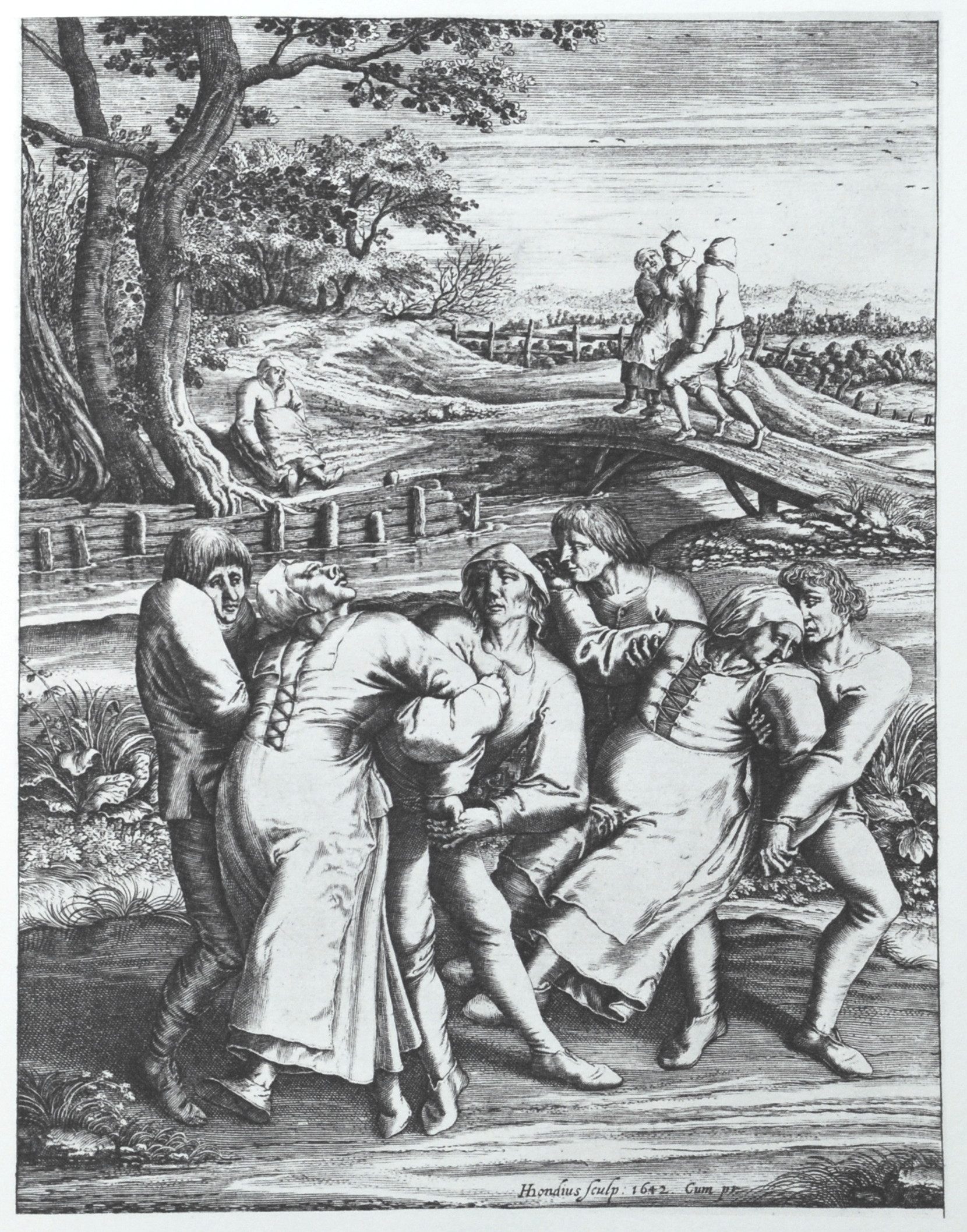
The dancing plague of 1518

- 1483 – Hans Grüninger printer in business.
- 1504 – visit by King Maximilian I to the Strasbourg cannon foundry.
- 1518 – Dancing plague.
- 1521 – St. Thomas finished.
- 1523 – Protestant Reformation (approximate date).
- 1538
  - Lutheran Gymnasium founded.
  - University of Strasbourg founded.
- 1552 – 19 September, Charles V, Holy Roman Emperor visits Strasbourg.
- 1570 – Christkindelsmärik begins.
- 1574 – Astronomical clock erected, designed by Christian Herlin.
- 1585 – Neubau inaugurated
- 1588 – Grosse Metzig built.
- 1592 – Strasbourg Bishops' War breaks out over disputed election to the bishopric

== 17th–18th centuries ==
- 1605 – Relation aller Fürnemmen und gedenckwürdigen Historien newspaper in publication.
- 1619 – Jardin botanique de l'Université de Strasbourg established.
- 1681 – City annexed by Louis XIV of France.
- 1684 – Citadel built.
- 1690 – Barrage Vauban opened.
- 1697 – French annexation recognised by the Holy Roman Empire.
- 1701 – Opera house opens.
- 1725 – New Hospital completed
- 1728 – World's first school for midwives opened in Strasbourg
- 1732 – Episcopal Palace inaugurated.

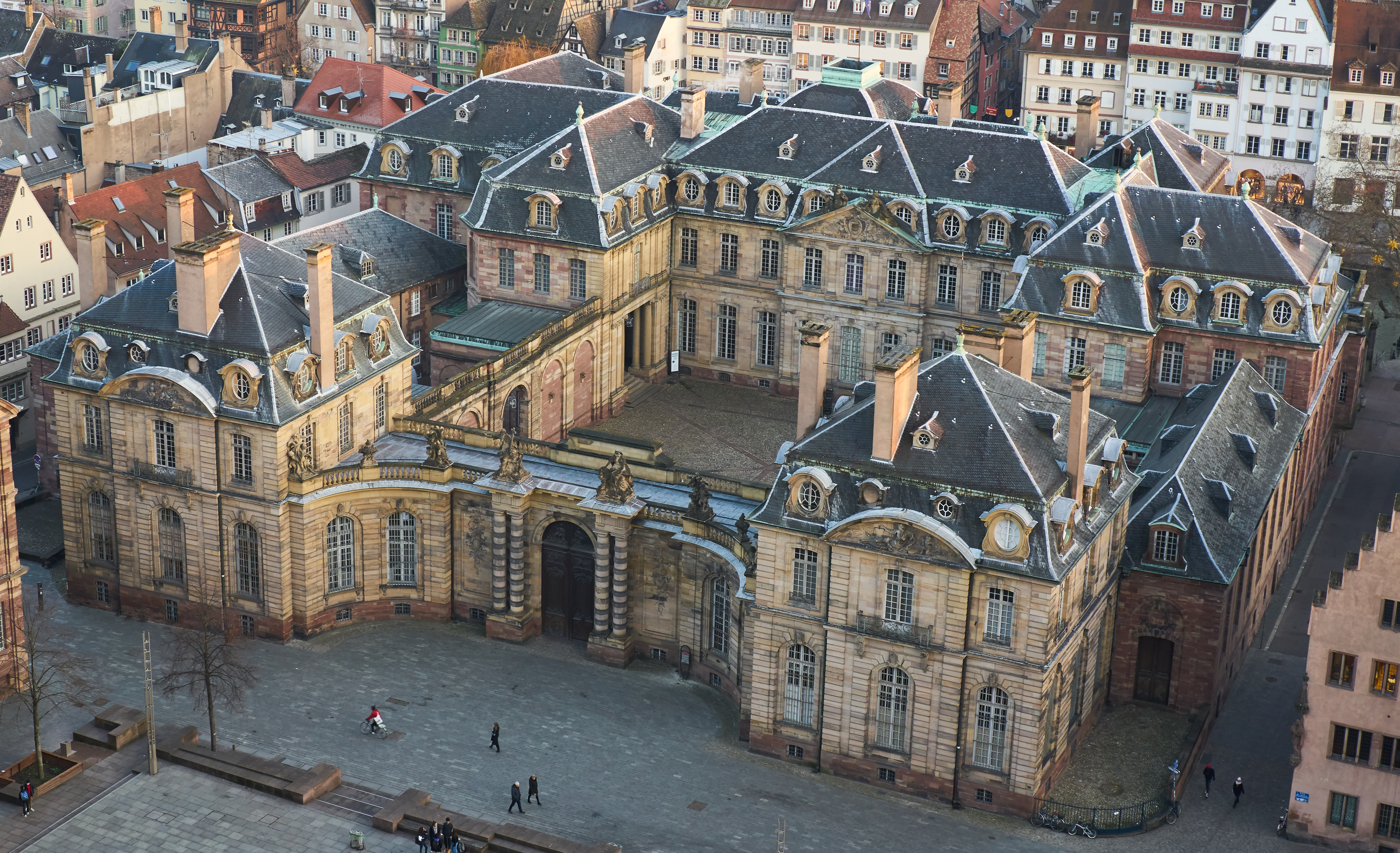
Palais Rohan

- 1736
  - Hôtel de Hanau built.
  - Hôtel de Klinglin built.
- 1742
  - Palais Rohan inaugurated.
  - Place Broglie laid out.
- 1755 – Hôtel Gayot built
- 1765 - Saint Aurelia's Church re-inaugurated.
- 1770 – Marie-Antoinette in Strasbourg.
- 1771 – Goethe in Strasbourg.
- 1778 – Mozart in Strasbourg (10 October - 3 November). He meets with Franz Xaver Richter, Johann Andreas Silbermann, Johann Baptist Wendling, Maximilian of Zweibrücken, and others.
- 1772 – Place Kléber built.
- 1790 – City becomes part of the Bas-Rhin souveraineté.
- 1792
  - "La Marseillaise" composed by Rouget de Lisle.
  - University closed.
- 1793 – Population: 47,254.

== 19th century ==
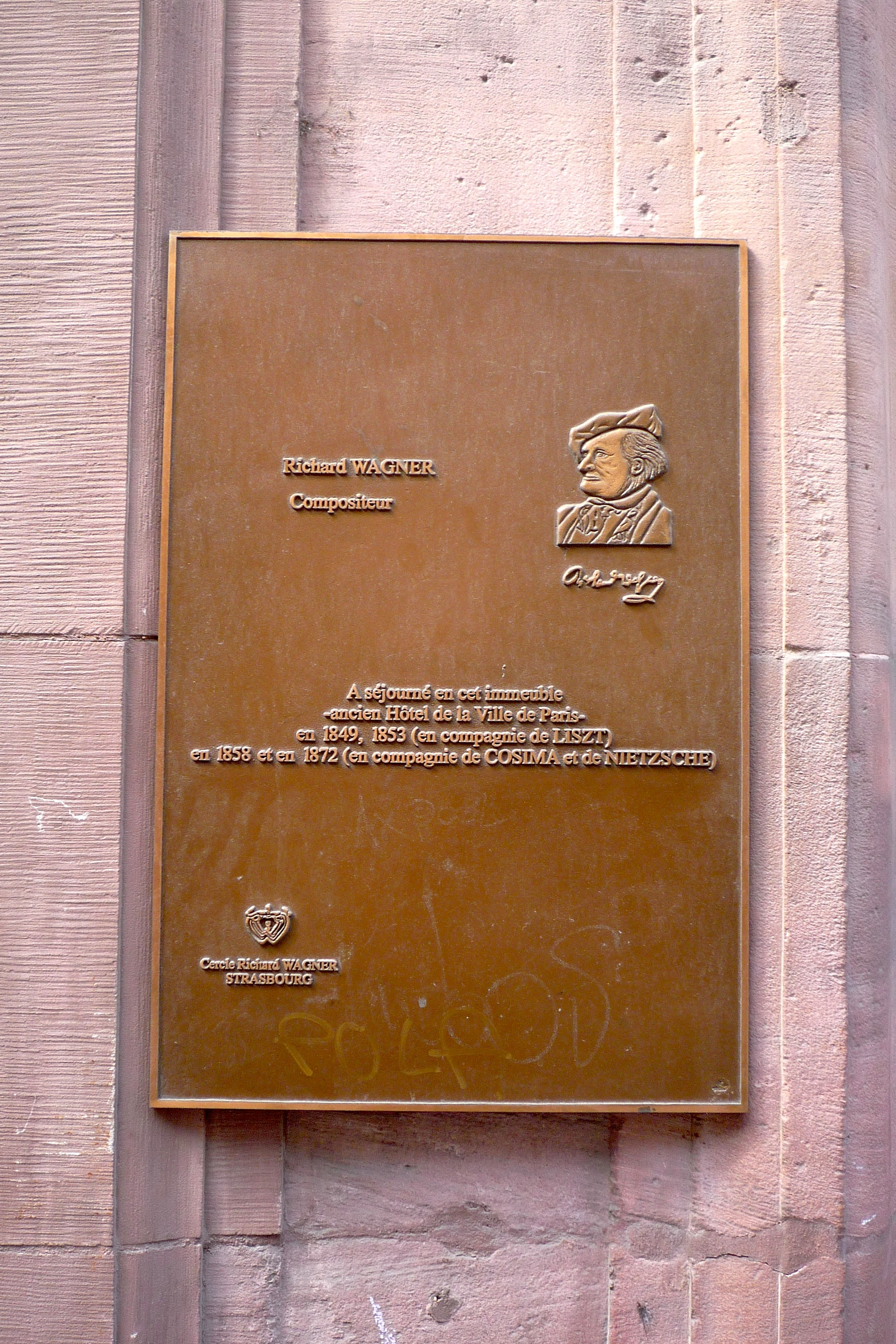
The Wagner-Liszt-Cosima-Nietzsche plaque.

- 1801 – Musée des Beaux-Arts de Strasbourg collection founded.
- 1805 – Napoleon in Strasbourg (also in 1806 and 1809).
- 1821 – Théâtre Municipal opens.
- 1823 – 5 December: Franz Liszt, aged 12, gives his first concert on French soil.
- 1831 – Georg Büchner in Strasbourg (until 1833)
- 1832 – Société des Amis des arts founded.
- 1836 – Louis-Napoleon Bonaparte in Strasbourg
- 1843 – Astronomical clock erected, designed by Jean-Baptiste Schwilgué.
- 1846 – Gare de Strasbourg opens.
- 1849 – Richard Wagner in Strasbourg (also in 1853 [with Liszt], 1858, and 1872 [with Cosima, and Nietzsche]).
- 1853 – Marne–Rhine Canal opens.
- 1855 – Orchestra and Société pour la conservation des monuments historiques d'Alsace founded.
- 1861 – Rhine Bridge, Kehl built.
- 1862 - Association philomathique d'Alsace et de Lorraine founded.
- 1870 – Siege of Strasbourg; art museum and city library destroyed.
- 1871 – City becomes capital city of Reichsland Elsaß-Lothringen, German Empire.
- 1872
  - Bibliothek established.
  - University reopens as Kaiser-Wilhelms-Universität.
  - Verlag Karl J. Trübner (publisher) in business.
  - Population: 85,654.
- 1873 – Théâtre Municipal rebuilt.
- 1874 – Fort Rapp and other fortifications built.
- 1877 – Elsäßische Neueste Nachrichten begins publication.
- 1878
  - Stele of Caius Largennius is discovered
  - Strasbourg tramway (horse drawn) founded.
- 1880
  - Place de la République construction begins.
  - Population: 104,471.
- 1881 – Observatory inaugurated.
- 1883
  - Kunstgewerbe Museum founded.
  - Strasbourg-Ville station rebuilt.
- 1884 – Palais Universitaire built.
- 1889 – Kaiserpalast inaugurated.
- 1890 – Hohenlohe-Museum, Cabinet des estampes et des dessins collection, and Fussball Klub Straßburg founded.
- 1891 – Population: 123,500.
- 1893 – Musée zoologique de la ville de Strasbourg building constructed.
- 1894 - Strasbourg tramway electrified.
- 1897 – St. Paul's Church built.
- 1898
  - Palais de Justice built.
  - Synagogue du Quai Kléber built.
- 1900
  - FC Frankonia 1900 Straßburg (football club) formed.
  - Population: 150,268.

== 20th century ==
- 1901 – Saint-Pierre-le-Jeune Protestant Church restored.
- 1903 – Sängerhaus inaugurated
- 1904
  - Hôtel Brion built.
  - Sainte-Madeleine Church destroyed by fire.
- 1905 – Population: 167,678.
  - Gustav Mahler, Richard Strauss and Romain Rolland in Strasbourg for the First Alsatian Music Festival (Premier Festival Alsacien de Musique)
- 1906 – Fußball Club Neudorf founded.
- 1907
  - Musée alsacien opens.
  - Sainte-Madeleine Church rebuilt.
- 1911 – Population: 178,891.
- 1914 – Stade de la Meinau opens.

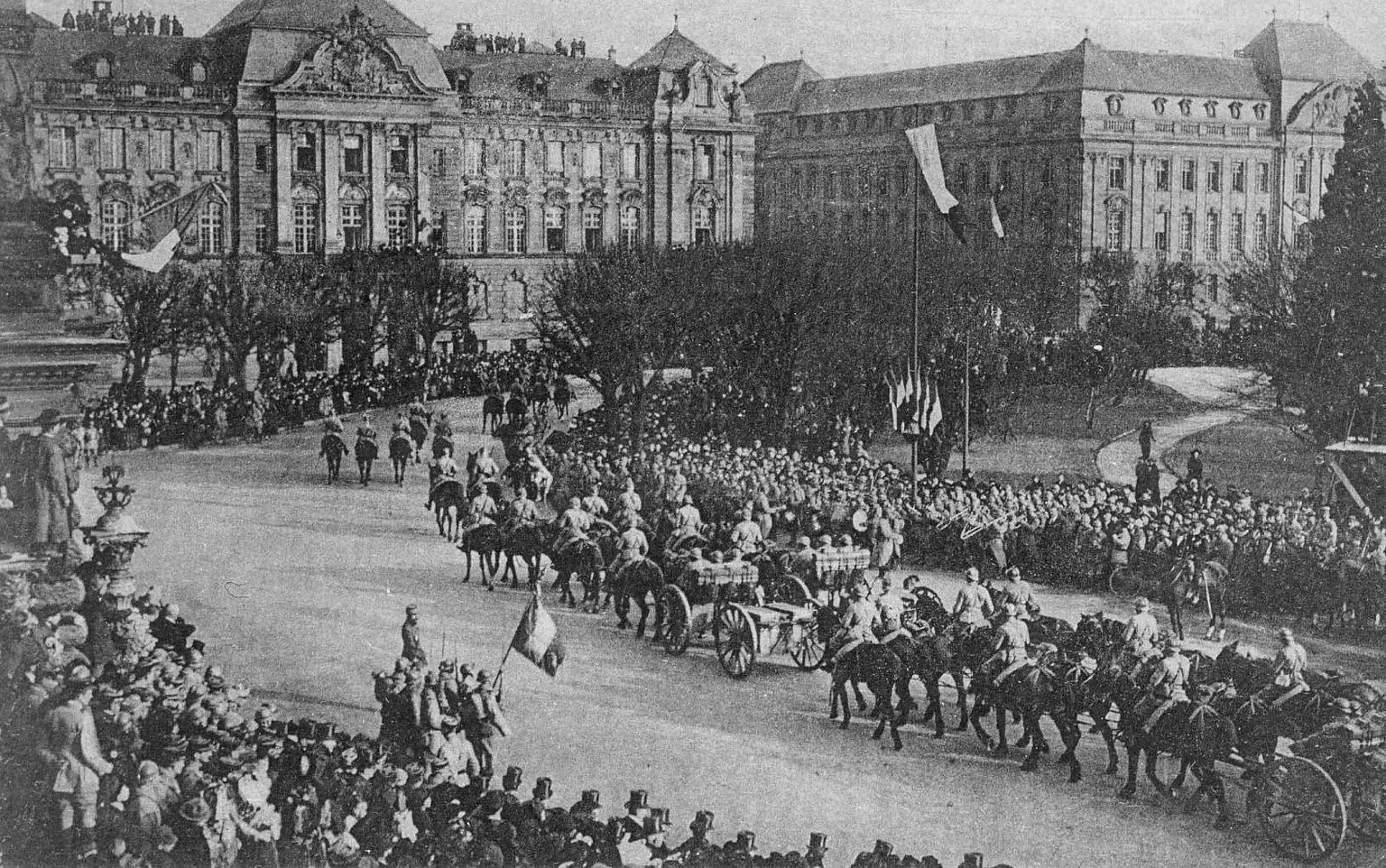
French Army in Strasbourg in 1918

- 1918 – Alsace returns to France.
- 1919 – Institut Européen d'Etudes Commerciales Supérieures de Strasbourg established.
- 1920
  - Musée historique de Strasbourg founded.
  - City designated headquarters of Central Commission for Navigation on the Rhine.
- 1928
  - Aubette redecorated.
  - Strasbourg Illkirch Graffenstaden Basket formed.
- 1931
  - Musée de l'Œuvre Notre-Dame founded.
  - Population: 181,465.
- 1935
  - Strasbourg Airport opens.
  - 8–10 June: first "International Olympics of Workers' Music and Songs" (I. Internationale Arbeiter-Musik- und Gesangs-Olympiade), featuring Hanns Eisler, and Ernst Busch.
- 1938 – City co-hosts the 1938 FIFA World Cup.
- 1940
  - Alsace occupied and annexed to Germany. Adolf Hitler visits Strasbourg.
  - July: Frontstalag 210 prisoner-of-war camp established by the Germans.
  - November: Frontstalag 210 POW camp dissolved.
  - November: Stalag V-D POW camp established by the Germans.
- 1941 – Reichsuniversität Straßburg formed.
- 1942 – Stalag V-D POW camp dissolved.
- 1944
  - 23 November: City liberated from Germans.
  - 27 November: Charles Frey becomes mayor.
- 1945 – Institut d'études politiques de Strasbourg established.
- 1947 – Parts of the municipal art collections destroyed by accidental fire in Palais Rohan.
- 1949 – Council of Europe headquartered in Strasbourg.
- 1954
  - Amis du vieux Strasbourg (historical society) founded.
  - Population: 200,921.
- 1959
  - Pierre Pflimlin becomes mayor.
  - City designated headquarters of European Court of Human Rights.
- 1960 - Strasbourg tramway closed.
- 1965 – City designated Seat of the European Parliament.
- 1963 – La belle Strasbourgeoise bought, then the costliest painting ever purchased by a French museum.

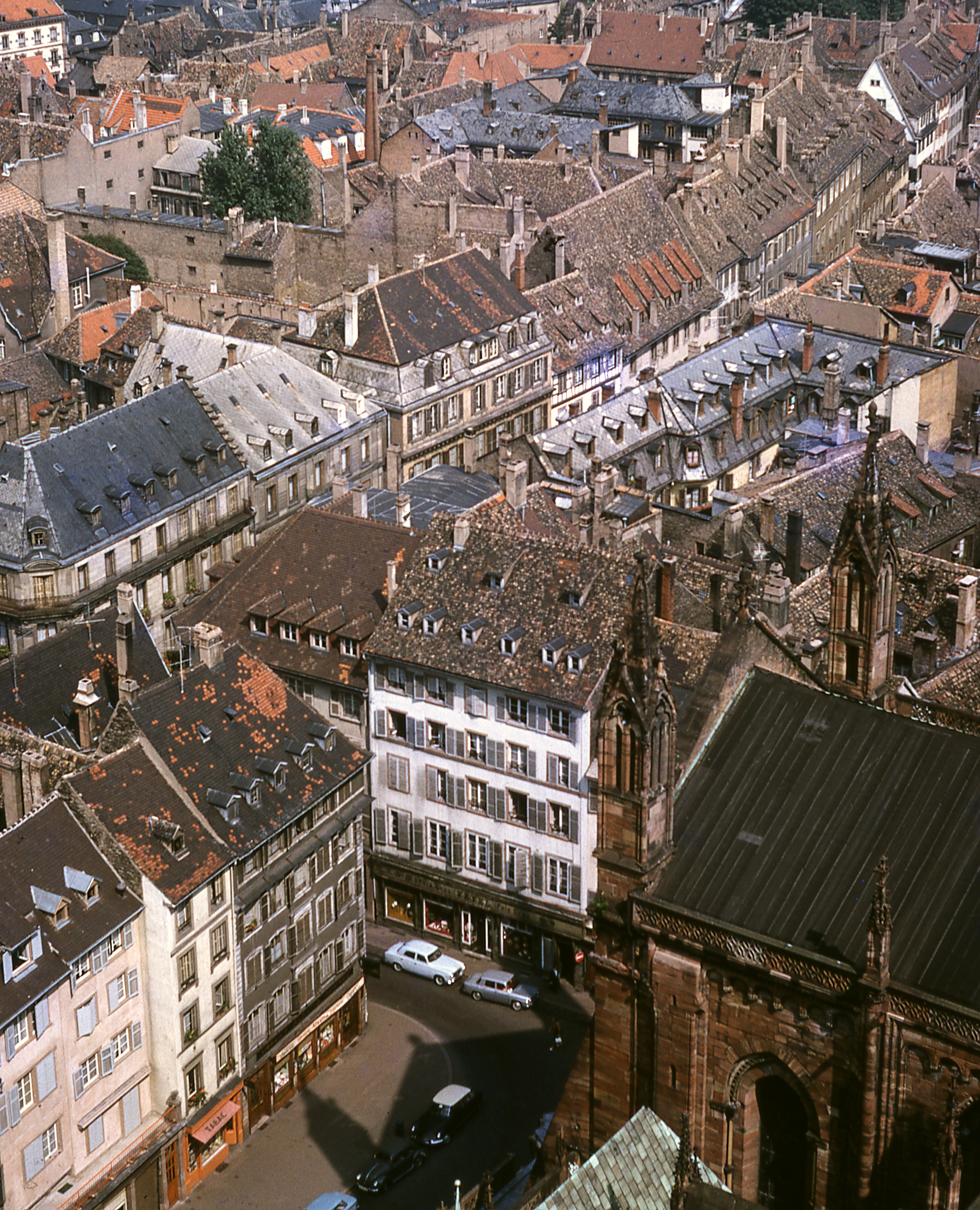
Strasbourg Old Town in 1966

- 1967 – Urban Community of Strasbourg established.
- 1969 – International Institute of Human Rights founded.
- 1972
  - Administration of Urban Community of Strasbourg and City of Strasbourg merged into one entity.
  - Opéra du Rhin formed.
- 1973 - Strasbourg Museum of Modern and Contemporary Art established.
- 1974
  - European Science Foundation established.
  - Discovery of Johann Sebastian Bach's personal copy of the printed edition of the "Goldberg Variations" with the hitherto unknown fourteen canons, BWV 1087.
- 1975 – Palais de la musique et des congrès built (twice expanded afterwards: 1989, 2015)
- 1977 – Palace of Europe built.
- 1978 – City hosts the 1978 European Figure Skating Championships.
- 1982 – Strasbourg becomes part of the Alsace region.
- 1984 – City hosts UEFA European Football Championship.
- 1987 – Internationaux de Strasbourg tennis tournament begins.
- 1988 – Pope John Paul II addresses the European Parliament and the Council of Europe
- 1989
  - Human Frontier Science Program established.
  - City designated headquarters of Eurimages.
- 1990 – Population: 252,338.
- 1991 – École nationale d'administration relocates to Strasbourg.
- 1992
  - City designated headquarters of European Audiovisual Observatory and Eurocorps.
  - Arte television begins broadcasting.
  - Musée archéologique renovated.
- 1994 – Trams begin operating.
- 1995 – Nuits Européennes begins.
- 1998 – Strasbourg Museum of Modern and Contemporary Art building opens.
- 1999 – Louise Weiss building inaugurated.
- 2000
  - Étoile Noire de Strasbourg ice hockey team formed.
  - Strasbourg Cathedral bombing plot

== 21st century ==
- 2001
  - Fabienne Keller becomes mayor.
  - 13 killed and 97 injured by a fallen Platanus tree in Parc de Pourtalès.
- 2005
  - Strasbourg-Ortenau eurodistrict formed.
  - Patinoire Iceberg rink and Le Vaisseau open.
- 2006 – Population: 272,975.
- 2007 – Musée Tomi Ungerer/Centre international de l'illustration opens.
- 2008
  - École européenne de Strasbourg opens.
  - Le Festival européen du film fantastique de Strasbourg begins.
  - Roland Ries becomes mayor.
- 2009 – City hosts NATO Strasbourg–Kehl summit.
- 2011 –- Population: 272,222.
- 2012 – Population: 274,394
- 2014
  - Pope Francis addresses the European Parliament and the Council of Europe.
  - March: Strasbourg municipal election, 2014 held.
  - June: City hosts the 2014 European Fencing Championships.
- 2015 – Population: 277,270
  - December: Alsace-Champagne-Ardenne-Lorraine regional election, 2015 held.
- 2016 – Strasbourg becomes part of the Grand Est region.
- 2018 – A jihadist attacks civilians near the Christmas market, killing five (11 December).

== See also ==
- History of Strasbourg
- List of mayors of Strasbourg
- European institutions in Strasbourg
- Bishopric of Strasbourg
- Archbishop of Strasbourg
- List of heritage sites in Strasbourg

Other cities in the Grand Est region:

- Timeline of Metz
- Timeline of Mulhouse
- Timeline of Nancy, France
- Timeline of Reims
- Timeline of Troyes

== Bibliography ==
=== in English ===
- Jedidiah Morse; Richard C. Morse (1823), "Strasburg", A New Universal Gazetteer (4th ed.), New Haven: S. Converse
- David Brewster, ed. (1832). "Strasburg". Edinburgh Encyclopædia. Philadelphia: Joseph and Edward Parker. hdl:2027/uc2.ark:/13960/t82j6q872.
- John Thomson (1845), "Strasburg", New Universal Gazetteer and Geographical Dictionary, London: H.G. Bohn
- "Strasbourg", Handbook for Travellers in France (8th ed.), London: John Murray, 1861 (+ 1852 Handbook for the Rhine
- "Strassburg", Cook's Tourist's Handbook for Holland, Belgium, and the Rhine, London: Thomas Cook & Son, 1877
- Guide through Strasbourg, Strasbourg: Imprimerie et Lithographe Alsacienne-Lorraine, c. 1900, OL 25399864M
- "Strassburg" . Encyclopædia Britannica. Vol. 25 (11th ed.). 1910. pp. 984–985.
- "Strassburg", The Rhine, Leipzig: Karl Baedeker, 1911, OCLC 21888483
- Trudy Ring, ed. (1995). "Strasbourg". Northern Europe. International Dictionary of Historic Places. Fitzroy Dearborn. ISBN 978-1-136-63944-9.
- John M. Jeep, ed. (2001). "Strasbourg". Medieval Germany: an Encyclopedia. Garland Publishing. ISBN 0-8240-7644-3.

=== in French ===
- "Rhin (Bas): Strasbourg". Annuaire des artistes français: Statistique des beaux-arts en France (in French). Paris: Guyot de Fère. 1833. ISSN 2275-6817.
- Eusèbe Girault de Saint-Fargeau [in French] (1850). "Strasbourg". Guide pittoresque: portatif et complet, du voyageur en France (in French) (3rd ed.). Paris: Firmin Didot frères. p. 647. hdl:2027/uiug.30112081968700.
- Strasbourg illustré, ou Panorama pittoresque, historique et statistique de Strasbourg et de ses environs (in French), Strasbourg: F. Piton, 1855 v.1, v.2
- Nouvelle description de Strasbourg (in French), Strasbourg: Fietta Frères, 1858, OL 14461657M
- "Strasbourg". Vosges, Lorraine, Alsace. Guides Joanne (in French). Hachette et cie. 1913. hdl:2027/uiug.30112105906736.
- Strasbourg (in French). Clermont-Ferrand: Michelin & Cie. 1919. OL 24638163M.

=== in German ===
- Zeiller, Martin (1644). "Strassburg". Topographia Germaniae (in German). Vol. Topographia Alsatiae. Frankfurt. p. 36+.
- Strassburg. Die Chroniken der Deutschen Städte (in German). Vol. 8–9. Leipzig: S. Hirzel Verlag. 1870–1871 – via HathiTrust.
- "Strassburg". Brockhaus' Konversations-Lexikon (in German) (14th ed.). Leipzig: Brockhaus. 1908.
- P. Krauss und E. Uetrecht, ed. (1913). "Strassburg i. Els.". Meyers Deutscher Städteatlas [Meyer's Atlas of German Cities] (in German). Leipzig: Bibliographisches Institut.
