= Timeline of Reims =

The following is a timeline of the history of the city of Reims, France.

== Prior to the 20th century ==
- 3rd century CE
  - Roman Catholic diocese of Reims established.
  - Porte de Mars built.
- 356 – Battle of Durocortorum.
- 496 – Clovis I baptized in Reims.
- 1139 – "Communal charter" granted by Louis VII of France.
- 1179 – Coronation of Philip II of France.
- 1380 – Public clock installed (approximate date).
- 1429 – Coronation of Charles VII of France.
- 1461 - A revolt caused by the salt tax.
- 1481 - Fire destroyed the roof and the spires of Reims Cathedral.
- 1509 – Palace of Tau rebuilt.
- 1547 – Reims University founded.
- 1582 – New Testament of the Douay–Rheims Bible printed in Reims.
- 1628 – Hôtel de Ville completed.
- 1729 – Ruinart champagne house in business.
- 1733 – Parc de la Patte d'Oie laid out.
- 1770 – Fontaine des Boucheries erected.
- 1787 – Northern Cemetery established.^{(fr)}
- 1792 – September massacres.
- 1793 – Population: 32,334.
- 1809 – Bibliothèque de la ville (library) founded.
- 1814 – Battle of Reims (1814).
- 1817 – Chamber of Commerce established.
- 1833 – Roederer champagne house in business.
- 1843 – Southern Cemetery established.^{(fr)}
- 1853 – Courrier de la Champagne newspaper begins publication.
- 1867 – Reims Circus built.
- 1868 – Indépendant Rémois newspaper begins publication.
- 1873 – Reims Opera House opens on Rue de Vesle.
- 1876 – Population: 81,328.
- 1884 – Société de géographie de Reims established.
- 1886 – Population: 97,903.
- 1887 – Avenir de Reims newspaper begins publication.
- 1891 – Eastern Cemetery established on Avenue Jean-Jaurès.^{(fr)}
- 1893 – Western Cemetery established.^{(fr)}
- 1896 – Joan of Arc statue erected in Place du Cardinal-Luçon.
- 1897 – Hôtel de Brimont (mansion) built on Boulevard Lundy.
- 1899 – Bégot & Mazurié automotive company in business.
- 1900 – Bégot & Cail automotive company in business.

== 20th century ==
- 1901 – Emperor Nicholas II of Russia attends in Reims the military review ending the French maneuvers of 1901 upon French president Émile Loubet's invitation
- 1906 - Population: 102,800.
- 1908 – Henri Farman makes the first cross-country flight from Châlons to Reims.
- 1909 – August: Week of Aviation held near Reims.
- 1911 – Population: 115,178.
- 1913 – Museum of Fine Arts opens.
- 1914 – World War I begins.
- 1918 – July: Reims besieged by German forces.
- 1922 – Galeries Lafayette built.
- 1923 – Protestant Church of Reims rebuilt.
- 1926 – Annual Grand Prix de la Marne motor race begins on the Reims-Gueux circuit.
- 1928
  - Reims – Champagne Air Base begins operating.
  - Carnegie Library of Reims opens.
- 1929 – Reims Central Market Hall built.
- 1930 – Monument aux Morts erected in Place de la République.
- 1931 – Stade de Reims football club formed.
- 1935 – City Stadium opens.
- 1937 – Gare de Reims built.
- 1940 – Battle of France; Germans in power.
- 1946 – Reims Aviation in business.
- 1953 – 12 Hours of Reims motor race begins.
- 1968 – Population: 152,967.
- 1971 – University of Reims Champagne-Ardenne established.
- 1977 – Murigny district established.
- 1979 – Comédie de Reims national drama centre active.
- 1992 – ESAD de Reims (art school) active.

== 21st century ==
- 2005 – Reims Métropole established.
- 2008 – November: French Socialist Party congress held in Reims.
- 2009 – Festival Reims Scènes d'Europe begins.
- 2011 – Reims tramway begins operating.
- 2012 – Population: 181,893.
- 2014
  - March: Reims municipal election, 2014 held.
  - Arnaud Robinet becomes mayor.
- 2016 – Reims becomes part of the Grand Est region.

== See also ==
- Reims history
- History of Reims
- Urban planning in Reims
- List of mayors of Reims
- List of heritage sites in Reims
- History of Champagne-Ardenne region

Other cities in the Grand Est region:

- Timeline of Metz
- Timeline of Mulhouse
- Timeline of Nancy, France
- Timeline of Strasbourg
- Timeline of Troyes

== Bibliography ==
=== in English ===
- Clement Cruttwell (1793). "Rheims". Gazetteer of France. London: G.G.J. and J. Robinson. hdl:2027/njp.32101072026824.
- "Reims", Handbook for Travellers in France, London: John Murray, 1861
- William Henry Overall, ed. (1870). "Rheims". Dictionary of Chronology. London: William Tegg. hdl:2027/uc2.ark:/13960/t9m32q949.
- C.B. Black (1876), "Reims", Guide to the North of France, Edinburgh: Adam and Charles Black
- Augustus J. C. Hare (1890), "Reims", North-Eastern France, London: G. Allen, OCLC 1737047
- "Rheims", Northern France, Leipsic: Karl Baedeker, 1899, OCLC 2229516
- "Reims" . Encyclopædia Britannica. Vol. 23 (11th ed.). 1910. p. 54.
- Benjamin Vincent (1910), "Rheims", Haydn's Dictionary of Dates (25th ed.), London: Ward, Lock & Co., hdl:2027/uc2.ark:/13960/t41r6xh8t
- Trudy Ring, ed. (1995). "Reims". Northern Europe. International Dictionary of Historic Places. Fitzroy Dearborn. ISBN 978-1-136-63944-9.
- Colum Hourihane, ed. (2012). "Reims". Grove Encyclopedia of Medieval Art and Architecture. Oxford University Press. ISBN 978-0-19-539536-5.

=== in French ===
- Jean-Baptiste-Joseph Champagnac [in French] (1839). "Reims". Manuel des dates, en forme de dictionnaire (in French). Perisse frères.
- Guillaume Marlot (1843). Histoire de la ville, cité et université de Reims (in French). L. Jacquet. 4 vols. Written in 17th c.
- Eusèbe Girault de Saint-Fargeau [in French] (1850). "Reims". Guide pittoresque: portatif et complet, du voyageur en France (in French) (3rd ed.). Paris: Firmin Didot frères. p. 515. hdl:2027/uiug.30112081968700.
- Histoire de la ville de Reims (in French) (2nd ed.). Reims: Brissart-Binet. 1864.
- A. Hannesse (1879). Histoire populaire de la ville de Reims (in French). impr. coopérative Monge.
- Guide de l'étranger à Reims (in French). Reims: Matot-Braine. 1901.
- "Marne: Description des villes: Reims". Champagne. Géographie pittoresque et monumentale de la France (in French). Flammarion. June 1900. hdl:2027/mdp.39015039821072. OCLC 2170997. circa 1904
- "Reims". Champagne et Ardennes. À la France: sites et monuments (in French). Paris: Touring-Club de France. 1906. OCLC 457600236.
- Gaston Hubert (1910). Institutions municipales & administratives de la ville de Reims sous l'ancien régime (in French). A. Rousseau.
