= Timeline of Troyes =

The following is a timeline of the history of the city of Troyes, France.

== Prior to 14th century ==
- 330–344 CE – Roman Catholic Diocese of Troyes established (approximate date).
- 426 – Lupus of Troyes becomes bishop.
- 9th C. – Abbey of Saint Loup, Troyes founded.
- 867 – Religious Council held.
- 878 – Religious Council held.
- 892 – Troyes sacked by Norman forces.
- 898 – Troyes sacked by Norman forces again.
- 1107 – Religious Council held.
- 1129 – Religious Council held.
- 1152 – Henry I, Count of Champagne in power.
- 1188 – Fire.
- 1208 – Rebuilding of Troyes Cathedral begins.
- 1242 - Theobald I of Navarre grants charters to the inhabitants.
- 1262 – Basilica of St. Urbain, Troyes founded.

== 14th–19th centuries ==
- 1304 – "Union of Champagne with the domains of the king of France."
- 1359 – Couvent des Cordeliers de Troyes (convent) construction begins.
- 1380 – Public clock installed (approximate date).
- 1419/25 - Troyes becomes temporary seat of government of Kingdom of France during the Hundred Years' War.
- 1429 – July: Siege of Troyes by forces of Dauphin of France Charles VII.
- ca.1500 - Population: 40,000. (approximate date)
- 1508 – Église de la Madeleine de Troyes (church) rebuilt.
- 1518 – Plague.
- 1524 – Fire destroys large part of city.
- 1550 – Hôtel de Mauroy and Église Saint-Pantaléon de Troyes (church) built.
- 1562 - Short occupation by Calvinist troops.
- 1651 – Public library founded.
- 1670 – Hôtel de Ville completed.
- 1790 – Troyes becomes part of the Aube souveraineté.
- 1793 – Population: 26,751.
- 1798 – Société académique d'agriculture, des sciences, arts et belles-lettres du département de l'Aube founded.
- 1801 – Cantons 1, 2, and 3 created.
- 1830 – Journal de l'Aube newspaper in publication.
- 1831 – Archaeology museum opens in the former Abbey of Saint Loup.
- 1846 – Canal de la Haute-Seine opens.
- 1861 – Cirque de Troyes built.
- 1886 – Population: 46,972.
- 1899 – Tramway de Troyes begins operating.

== 20th century ==
- 1901 – La Tribune de l'Aube newspaper begins publication.
- 1905 – Cirque municipal de Troyes rebuilt.
- 1906 - Population: 51,228.
- 1911 – Population: 55,486.
- 1912 – Gare de Troyes (train station) rebuilt.
- 1925
  - Stade de l'Aube (stadium) opens.
  - Société archéologique du département de l'Aube founded.
- 1931 – Association sportive Troyes Sainte-Savine (football club) formed.
- 1933 – Troyes – Barberey Airport established.
- 1945 – Regional L'Est-Éclair newspaper begins publication.
- 1948 – Musée de Vauluisant (museum) founded.
- 1963 – Sauvegarde et Avenir de Troyes (preservation society) founded.
- 1973 – Cantons 4, 5, 6, and 7 created.
- 1982 – Musée d'art moderne de Troyes (museum) opens.
- 1984 – Centre Troyen de Recherches et d'Études Pierre et Nicolas Pithou established.
- 1986 – Troyes AC (football club) formed.
- 1987 – Nogent Nuclear Power Plant commissioned in vicinity of Troyes.
- 1988 – Nuits de Champagne festival begins.
- 1993
  - Marques Avenue (shopping centre) in business.
  - Agglomeration community Grand Troyes (regional government) created.
- 1994 – University of Technology of Troyes established.
- 1995 – François Baroin becomes mayor.

== 21st century ==
- 2002 – Médiathèque du Grand Troyes (library) opens.
- 2009 – "Le Beau xvie Siècle" art exhibition held.
- 2012 – Population: 60,009.
- 2016 – Troyes becomes part of the Grand Est region.

== See also ==
- Troyes history (fr)
- List of mayors of Troyes
- List of bishops of Troyes
- List of counts of Champagne
- List of heritage sites in Troyes
- Aube department history

Other cities in the Grand Est region:

- Timeline of Metz
- Timeline of Mulhouse
- Timeline of Nancy, France
- Timeline of Reims
- Timeline of Strasbourg

== Bibliography ==
- Jean-Baptiste-Joseph Champagnac [in French] (1839). "Troyes". Manuel des dates, en forme de dictionnaire (in French). Perisse frères.
- Émile Socard, ed. (1881). Catalogue de la Bibliothèque de la ville de Troyes: Ouvrages intéressant l'histoire de Troyes et du départment de l'Aube (in French). Bertrand-Hu. v.2
- Truslove, Roland (1910). "Troyes" . Encyclopædia Britannica. Vol. 27 (11th ed.). pp. 319–320.
- La vie a Troyes sous Louis XIII: une ville de province pendant la premiere moitie du XVIIe siecle (in French), Centre Troyen de Recherche et d'Etudes Pierre et Nicolas Pithou, 1984
- A. Bouisseau; et al. (1999), Histoire de Troyes (in French)
- Colum Hourihane, ed. (2012). "Troyes". Grove Encyclopedia of Medieval Art and Architecture. Oxford University Press. ISBN 978-0-19-539536-5.
