= List of historic sites in Metz, France =

The following table presents an incomplete list of monuments classified monument historique in the city of Metz, capital of the French region of Lorraine and prefecture of the department of Moselle.

== List of the Historic Monuments in Metz ==
=== Religious Monuments ===
Monument	Image	Current Use	Address	Period	Year of Classification	Notes	Reference
Saint-Arnulf Abbey of Metz		Circle Officer	Aux-Ours and Poncelet Streets	16th century	1986	Ancient imperial necropolis of the family of Emperor Charlemagne. Displays a polychromatic Pietà from the 16th century.	
Saint-Clement Abbey of Metz		Lorraine Region Parliament	Pontiffroy Street	17th century	1972		
Sainte-Glossinde Abbey of Metz		Episcopal Palace	Sainte-Glossinde Square	18th century	1978		
Saint-Pierre-aux-Nonnains Basilica of Metz		Exhibition venue (see: Metz Arsenal)	Esplanade Garden	4th century	1909	Once a Roman spa, it is the oldest church in France and one of the oldest in Europe and in the world.	
Saint-Stephen Cathedral		Cathedral	John Paul II Square	13th century	1930	Largest expanse of stained glass windows in the world and tenth highest nave in the world. Displays stained glass windows of Hermann von Münster, Laurent-Charles Maréchal, Valentin Bousch, Marc Chagall, Roger Bissière, and Jacques Villon	
Mercy Chapel		Chapel	Street of the Chèvre	12th century	1968		
Templars' Chapel		Exhibition venue (see: Metz Arsenal)	Esplanade Garden	12th century	1840	Once part of the Templar commandery of Metz, the oldest Templar institution of the Holy Roman Empire.	
Petit-Saint-Jean Chapel		Ruins	Vincentrue Street	13th century	1973		
Saint-Genest Chapel		Chapel	En-Jurue	12th century	1929	Edifice adjacent to the house where François Rabelais lived in Metz	
East Cemetery		Cemetery	Strasbourg Avenue	19th century	2003	Catholic necropolis	
Saint-Clement Church		Lorraine Parliament	Gabriel-Hocquard Square	16th century	1992		
Saint-Sauveur Collegiate		Ruins	Petit-Paris Street	15th century	1929		
Recollets Convent of Metz		Municipal Archives	Recollets and Abbé-Risse Streets	14th century	1972		
Carmelites Convent of Metz		Jazz Concert Venue	Trinitarians' Impasse	13th century	1930		
Grands-Carmes Church		Ruins	Marchant Street	14th century	1929		
Trinitarian Church of Metz		Museums of Metz	Trinitarians' Street	18th century	1973		
Notre-Dame Church of Metz		Church	Goat's Street	17th century	1968	Displays a rare complete set of 21 stained glass windows of Laurent-Charles Maréchal.	
Sainte-Lucie Church of Metz		Church	Jean-Pierre-Jean Street	11th century	1991		
Sainte-Ségolène Church of Metz		Church	Joan of Arc Square	13th century	1981		
Sainte-Thérèse-de-l'Enfant-Jésus Church of Metz		Church	Verdun Street	20th century	1998	Built by architect Roger-Henri Expert, displays stained glass windows by Nicolas Untersteller.	
Saint-Étienne-le-Dépenné Church of Metz		Private Edifice	Gaudrée Street	14th century	1928		
Saint-Eucaire Church of Metz		Church	Germans' Street	12th century	1979		
Saint-Martin Church of Metz		Church	Lasalle Street	12th century	1925		
Saint-Maximin Church of Metz		Church	Mazelle Street	12th century	1923	Displays stained glass windows of Jean Cocteau.	
Saint-Simon-Saint-Jude Church of Metz		Church	France's Square	18th century	1989	Near the launching site of the first airmail carrier.	
Saint-Vincent Abbey of Metz		Basilica, High School, and Tourist Attraction	Saint-Vincent Square	10th century	1930		
Protestant New Temple		Church	Comedy's Square	20th century	1930	Temple Neuf	
Synagogue of Metz		Synagogue	Rabbin-Elie-Bloch Street	19th century	1984	Displays interesting sculpted Torah ark and designed Parochet.	

=== Military Monuments ===
Monument	Image	Current Use	Address	Period	Year of Classification	Notes	Reference
Cloister's Barracks		High School		17th century	1926		
Ney Barracks		Barracks	Republic's Square	19th century	1929		
Royal Military School		Military School	Winston-Churchill Street	18th century	1929		
Medieval Defensive Walls		Parks and Gardens	Along the Moselle and the Seille Rivers	13th century	1929		
Germans' Gate		Ornament	Maginot Boulevard	13th century	1929	Medieval defensive gate	
Camoufle Tower		Ornament	Foch Avenue	15th century	1929	Medieval watchtower	
Queuleu Fort		Memorial and Park	Jean Burger Alley	19th century	1970	Use as detention and torture center by the Waffen-SS during World War II.	
Bellecroix Fort		Ornament and Parks	Corps-Expéditionnaire-Français's Street	18th century	1982	Fortification of Louis de Cormontaigne.	
Citadel Store Food		Hotel	Ney Avenue	17th century	1969	Remains of the fortifications of Vauban.	
Military Hospital of the Moselle Fort		Administration	Paul-Wiltzer Embankment	18th century	1937		
Moselle fort		Housing		18th century	1929		
Chambière Barrack Gates		Ornament		18th century	1929		

=== Civil Monuments ===
Monument	Image	Current Use	Address	Period	Year of Classification	Notes	Reference
Antonist Granary		Medical Center	Piques Street	14th century	1930		
Coislin Fountain		Ornament	Coislin Street	18th century	1929		
Chèvremont Granary		Museums of Metz	Chèvremont Street	13th century	1924		
Saint-Nicolas Fountain		Ornament	Saint-Nicolas Square	18th century	1929		
Gargan Private House		House	En-Nexirue	15th century	1929		
Bulette Private House		House	Sainte-Croix Square	14th century	1931		
Sainte-Croix Fountain		House	Walls' and Hell Streets	18th century	1929		
Malta Private House		Ornament	Sainte-Croix Square	13th century	1989		
Town Square		Public Place	Place d'Armes	18th century	1948	Built on the place of the ancient Palace of the Republic of Metz. Work of the Royal architect Jacques-François Blondel in order built in Metz a modern square in a context of the Enlightenment.	
Burtaigne Private House		Housing	Charrons' Square	16th century	2006		
Saint-Livier Private House		Exhibition venue and museum	Trinitarians' Street	12th century	1939	The oldest civilian edifice of the city, today the Contemporary Art Deposit of the Lorraine Region.	
Heu Private House		Housing	Fountain's Street	15th century	1990		
Opera-Theater and surrounding edifices		Opera House	Comedy's Square	18th century	1930	Oldest opera house working in France.	
Saint-Louis Square and its Buildings		Housing, markets, and public place	Saint-Louis Square	13th century	1929	Built on the ancient defensive walls of Roman Divodurum.	
Gournay Private House		Housing	Grand-Deer Street	18th century	1929	Birthplace of General Antoine Charles Louis de Lasalle.	
Heads' House		Restaurant	En-Fournirue	16th century	1929		
Verlaine's House		Museum	Haute-Pierre Street	19th century	1978	Birthplace of Poet Paul Verlaine.	
Chamber's Square		Housing, Markets, Restaurants, and Hotel	Chamber Square	16th and 18th centuries	1923		
Saint-Stephen Square		Public place	Saint-Stephen Square	18th century	1975	Once used as an amphitheatre for Mystery plays during the Middle Ages	
Thermae Bridge		Bridge		4th century 14th century	1927	Displays remains of a Gallo-Roman bridge.	
Gallo-Roman Ruins		Museums of Metz	Haut-Poirier Street	4th century	1938	Remains of the public baths of ancient Gallo-Roman Divodurum.	
Various houses and edifices		Housing	Metz Streets	from 13th to 19th century	from 1928 to 1986		

=== Administrative Monuments ===
Monument	Image	Current Use	Address	Period	Year of Classification	Notes	Reference
Metz Railway Station		Railway Station	General De Gaulle Square	20th century	1975	Built during German annexation. Station-Palace as it displays the apartments of the Kaiser.	
Saint-Nicolas Hospice		Administration	Saint-Nicolas Square	16th century	1993	Oldest Hospital of Metz.	
City Hall		City Hall	Town Square	18th century	1922	Work of Royal architect Jacques-François Blondel.	
Guardroom		Tourism Office	Town Square	18th century	1921	Work of Royal architect Jacques-François Blondel.	
Parliament of Metz		Markets	Town Square	18th century	1928	Work of Royal architect Jacques-François Blondel.	
Guildhall		Bank and Restaurant	Mondon Square	20th century	2002	Built during German annexation.	
Central Post Office		Post Office	Gambetta Street	20th century	1975	Built during German annexation.	
Royal Governor Palace		Courthouse	Haute-Pierre Street	18th century	1921	Place where Lafayette decided to participate to the American Revolutionary War.	
Imperial Governor Palace		Military Headquarters	Citadel Street	20th century	1975	Serves as residence of the Kaiser during his visits in Metz.	
