= Timeline of Nancy =

The coat of arms of Nancy, which incorporates various coats of arms of its former rulers such as the Dukes of Lorraine

The history of Nancy, France, the capital city of Lorraine, dates back to at least 800 BC with the earliest signs of human settlement in the area. Early settlers were likely attracted by easily mined iron ore and a ford in the Meurthe River. A small fortified town named Nanciacum (Nancy) was built by Gerard, Duke of Lorraine around 1050.

== Prior to 19th century ==
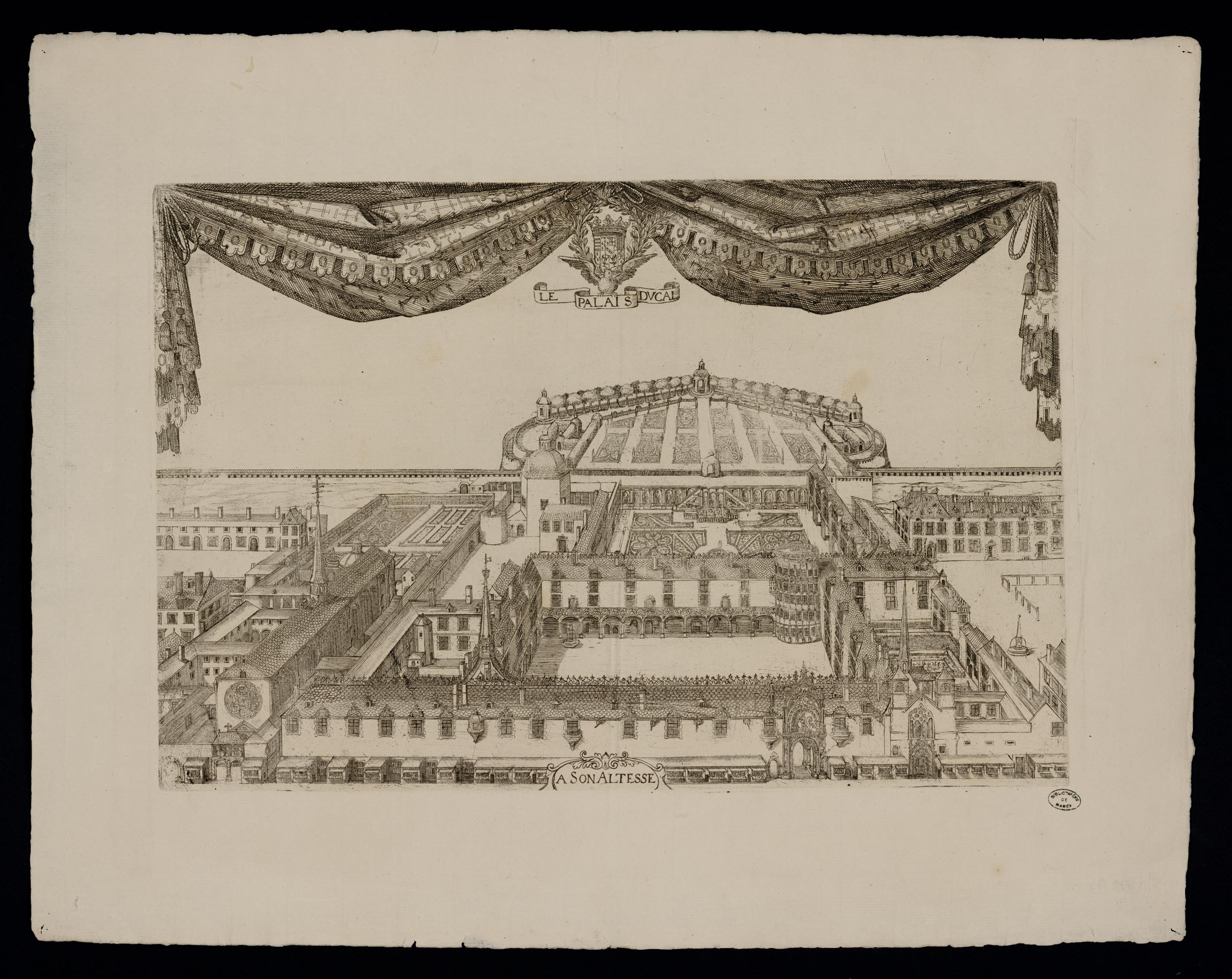
Engraving of the ducal palace complex, 1664

- 1140 – Tour de la Commanderie Saint-Jean-du-Vieil-Aître (tower, oldest building of Nancy) built.
- 1228 – Castle burns down.
- 1382 – Porte de la Craffe (gate) built.
- 1476 – Charles of Burgundy in power.
- 1477 – 5 January: Battle of Nancy; René II, Duke of Lorraine in power again.
- 1487 – Church of the Cordeliers, Nancy built.
- 1496 – Palace of the Dukes of Lorraine construction begins.
- 1633 – Town "taken by the French."
- 1697 – Peace of Ryswick & Leopold, Duke of Lorraine in power.
- 1731 – St. Sebastian's Church, Nancy built.
- 1736 – Stanisław Leszczyński becomes Duke of Lorraine.
- 1750 – Royal Society of Science and Humanities of Nancy and public library founded.
- 1753 – Palais du gouvernement de Nancy built (approximate date).
- 1755 – Place Stanislas and the Hôtel de Ville created, includes a statue of the eponymous Stanisław Leszczyński.
- 1763 – Great organ of Nancy Cathedral installed.
- 1766 – Nancy becomes part of France.
- 1777 – Roman Catholic Diocese of Nancy established.
- 1782 – Chapelle de la Visitation de Nancy built.
- 1784 – Porte Désilles (arch) built.
- 1790
  - 31 August: Military mutiny quashed.
  - Nancy becomes part of the Meurthe souveraineté.
- 1792 – Statue of Louis XV removed from the Place Stanislas.
- 1793 – Museum of Fine Arts of Nancy established.
- 1798 – Journal de la Meurthe newspaper in publication.

== 19th century ==
- 1814–1815 – Nancy occupied by allied forces during the Napoleonic Wars.
- 1844 – Lycée Henri-Loritz (school) founded.
- 1848 – Musée Lorrain established.
- 1852 – Covered Market, Nancy opens.
- 1856 – Gare de Nancy-Ville built.
- 1859 – Annual Foire de Nancy relocated to the Cours Léopold.
- 1870 – Nancy "put to ransom by the Prussians."
- 1873 – Société des Sciences de Nancy active.
- 1874 – Saint-Epvre Basilica built.
- 1879 – Thiers statue erected in the Place Thiers (Nancy).
- 1884 – Orchestre symphonique et lyrique de Nancy founded.
- 1886 - Population: 79,038.
- 1889 – L'Est Républicain newspaper begins publication.

== 20th century ==
- 1906 - Population: 98,302.
- 1909 – Chambre de commerce et d'industrie de Meurthe-et-Moselle built on Rue Henri-Poincaré (Nancy).
- 1911
  - Brasserie Excelsior built.
  - Population: 119,949.
- 1914 – September: Battle of Grand Couronné.
- 1919 – Opera house rebuilt.
- 1923 – Comité Nancy-Paris art group formed.
- 1944 – September: Battle of Nancy (1944).
- 1951 – Marriage of Archduke Otto von Habsburg-Lothringen, crown prince of Austria-Hungary and Duke of Lorraine, with Princess Regina of Saxe-Meiningen, at the Church of Saint-François-des-Cordeliers. The marriage was attended by his mother Empress Zita of Bourbon-Parma and high nobility.
- 1964 – Musée de l'École de Nancy opens.
- 1970 – Henri Poincaré University, Nancy 2 University, and School of architecture of Nancy established.
- 1972 - Académie de Nancy-Metz active.
- 1978 - Livre sur la place literary festival begins.
- 1982 – Nancy becomes part of the Lorraine region.
- 1983 – André Rossinot becomes mayor.
- 1988 – Radio Caraïb Nancy begins broadcasting.
- 1991
  - Metz–Nancy–Lorraine Airport opens.
  - Sister city relationship established with Cincinnati, USA.
- 1996 – Festival du film de chercheur de Nancy begins.
- December 2012 – Archduke Christoph of Austria, son of Archduke Carl Christian of Austria, marries in the Basilica of Saint-Epvre

== 21st century ==
- 2005 – Kinepolis Nancy (cinema) opens.
- 2006 – Teranga Festival begins.
- 2012 – Population: 105,067.
- 2014 – Laurent Hénart becomes mayor.
- 2016 – Nancy becomes part of the Grand Est region.

== See also ==
- Nancy history
- History of Nancy
- List of mayors of Nancy (in French)
- List of heritage sites in Nancy

Other cities in the Grand Est region:

- Timeline of Metz
- Timeline of Mulhouse
- Timeline of Reims
- Timeline of Strasbourg
- Timeline of Troyes

== Bibliography ==
=== in English ===
- "Nancy", A handbook for travellers in France, London: John Murray, 1861
- C.B. Black (1876), "Nancy", Guide to the north of France, Edinburgh: Adam and Charles Black
- Augustus J. C. Hare (1890), "Nancy", North-eastern France, London: G. Allen, OCLC 1737047, OL 6934075M
- "Nancy", Northern France, Leipsic: Karl Baedeker, 1899, OCLC 2229516
- "Nancy" . Encyclopædia Britannica. Vol. 19 (11th ed.). 1910. pp. 160–161.
- Trudy Ring, ed. (1995). "Nancy". Northern Europe. International Dictionary of Historic Places. Fitzroy Dearborn. p. 511+. ISBN 978-1-136-63944-9.

=== in French ===
- J. J. Lionnois (1811). Histoire des villes vieille et neuve de Nancy (in French). Haener.
- Grosjean, N.; Lepage, Henri (1830), Annuaire ... de Meurthe (in French) (one year in an ongoing annual)
- Émile Bégin [in French] (1835). Guide de l'étranger à Nancy (in French). Nancy: Vidart et Jullien.
- Jean-Baptiste-Joseph Champagnac [in French] (1839). "Nancy". Manuel des dates, en forme de dictionnaire (in French). Perisse frères.
- Jean Cayon (1846). Histoire physique, civile, morale et politique de Nancy (in French). Nancy: Cayon-Liébault.
- Prosper Guerrier de Dumast (1847). Nancy; histoire et tableau (in French) (2nd ed.). Vagner.
- Bibliothèque impériale (1863). "Localités: Nancy". Catalogue de l'histoire de France (in French). Vol. 8. Paris: Firmin Didot frères. (Bibliography)
- Promenade dans Nancy et ses environs (in French). Nancy: Lucien Wiener. 1866.
- Charles Courbe (1886). Les rues de Nancy du XVIe siècle à nos jours [The streets of Nancy from the 16th century to today] (in French). Imprimerie Lorraine.
- Nancy (1895). Nancy. Guides Joanne (in French).
- J. Favier, ed. (1898). Catalogue des livres et documents imprimés du fonds lorrain de la bibliothèque municipale de Nancy (in French). Nancy: Crépin-Leblond.
- Christian Pfister (1902). Histoire de Nancy (in French). Berger-Levrault.
- "Nancy". Lorraine. À la France: sites et monuments (in French). Paris: Touring-Club de France. 1906. hdl:2027/pst.000010229187. OCLC 457600236.
- Nancy, Toul, Luneville, Metz. Guides Diamant (in French). Paris: Hachette. 1914. hdl:2027/mdp.39015069886532.
