= Battle of Dornach (1914) =

Battle in Mulhouse, German Empire

- Part of First World War
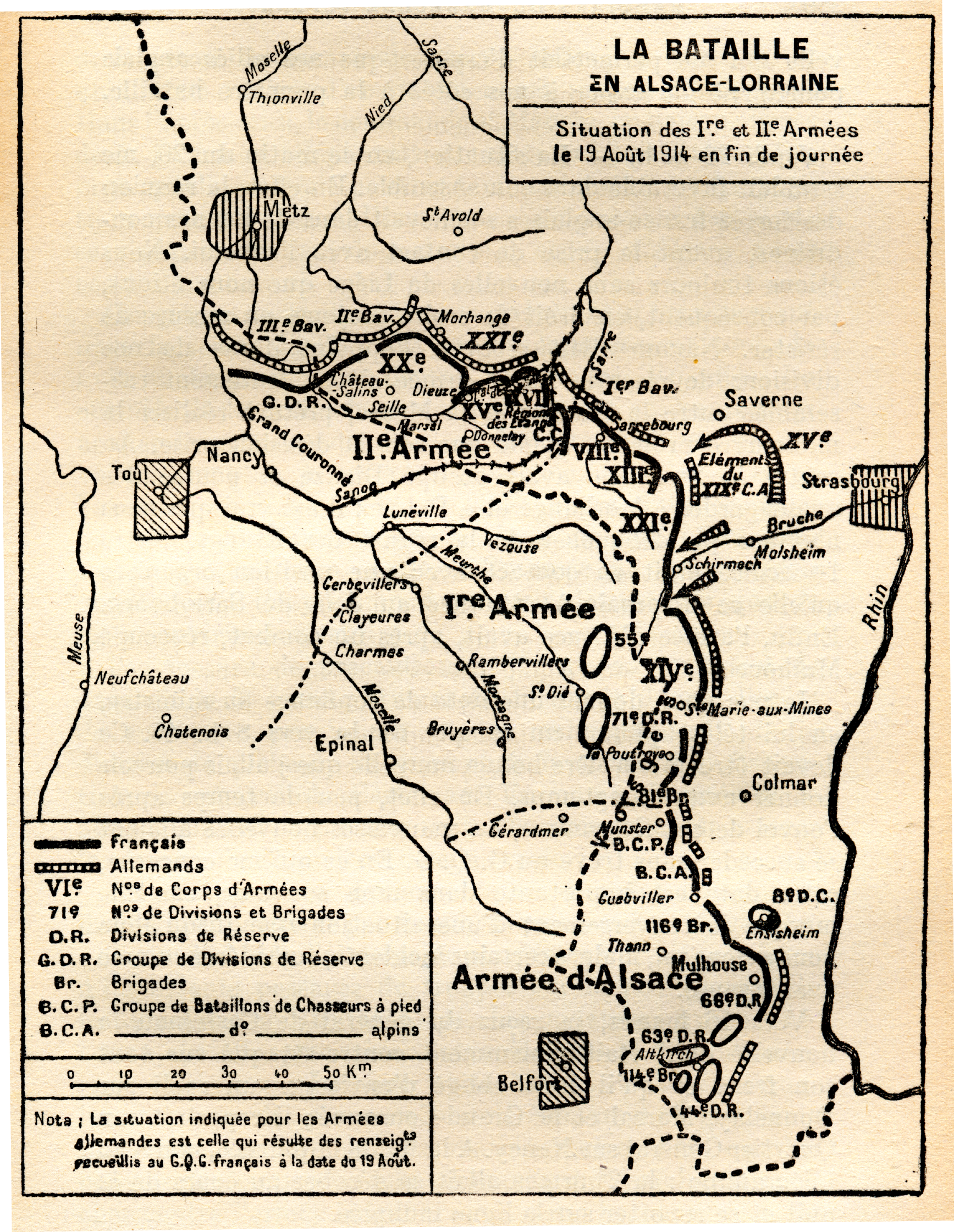
Date	19 August 1914
Location	Dornach (Mulhouse), France
Result	French victory

On 19 August 1914, at the beginning of the First World War, the Battle of Dornach pitted the Germans against the French in the Dornach district of Mulhouse, a city then in the German Empire of Wilhelm II since the French defeat of 1870.

== Context ==
After the French offensive in Upper Alsace, launched on 7 August 1914 General Bonneau's troops entered Mulhouse the very next day after an initial battle; shortly afterwards, they were forced to retreat during a counter-attack by the German XIV and XV army corps on 10 August the Germans occupied Mulhouse again.

== History ==
On 18 August, the French troops resumed the offensive. Germans and French found themselves facing each other at Dornach the very next morning. The "Battle of Dornach", also called the "Second Battle of Mulhouse" began.

It was in this new suburb of Mulhouse, with its villas, gardens, walls, and hedges, that German resistance to the French attack was fiercest. To slow the French advance, the Germans strung electrified wires. The French artillery, under the command of Colonel Nivelle, commander of the 5th Field Artillery Regiment, fired a large number of shells at the houses of Dornach to support the advance of its infantry.

The 35th, 42nd, 44th and 60th Infantry Regiments of the 14th Division particularly distinguished themselves, as did the sappers of the 4th Engineer Regiment.

On 19 August, around 5 p.m., French troops retook Mulhouse. Hundreds of dead and wounded were reported on both sides. French troops took about a thousand prisoners. The 8th Cavalry Division pushed the Germans back to Ensisheim, 20 kilometers north of Mulhouse.

== Aftermath of the battle ==
To avoid encirclement, French troops abandoned Mulhouse on 25 August 1914 and the front would then stabilize for the remainder of the war along a line from Pfetterhouse to Altkirch, Thann, Hartmannswillerkopf, Munster, Collet du Linge, and Col du Bonhomme. It would then be necessary to wait for the 17 November 1918 to witness the entry of General Hirschauer's victorious French troops into Mulhouse.

== See also ==
- List of military engagements of World War I
- Battle of Mulhouse (1914)
- Battle of the Frontiers
- 1914 French mobilization
- 1914 German mobilization
