= Covered Market, Metz =

Coordinates: 49.1201°N 6.1738°E

Metz Covered Market
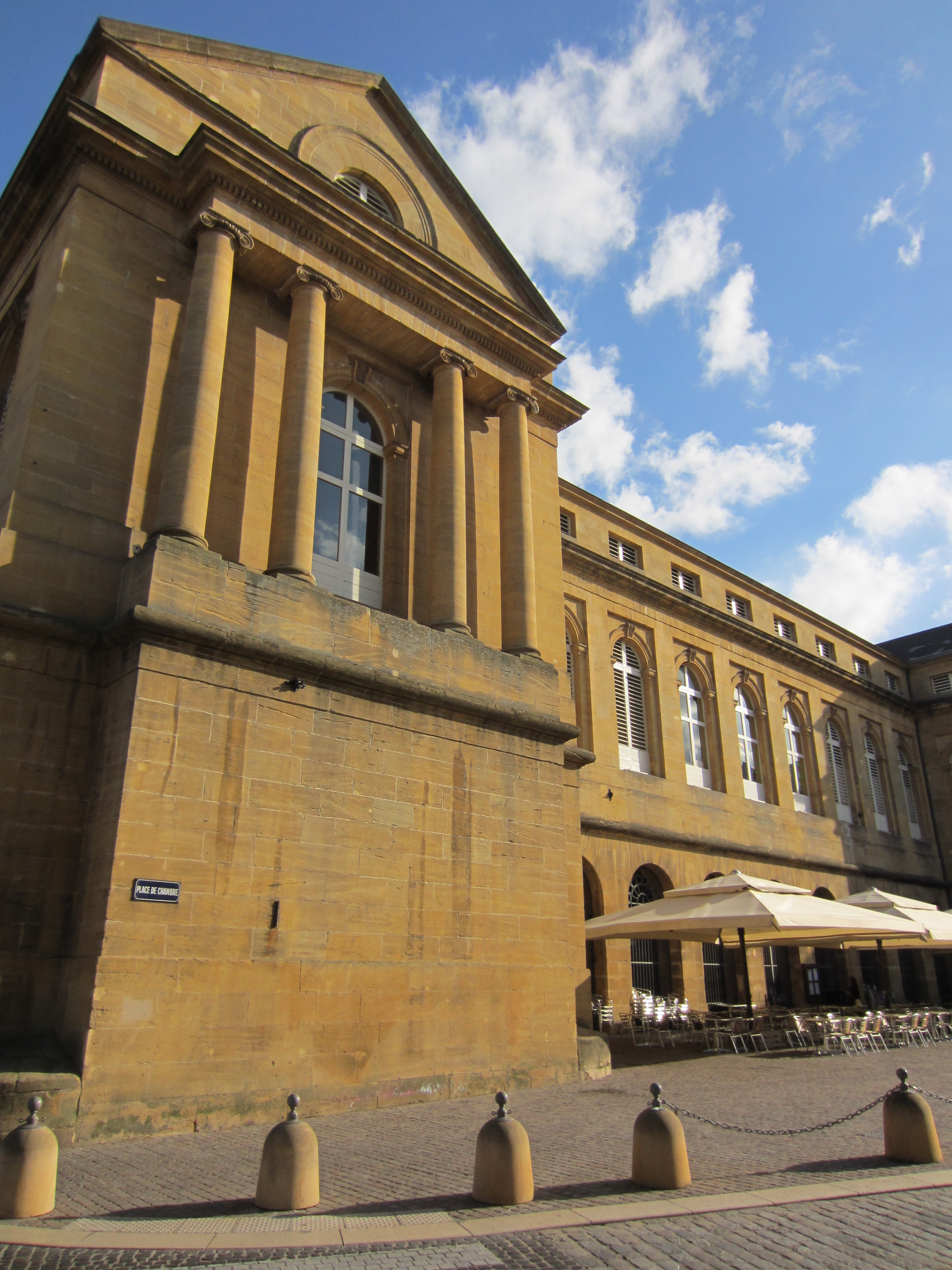
- Backyard facade of the Metz Covered Market
- Interactive map of the Metz Covered Market area

General information
- Architectural style: neo-Classical
- Location: Metz, France
- Construction started: 1785
- Inaugurated: 1831
- Owner: Municipality of Metz

Design and construction
- Architects: Jacques-François Blondel, Pierre-Sylvestre Jaunez

The Metz Covered Market (French: Marché Couvert de Metz) is a historic market with permanent stalls and shops in a large covered structure in the historical centre of Metz, capital of the Lorraine region in France. The Covered Market is one of the oldest, most grandiose in France and is home to traditional local food producers and retailers.

== History ==
In 1762 the Bishop of Metz commissioned the royal architect Jacques-François Blondel to design a new episcopal palace. The project was included in a larger urban renovation in a context of the Age_of_Enlightenment. The works began in 1785 but the French Revolution in 1789 stopped work. The incomplete building remained vacant until 1821, when it was bought by the municipality of Metz. The Messin architect Pierre-Sylvestre Jaunez reconfigured the building to instal a municipal covered market within its walls.

== Architecture and urbanization ==
The Metz Covered Market is a neo-Classical, U-shaped building extending over 5,000 m^{2} (54,000 sq ft). It is located in the historical centre of Metz being adjacent to the Metz Cathedral forecourt. The backyard, the Chamber's Square (French: Place de la Chambre), is surrounded by numerous local food restaurants. Since the 1970s, The basement of the edifice is used as an underground parking lot of 387 parking spaces.

== The market ==
The Metz Covered Market encompasses over 40 shops. It is home to numerous traders, mostly food retailers, including greengrocers, butchers, cheesemakers, and wine dealers. There are also traditional market shops selling fresh, local food, such as quiche, potée Lorraine, and pâté lorrain. Every Saturday morning, the Covered Market is surrounded by a street market held on the Metz Cathedral forecourt.

== Gallery ==
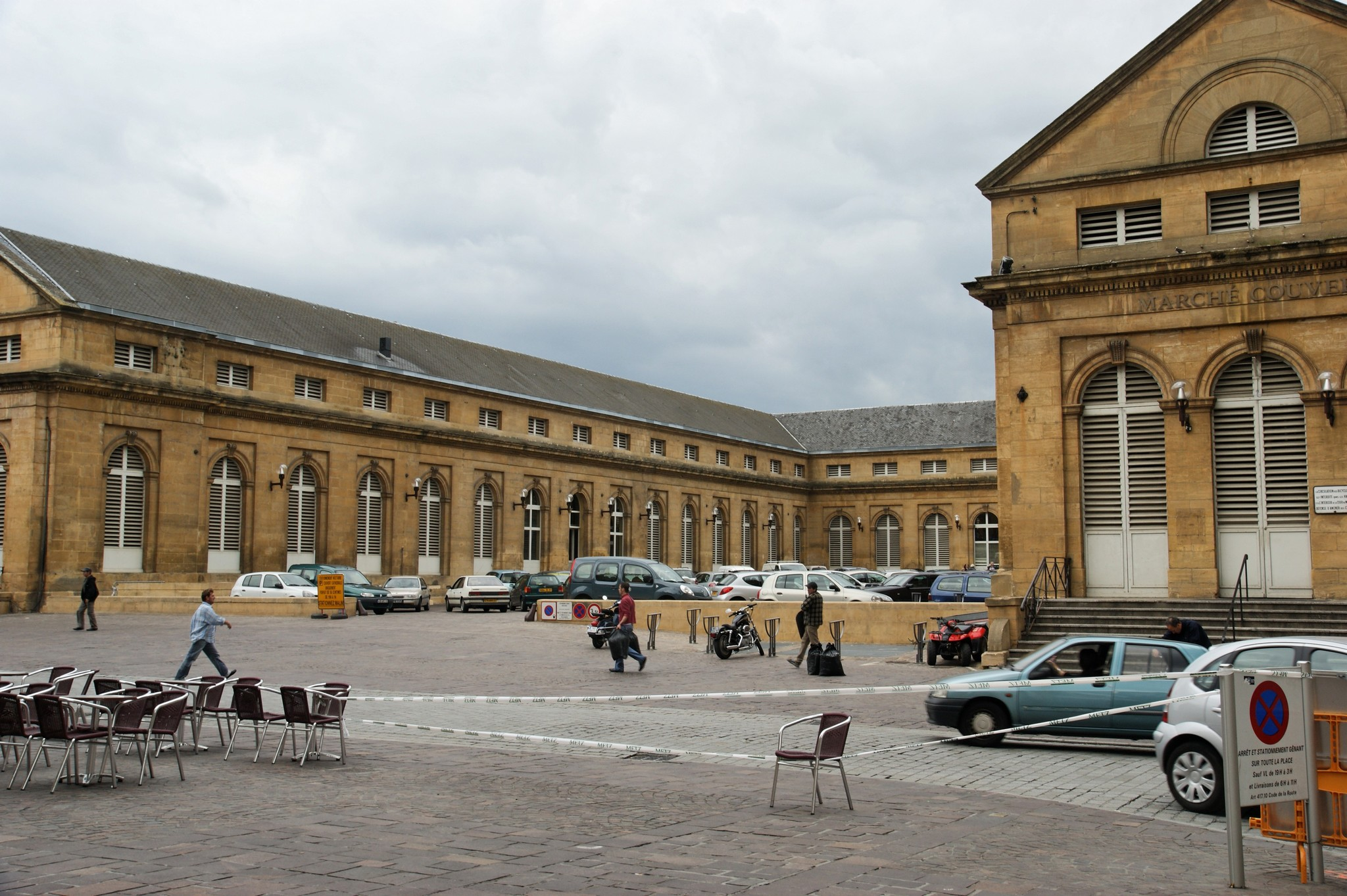
View of the Covered Market from the Metz Cathedral forecourt.

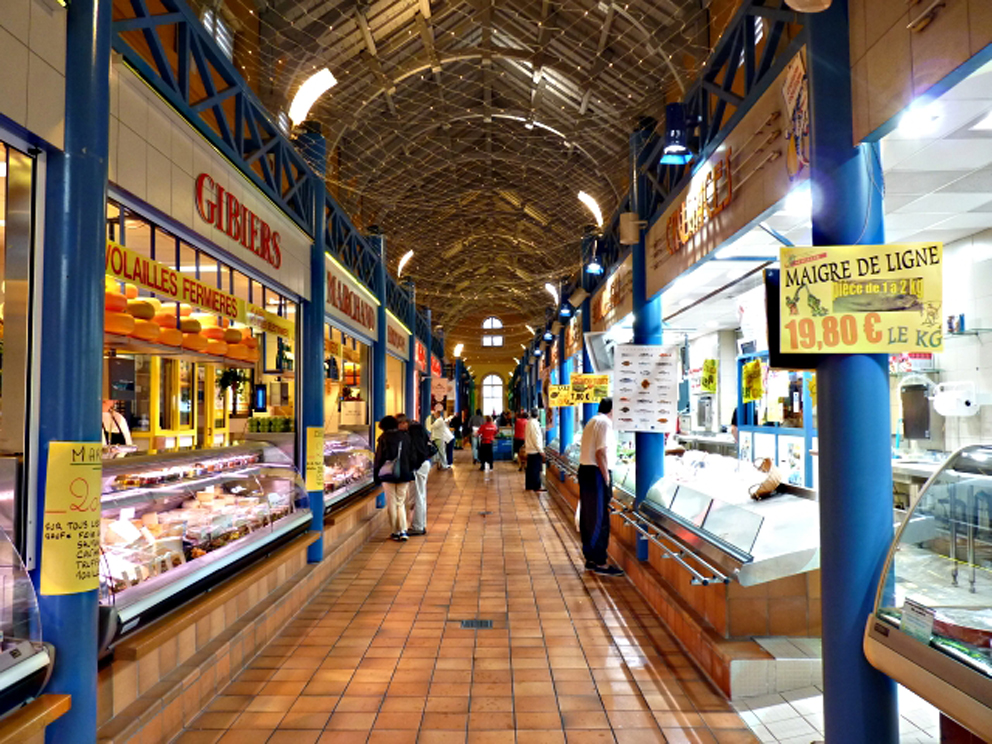
Gallery of the Metz Covered Market.

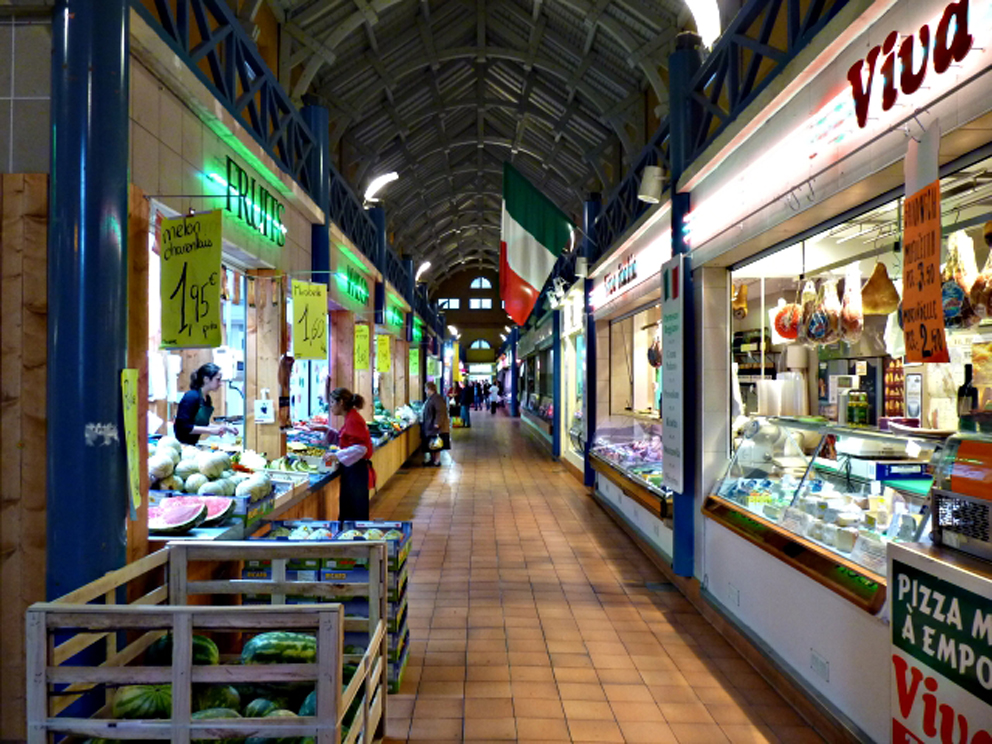
Gallery of the Metz Covered Market.
