= Dornach (Mulhouse) =

Residential district in Mulhouse

- Administration
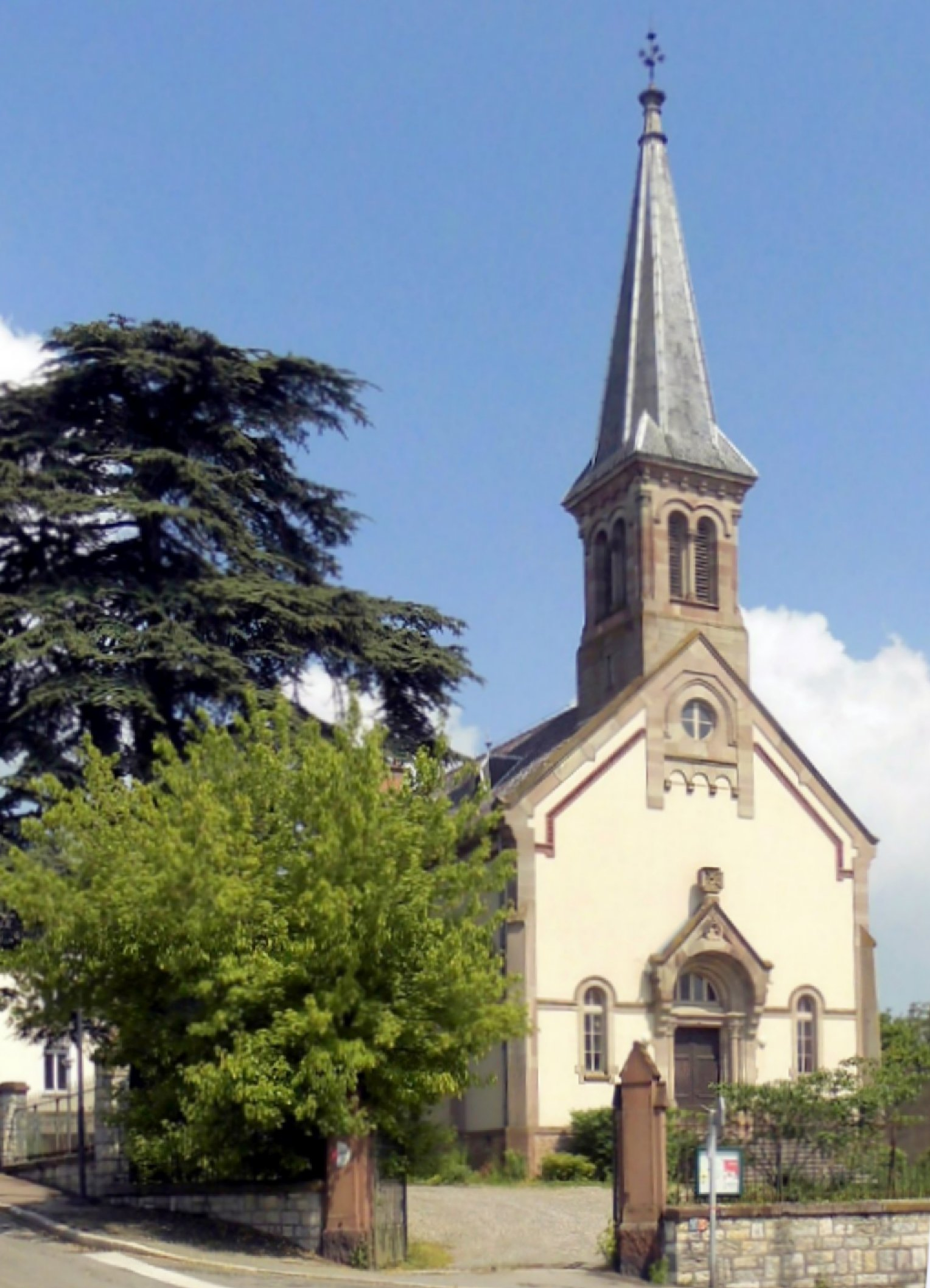
- Dornach Reformed Temple.

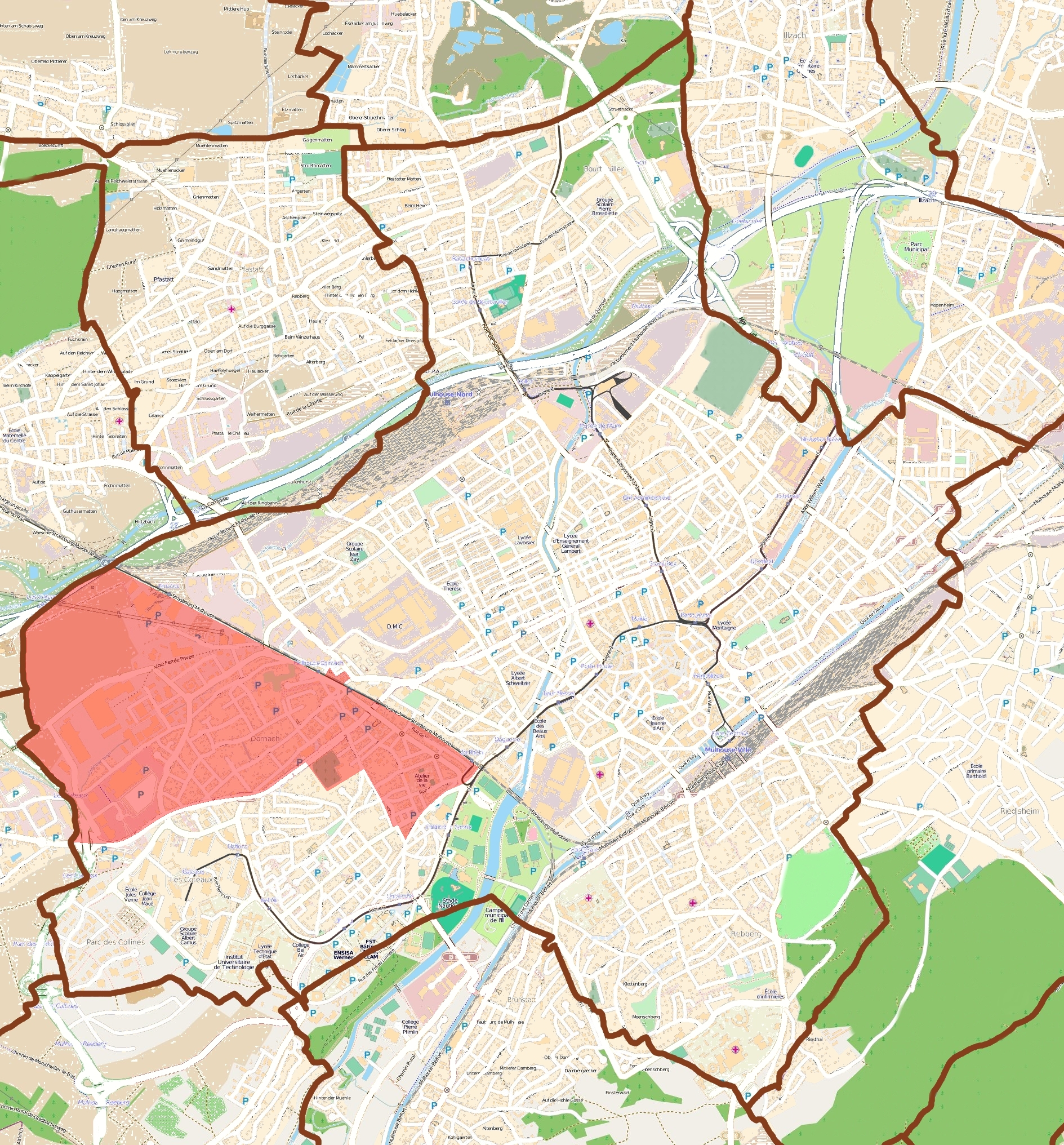
- Location of the district in Mulhouse.

- Coordinates: 47°44′50″N 7°18′33″W

Population
  - Total: 5,684 hab. (2,006)

Dornach is one of the main affluent residential districts of Mulhouse intra muros, bordering Morschwiller-le-Bas and Lutterbach. It is an ancient settlement that owes its name to the Celts, a name that the Romans later Latinized into Durnacum and Germanized into Dornach. Dornach was once an autonomous commune, and for a long time served as a border village between the independent Republic of Mulhouse and Upper Alsace (of which it was a part), which was alternately under French and German rule. As such, it was home to the local Jewish and Catholic bourgeoisie, who could not stay in the territory of the Republic of Mulhouse due to the adoption of the exclusive Calvinist religion.

In 1908, under the German Empire, the town, whose population had grown strongly in the 19th century thanks to industrial development, asked to be merged with Mulhouse, as it couldn't solve the problems associated with urban development. The merger took effect in 1914, the year the district was the scene of the Battle of Dornach. The former Dornach industrial district of Brustlein became a fully-fledged Mulhouse district, while the Daguerre district, previously located in both communes, was unified, and the City of Mulhouse used the undeveloped parts of the commune to build the Haut-Poirier district (Illberg and Bel Air) and the Coteaux district. The former village area the west of the Strasbourg → Basel railroad line, located between the Dornach fairgrounds and the commune of Lutterbach, became the Mulhouse district of Dornach, which took on its current boundaries.

At the start of the 21st century, Dornach retains its village-style urban layout, making it an attractive residential area. The proximity of a large peripheral shopping area, two university campuses and two business parks, combined with motorway and rail links (Zu-Rhein, Mulhouse-Dornach and Musées stations) and the presence of the tramway (Line 3, Mulhouse Vallée de la Thur tram-train) further enhance this appeal. The late 20th and early 21st centuries were marked by the development of the ever-expanding Mulhouse Technology Crescent to the north, south, and west of the district.

== Geography ==
The Dornach district lies to the west of Mulhouse. A tributary of the Dollar River, the Steinbaechlein, runs through the district, having been canalized in the 19th century when the area was industrialized.

=== Transport ===
The district is served by the Mulhouse-Dornach train station and by public transport in the Mulhouse area.

=== Toponymy ===
Alsatian: Durni. Derived from Turnach (1250) from the Gallo-Roman etymon Turnacum, meaning “where there is a rise in the ground”. This word has the same etymology as Tournay and Tournai (Doornik) in Belgium.

== History ==
=== Prehistory ===
Evidence of Dornach's occupation dates back to the Neolithic period, with carved flints and axes discovered at the foot of the Illberg. Remains from the Hallstatt and La Tène periods include tombs, Vilannovian fibulae, Gallic coins, and other objects. The Romans Latinized the name Durnachos to Durnacum or Turnacum. During major invasions, the area was occupied by the Alamanni and Franks, who Germanized the name to Turnich, Durnich, Durnach, and finally Dornach.

=== Middle Ages ===
In the Middle Ages, the village of Dornach belonged to the abbey of Murbach, which gave it in fief to a noble family taking the name of Dornach.

=== Renaissance ===
At the beginning of the 15th century, the de Dornach family died out. The sole heiress, Vérène, married Hertrich II Zu Rhein. The fiefdom of Dornach remained in the hands of the Zu Rheins until the French Revolution. The Thirty Years' War decimated the village, which fell from 200 inhabitants at the start of the conflict to 18 or 20 by the end of the war. When peace was signed, Dornach was repopulated.

=== In the 19th century ===
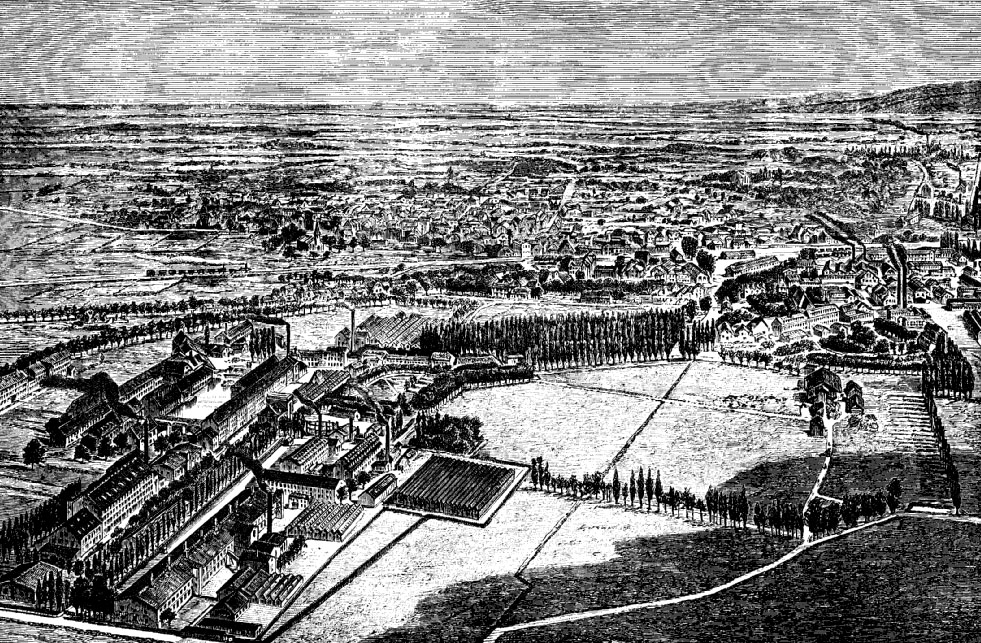
The Dollfus-Mieg factory in the 19th century.

Mulhouse's first industrialization soon had an impact on the village. It was in Dornach that the first steam engine was installed in 1812. Along the Steinbaechlein, textile factories set up shop: Blech-Fries, DollfusMieg et Cie, Hofer and Schlumberger, Thierry-Mieg au Brustlein. Louis René Villermé visits Dornach to write Tableau de l'état physique et moral des ouvriers employés dans les manufactures de coton, de laine et de soie, published in 1840. In it, he describes the working conditions of workers in the commune's factories.

“In Mulhouse, in Dornach, work started at five in the morning and finished at five in the evening, summer and winter alike. [...] You have to see them arriving in town every morning and leaving every evening. Among them are a multitude of pale, skinny women, walking barefoot in the middle of the mud who, for want of umbrellas, wear their aprons or petticoats over their heads when it rains or snows, to protect their faces and necks, and a larger number of young children, no less dirty, no less pale, covered in rags, all greasy with the oil from the looms that falls on them while they work. The latter, better protected from the rain by the impermeability of their clothes, don't even carry on their arms, like the women just mentioned, a basket containing the day's provisions; but they do carry in their hands, or hide under their jackets as best they can, the morsel of bread that must feed them until the time they return home.”

He also describes the workers' lodgings: “I saw in Mulhouse, Dornach and neighboring houses, miserable dwellings where two families each slept in a corner, on straw thrown on the floor and held together by two boards.... The misery in which the workers in the cotton industry in the Haut-Rhin department live is so profound that it produces the sad result that, while in the families of manufacturers, merchants, drapers, and factory managers, half of the children reach the age of twenty-one, this same half ceases to exist before the age of two in the families of weavers and cotton mill workers."

Adolphe Braun's photographic company was founded in Dornach in 1853. It became an industrial establishment in 1862. Its reputation soon spread around the world, thanks to reproductions of works of art housed in the major museums of Europe. The population grew rapidly: 160 in 1764, 500 in 1789, 900 in 1813, 3,000 in 1851, 11,234 in 1913.

=== In the 20th century ===
On August 19, 1914, Dornach, the new district of Mulhouse, was at the heart of one of the first battles of the World War I. On August 8, according to Plan XVII, French troops entered Mulhouse. But the city fell back into German hands two days later. Heavy fighting broke out in Illzach along the railway embankment. On August 18, French troops resume the offensive. The Germans and French were face to face in Dornach the following morning. The Battle of Dornach begins. The French artillery fired large numbers of shells into the houses of Dornach to support the advance of their infantry. By 5 p.m., French troops had taken possession of Mulhouse. Hundreds were killed and wounded on both sides. French troops abandoned Mulhouse on August 25, 1914. During the war, the Dornach chemical factories produced asphyxiating gas for German troops. They were bombed by French aircraft in November 19158. According to the newspaper Le Miroir, 42 workers, the plant manager, and a German colonel were asphyxiated by the gases they were producing9. Served by streetcar, train, and freeway and close to major industrial areas, Dornach nevertheless retained a “village-like” urban structure, making it an attractive residential area. From the end of the 20th century onwards, it became one of Mulhouse's two main middle-class neighborhoods, attracting mainly residents from wealthier socio-professional categories.

== Religious communities ==
=== The Jewish community ===
Until 1798, Jews were forbidden to live in Mulhouse. They settled in the surrounding communes, such as Dornach. In 1798, the city's Jewish community drew up a Memorbuch. It contained prayers in memory of the victims of persecution in Germany, Austria, Bohemia, Spain, Poland and Holland. In the 19th century, the community continued to grow. A new synagogue, now abandoned, was built in 1851 to plans by Jean-Baptiste Schacre, architect for the city of Mulhouse. A special feature of the Dornach synagogue is the existence of a small pit, located between the Almémor (Note: Literally “dais”, a platform for reading the Torah (Pentateuch), the Prophets and the Scroll of Esther) and the Holy Ark (Note: Torah scroll cabinet) and filled in 1959. In June 1940, faced with the advance of the German army, many Jews fled Mulhouse and the Dornach district. The Nazis expelled those who remained in September.

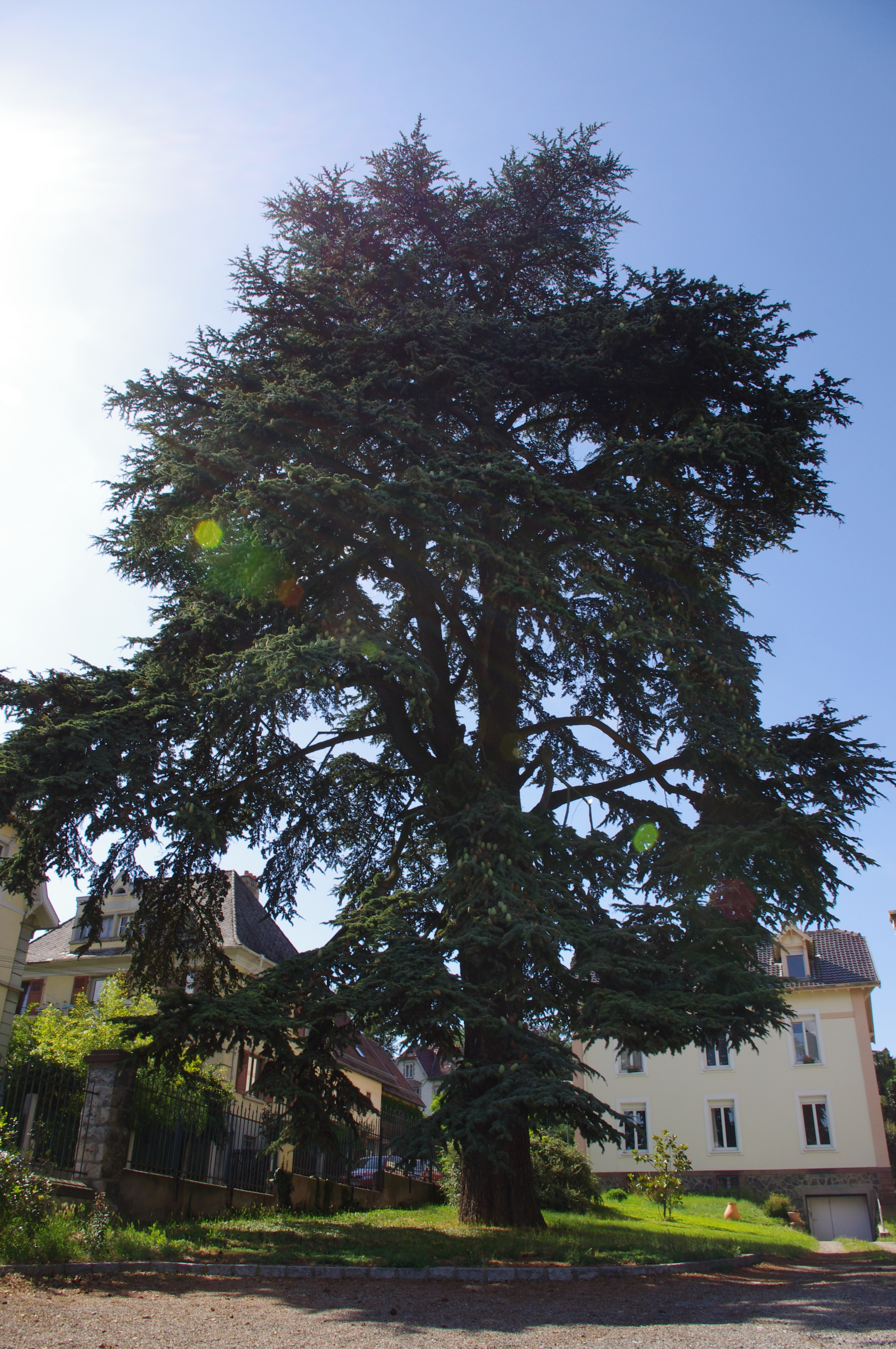
One hundred year old cedar in the garden of the Dornach temple

=== The Protestant community ===
The Dornach temple on rue Schoepflin is the place of worship for the Protestant Reformed community. The Protestant parish of Dornach includes Protestants from Dornach, Heimsbrunn, Lutterbach, Morschwiller-le-Bas, and Reiningue.

=== The Catholic community ===
The Coteaux de l'Illberg parish community supports several Catholic churches in the area, including Saint Barthélemy Church in Rue du Château Zu-Rhein.

== Demography ==
Demographic trends of Dornach

Year	Pop.	±%
1793	503	—
1800	567	+12.7%
1806	777	+37.0%
1821	1,139	+46.6%
1831	1,634	+43.5%
1836	2,706	+65.6%
1841	2,920	+7.9%

Year	Pop.	±%
1846	3,150	+7.9%
1851	2,983	−5.3%
1861	3,867	+29.6%
1866	3,981	+2.9%
1872	4,114	+3.3%
1876	4,750	+15.5%
1881	4,511	−5.0%

Year	Pop.	±%
1886	5,445	+20.7%
1891	5,655	+3.9%
1896	6,179	+9.3%
1901	7,312	+18.3%
1906	8,440	+15.4%
1911	10,447	+23.8%

Source: Ldh/EHESS/Cassini

== Major museums ==
The Cité du Train and the Musée Electropolis, two internationally renowned museums, are located in the north of the district. The former is Europe's largest railway museum, while the latter is Europe's largest museum of the history of electricity and household appliances.

In 1961, the city of Mulhouse donated land in Dornach to enable the SNCF to display rolling stock representative of its history. On October 14, 1969, the “Association du Musée Français du Chemin de Fer” was founded.

In 1992, the Electropolis Museum was created, thanks in part to EDF's sponsorship, to save the exhibition's centerpiece from destruction: a genuine working steam engine from 1901, coupled with a Sulzer-BBC alternator, a jewel in the crown of Mulhouse's technical and industrial heritage. It is 15 m long, weighs 170 tonnes of cast iron, steel, and copper, and has a 6 m diameter wheel. Between 1901 and 1947, it supplied 900 kilowatts of electricity at 400 volts to Mulhouse's historic D.M.C. industrial textile mill. A witness to the era of the first world's fairs, it took 20,000 hours of restoration work to get it up and running again every day for multimedia sound and light shows.

== Parc de la Mer Rouge ==
The Parc de la Mer Rouge is a business park created in 1984, mainly for service sector companies.

== See also ==
- Mulhouse
- Saint-Joseph Coal Mine
- Morschwiller-le-Bas
