= Arsenal de Metz =

Coordinates: 49°06′52″N 6°10′13″E

The Arsenal
- Arsenal Ney
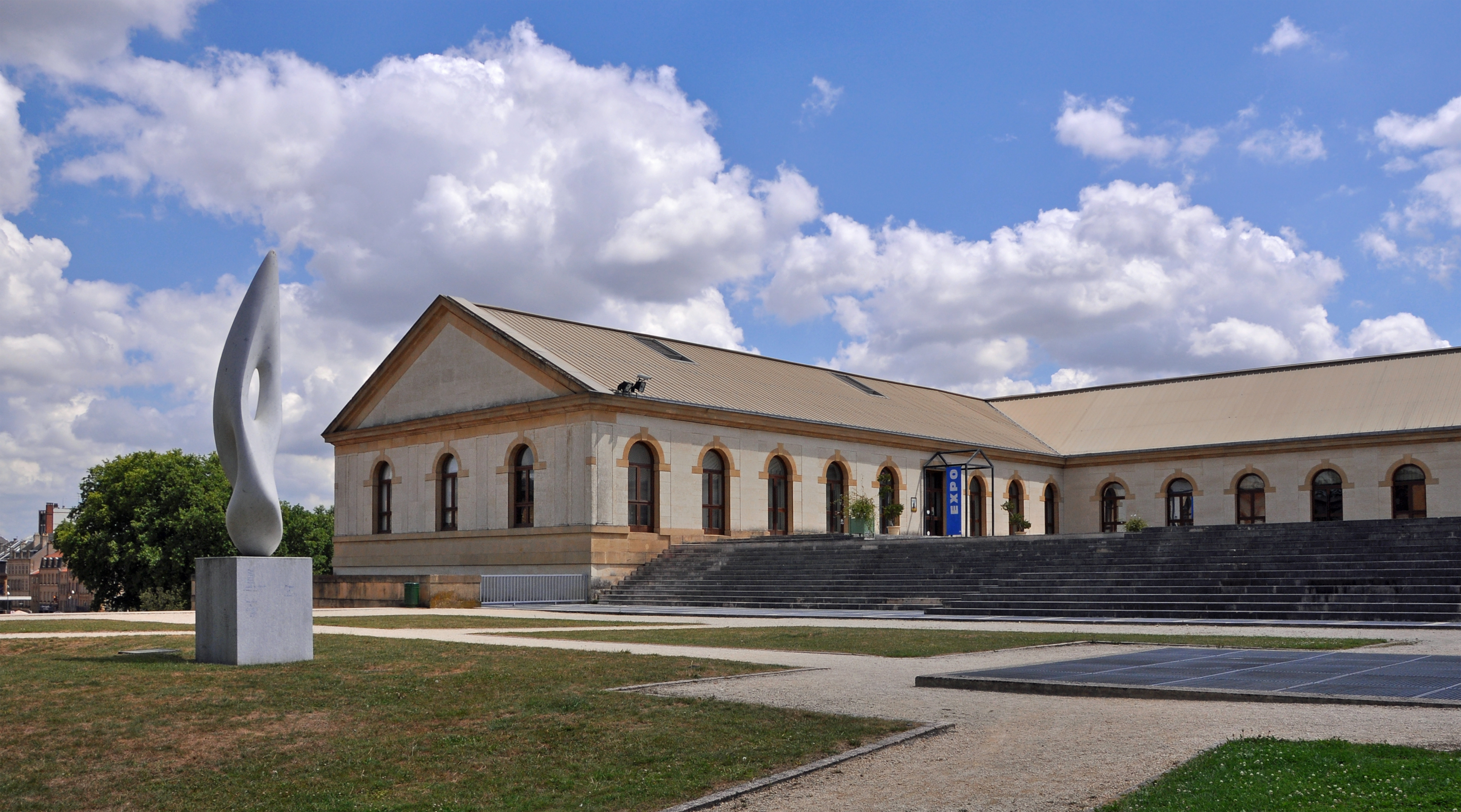
- The Arsenal on the Esplanade garden

General information
- Type: Music venue
- Architectural style: Military architecture; Post-modern
- Location: Avenue Ney, Metz, France, Europe
- Construction started: 1859
- Completed: 1864
- Inaugurated: 1989
- Owner: Municipality of Metz

Technical details
- Floor area: 10,000 m2

Design and construction
- Architect: Ricardo Bofill Taller de Arquitectura

The Arsenal Concert Hall is a cultural venue dedicated specifically to classical and art music and located near the Esplanade garden in Metz, capital of the Lorraine region, France. The Arsenal is home to the Orchestre National de Lorraine and almost 200 events are spread over the season period between September and June. The Arsenal has gained wide recognition as one of the most beautiful concert halls in the world.

The Arsenal is part of a cultural complex along with the chapel of the Knight Templars, from the 13th century, and ancient basilica of Saint-Pierre-aux-Nonnains, a Roman basilica of the 4th century, refurbished as showroom and concert hall for the Gregorian chant, respectively.

== Architecture and urbanization ==
In 1978, the municipality of Metz decided to build a concert hall, and the site chosen was the citadel, occupied by the ancient Arsenal Ney. Built beginning in 1859 under Napoleon III, the Arsenal Ney was a store for weapons and ammunition. It remained in use until the end of World War II. The realization of the concert hall was the subject of an international competition, started in 1983. In 1985, the project was awarded to the architect Ricardo Bofill. Work began in May 1987 and the inauguration took place in February 1989 with a performance by Russian cellist Mstislav Rostropovich, who stated that the venue was "an instrument of music on its own."

The arsenal was originally arranged as a quadrangle. The design by Ricardo Bofill Taller de Arquitectura removed one of its wings, opening a vast terrace in the rear which created a meeting area, available also to two other ancient buildings, Saint-Pierre-aux-Nonnains and the chapel of the Knights Templar. To preserve the regular lines of the Arsenal, most of the volume of the concert hall lies beneath the terrace created within the wings of the building. Windows open in a classic frame in Jaumont's stone surmounted by a Roman arch decorated with a stone key. Facades are faced with an Italian honey-colour stone, joints are in brass, and roofs are in lacquered bronze-like metal. The warm colors of the interior decoration with classic pilasters of beech and sycamore were chosen to evoke the use of marquetry in furniture and ancient musical instruments. For the tenth anniversary of the Arsenal's inauguration, the terrace was adorned with a sculpture, La Sentinaile, the work of Antoine Poncet.

== Size and acoustic ==
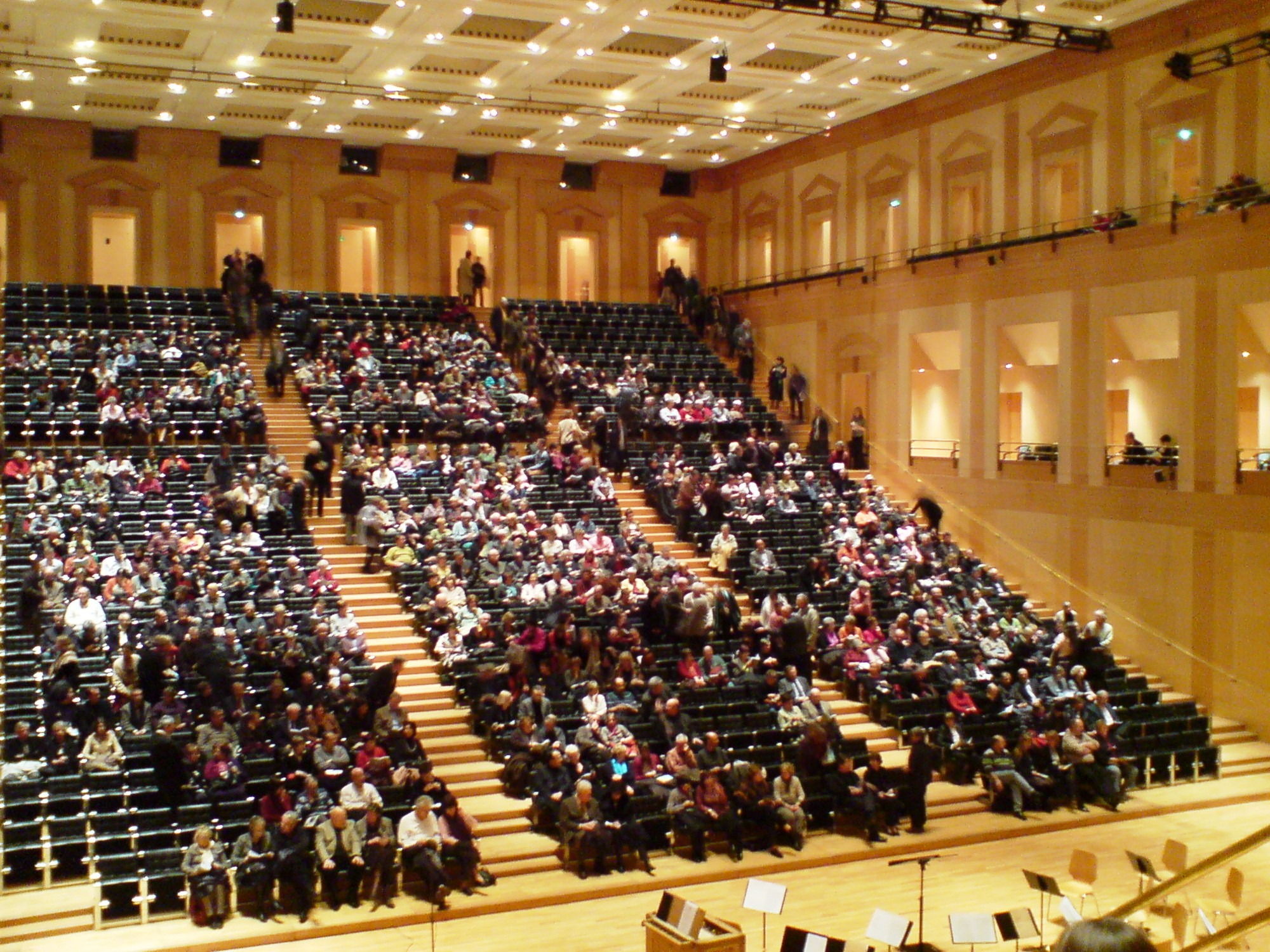
Main room.

The facility consists of a concert hall that seats 1,354 (the Grande Salle), a room with that seats 352 (the Esplanade hall), two reception rooms (Governor and Orangerie halls), an exhibition gallery, a shop selling art, and a restaurant. The volume of the room is about 13,600 cubic meters. Ceilings were established by boxes in staff finalized by the acousticians. Since its inauguration, the Arsenal has gained wide recognition for the quality of its musical acoustics.

== Performance and cultural policy ==
Numerous musicians of repute have performed in the venue, including Yevgeny Svetlanov, Sergiu Celibidache, Lorin Maazel, Evgeny Kissin, William Christie, Philippe Herreweghe, Nikolaus Harnoncourt, Jordi Savall, Philippe Jaroussky, Lang Lang, or Grigory Sokolov. Dances take equally part to the programing and emblematic figures of contemporary dance have performed there, such as Angelin Preljocaj, Sasha Waltz, Merce Cunningham, or Trisha Brown.

The music venue was used in several artistic productions, such as the soundtrack of the film, Farinelli, or the Live At the Arsenal in Metz album of Michel Petrucciani. The concert hall held in 2009 and 2020 the Victoires de la Musique Classique, the annual French award ceremony that recognizes classical musicians.

== See also ==
- List of concert halls
- List of works by Ricardo Bofill Taller de Arquitectura
