= Bells of Notre-Dame de Paris =

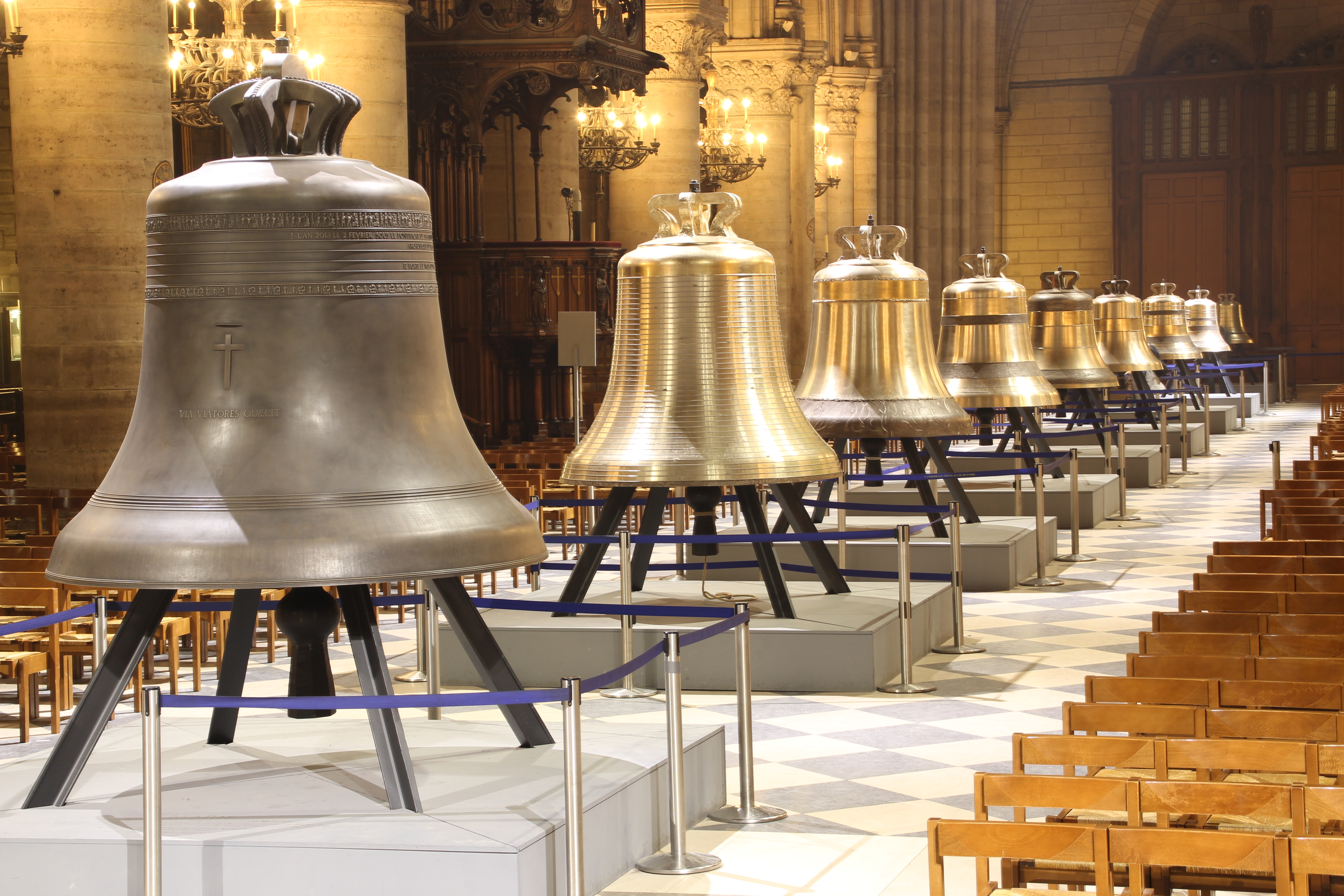
Exhibition of new bells in the nave of Notre-Dame in February 2013

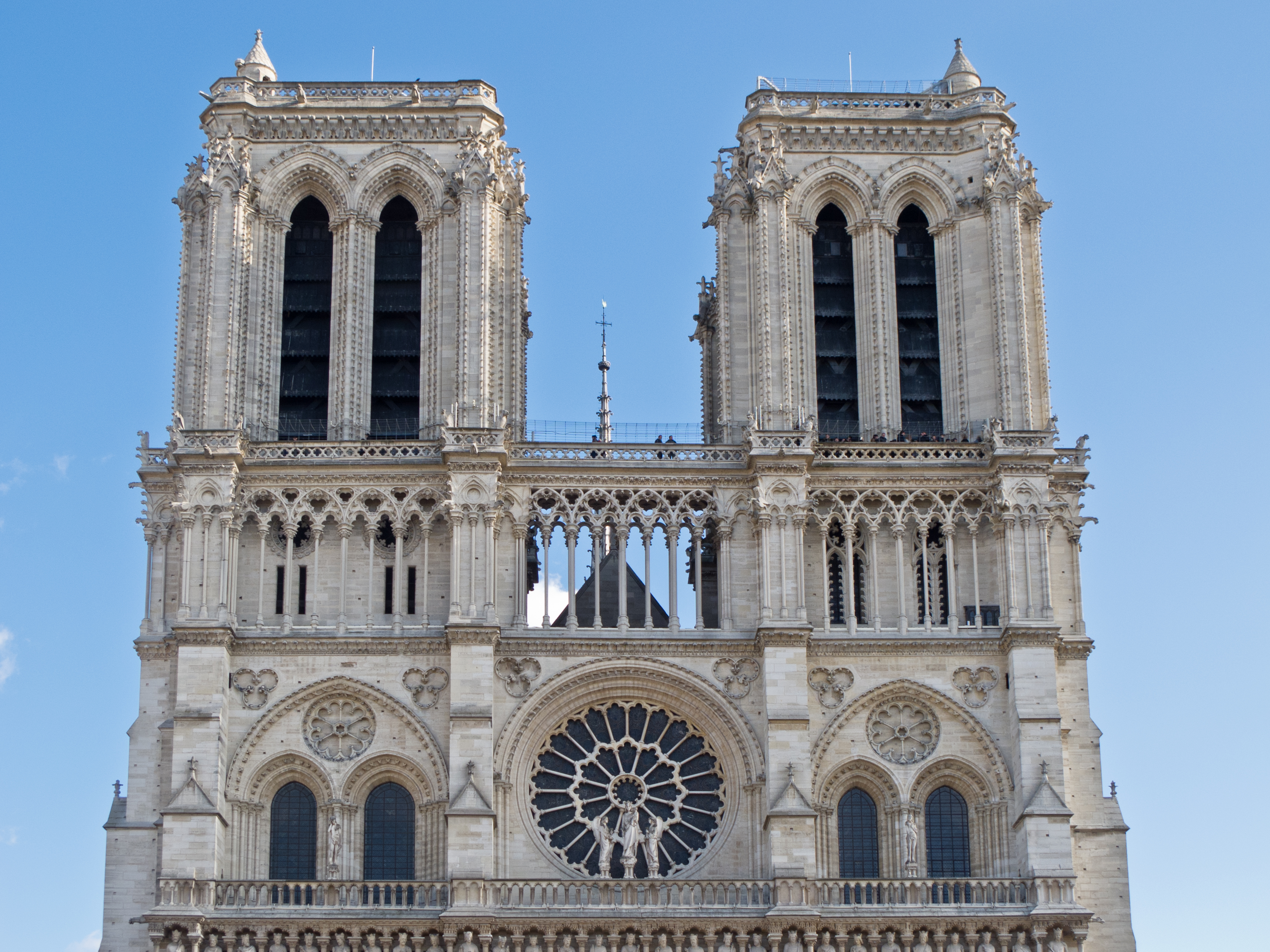
Notre-Dame's north tower (left) holds eight bells while the slightly smaller south tower (right) holds the two largest bells.

There are 13 functioning church bells in the cathedral of Notre-Dame de Paris; 10 main bells are mounted in the two main bell towers and 3 smaller bells in the sanctuary. A 14th non-ringing bell is displayed in the north tower. Notre-Dame used to have other bells in the spire, but these were destroyed in the 2019 Notre-Dame de Paris fire.

For most of the cathedral's history, the bells have been primarily used as a striking clock, to call to prayer for the Angelus, and to announce and participate in Divine Offices and special services. They have also sometimes been used as a tocsin or to commemorate historic events. As such they have become a familiar part of life in Paris, where they are known as "the cathedral's voice."

The largest, oldest, and most well-known of Notre-Dame's bells is the bourdon Emmanuel, which was cast in 1686. Emmanuel is considered by campanologists as one of Europe's finest bells and was designated a national historic landmark in 1944 when it rang during the liberation of Paris.

== Early bells ==
The earliest named bells of Notre-Dame, mentioned in 13th and 14th century records, include Marie (the bourdon), Gilbert, Guillaume, Pasquier, Chambellan, Louis, Nicholas, and Luc, all initially housed in the north tower. Historian Dany Sandron speculated that Gilbert may have been given by bishop Gilbert, the bishop of Paris from 1116 to 1123. If so, the earliest bells may have predated the cathedral itself. Bishop Eudes de Sully made the first record of bell ringing at Notre-Dame in 1198 during the construction of the cathedral. The earliest verified bell is Guillaume, donated by bishop Guillaume d'Auvergne in 1230, five years before the completion of the north tower. A total of eight bells were mounted there by 1311.

The spire, completed in about 1250, originally held a seven-bell carillon, which included la Pugnaise, a bell used to signal the bell ringer in the main towers, and the chapter bell la Clopette, used to announce gatherings of the cathedral chapter. During the Middle Ages, the carillon accompanied Notre-Dame's main bells, as did the bells of several surrounding buildings, such as the cloister and Saint-Denis-du-Pas to the east, the episcopal palace to the south, and the Hôtel-Dieu and Saint-Christophe to the west.

In 1400, Jean de Montaigu, an advisor to the king, donated a new larger bourdon which he named Jacqueline after his wife Jacqueline de la Grange. It was not initially hung in the church, possibly because of its great weight and the poor condition of the north belfry at the time. Between 1403 and 1407, a new belfry was built in the south tower, which had remained empty since its construction in 1250. Jacqueline was hung in the new belfry, and in 1414, some of the north tower bells were temporarily hung there as well while repairs were made to the north belfry. Between 1378 and 1480, the two bourdons Marie and Jacqueline were recast a combined 10 times. By 1430, Marie was the larger bell and was permanently moved to the south tower, mounted beside Jacqueline.

In 1453, Thibault de Vitry, counselor of the Parlement of Paris, donated Thibault and in 1472, Canon Jean Hue donated Gabriel, named after the archangel. The later replaced Gilbert as the largest bell in the north tower. Gilbert was melted down and the metal added to Marie when it was again recast later that year. Jean also first appeared in the 15th century.

In 1551, the carillon was either recast or replaced. From this point, the names of four of the carillon bells were recorded as Catherine, Magdelaine, Barbe (named after Saint Barbara), and Anne. With the addition of an unnamed fifth bell, La Pugnaise, and La Clopette, the spire held seven bells in 1612, but by 1763 this was reduced to six.

When Jacqueline broke in 1680, the chapter decided to recast the bell with about twice its original mass. It was also decided to rename the bell Emmanuel (first spelled "Emanuel") in honour of a chaplain by that name who financed the project. It was also felt that the new name held more religious significance. Cordelier friar Jean Thibault recast the bell that year, but this bell was deemed unsuccessful and was never mounted in the church.

In 1681, four master-founders collaborated to recast the bell—Nicolas Chapelle, Jean Gillot, François Moreau, and Florentin le Guay. The work was carried out on the Terrain, an open space of land on the eastern end of the Île de la Cité, near where Square Jean-XXIII and the Deportation Memorial are located today. The bell was cast on 31 October and removed from its mould and rung for the first time on 20 November. It was brought into the cathedral through the north portal where the trumeau had to be removed so the bell could fit through. The bell's baptism was held on 29 April 1682, officiated by archbishop François de Harlay de Champvallon. The chapter invited the king and queen, Louis XIV and Maria Theresa, to serve as the bell's godparents. It was mounted in the south tower next to Marie on 14 July.

Shortly later, the chapter later asked the founders to remake the bell, believing it to be improperly tuned. When the founders refused, the chapter sued them in 1684. An initial trial, held at the Grand Châtelet, found them not liable, but this was later overturned by the Parlement of Paris. This third version of the bell was named Emmanuel-Louise-Thérèse to include the names of its godparents. This was in particular meant to memorialize Maria Theresa who had died in 1683. The queen's name was also added to the inscription. Emmanuel was completed in 1686 (evidently behind schedule, as the inscription reads "made in 1685"). This is the bell which has survived to the present day, and is renowned for both its history and musical quality. Emmanuel was the largest bell in France until 1891 when La Savoyarde was cast for the Sacré-Cœur.

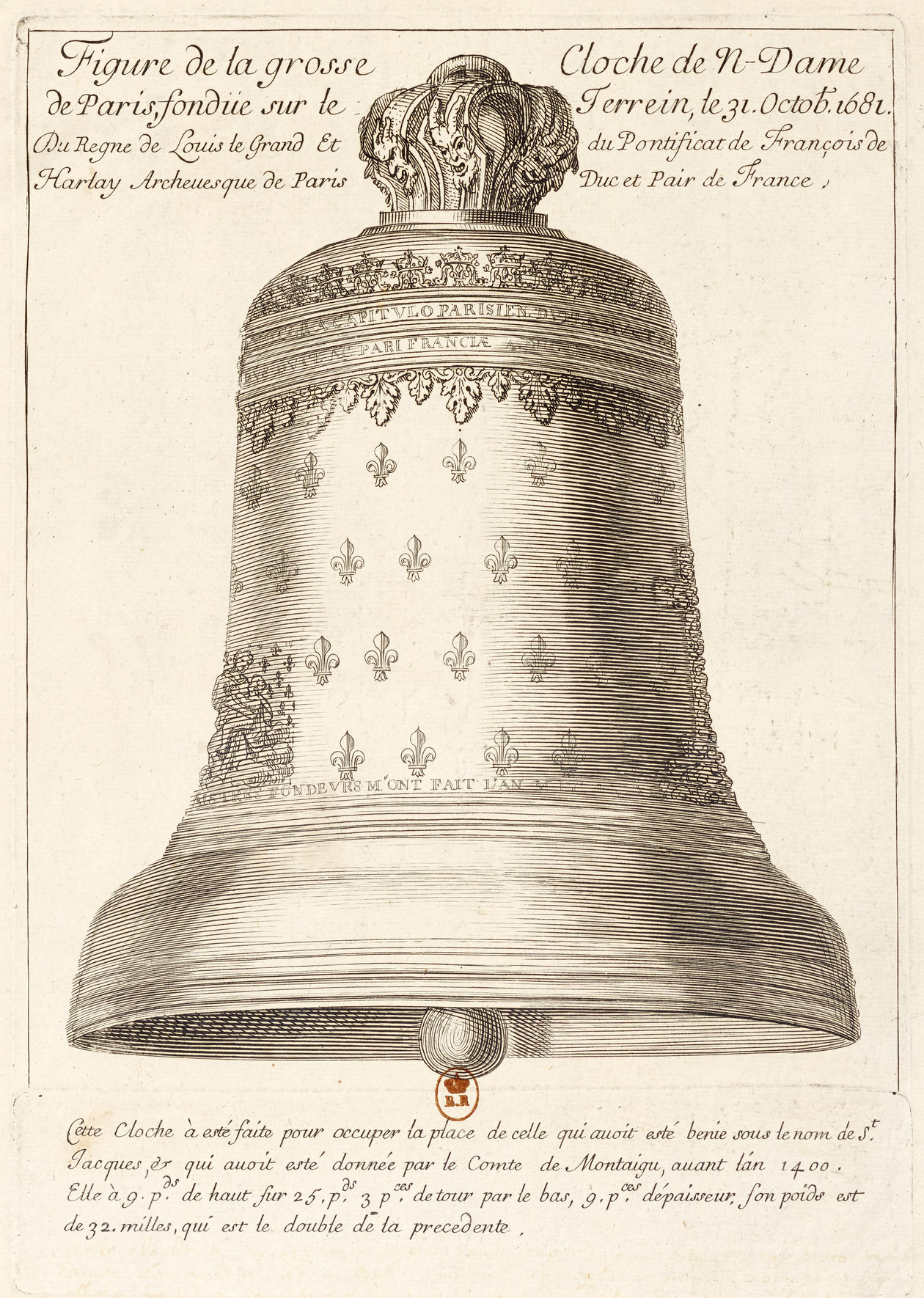
The second version of Emanuel, cast in 1681

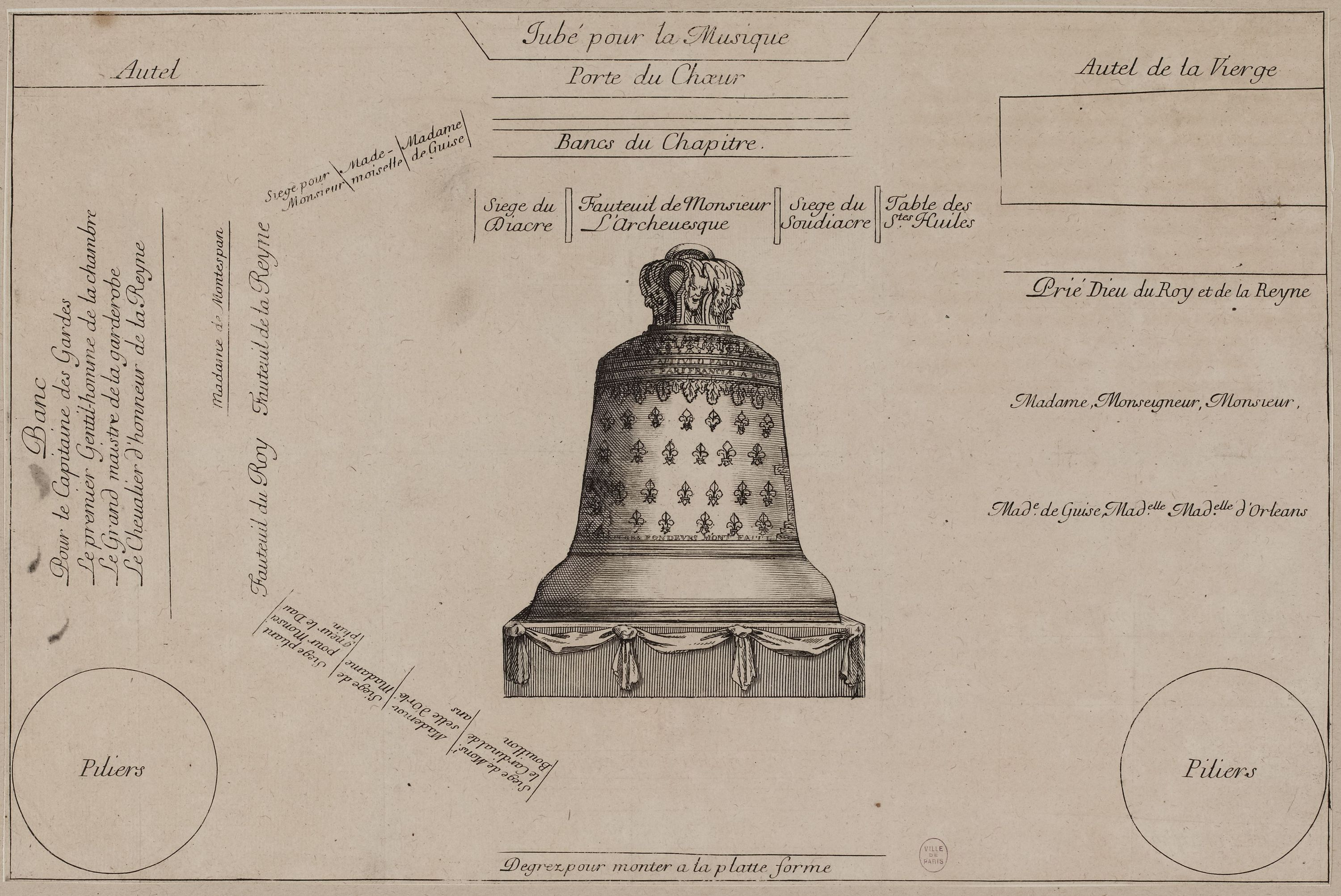
VIP seating arrangements at the 1682 baptism for Emanuel. The bell is situated at the crossing with the jubé at the top of the image. Armchairs for the king and queen are to the left towards the north transept.

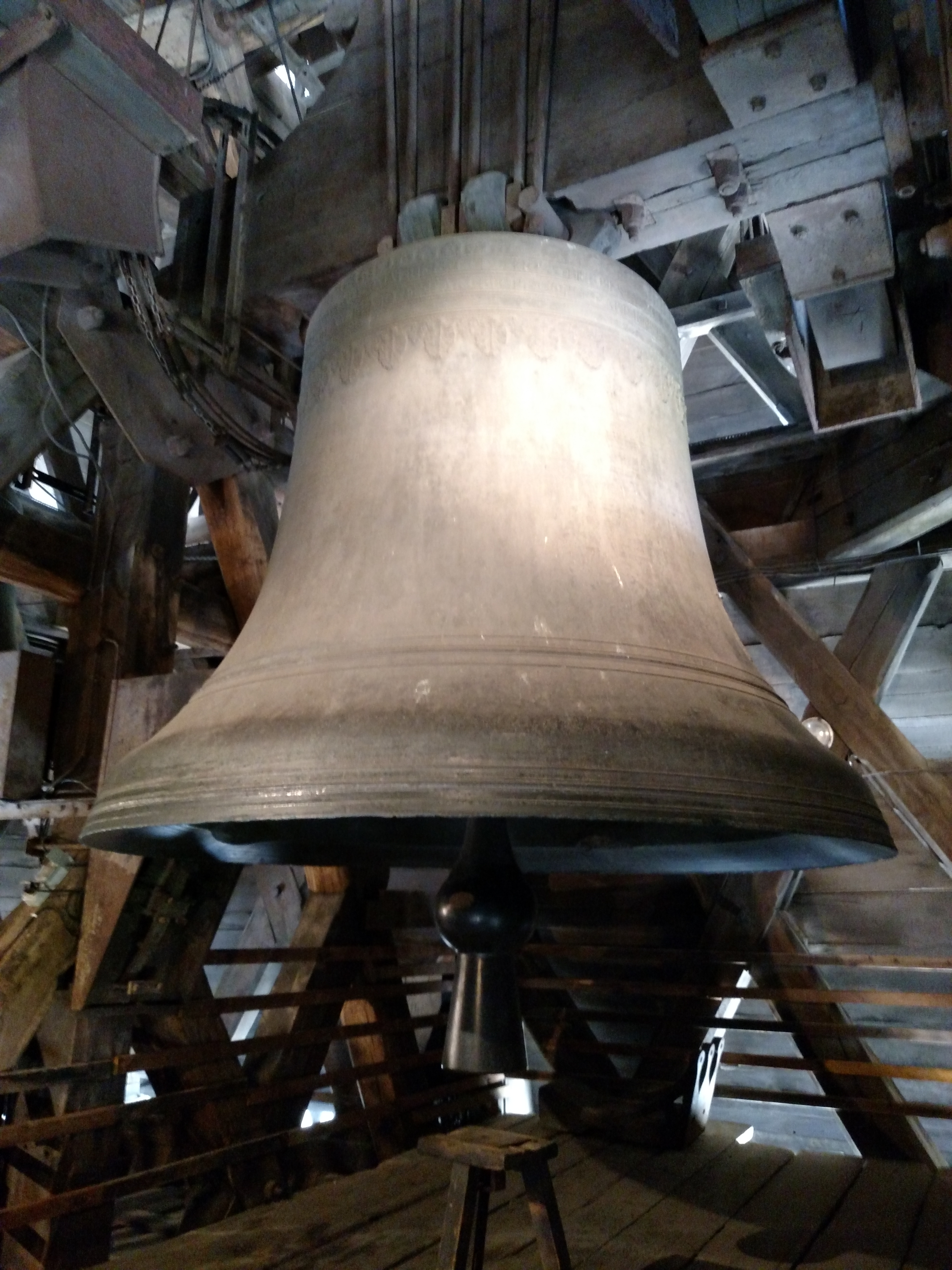
Emmanuel-Louise-Thérèse, cast in 1686

External audio
- Projet Cloche
- Digital recreation of the sound of Notre-Dame's bells from 1769 to 1791, 31 January 2012, retrieved 18 January 2021

Most of the north tower bells were recast in the 18th century. Claude is first mentioned in 1711, although it likely originated earlier. In 1766, three dedicated clock bells were installed in one of the north transept's turrets. François was added to the north tower in 1769.

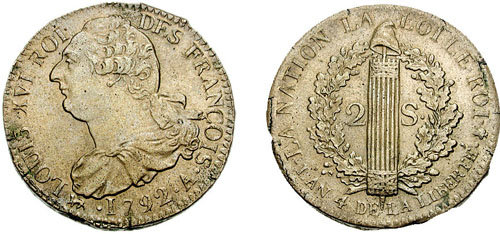
1792 French double sou minted from bell metal. "These eight bells [...] circulate today by indefinite fractions in the hands of the public." —Antoine-Pierre-Marie Gilbert

During the French Revolution, about 80% of church bells throughout the country were melted down, or almost 100,000 bells. Despite the widespread iconoclasm of the era which affected many of Notre-Dame's statues, the melting of bells was more a pragmatic decision based on the need for cheap raw materials at the time. The National Constituent Assembly had confiscated all church property in 1789 and began to melt down Parisian church bells in 1790. Between May 1791 and August 1792, Marie, Gabriel, Guillaume, Pasquier, Thibault, Jean, Claude, Nicholas, and Françoise were removed, broken apart, and melted down. The metal would be used for coins and cannons. The only bells to survive were the three clock bells and Emmanuel. The latter was rung for the Festival of Reason in 1793 before being taken down and put into storage in 1794.

It was also during the Revolution that the original spire was taken down along with its carillon, although this was not related to the events of the Revolution.

=== List of bells (1769) ===
Location	No.	Name	Year cast	Mass	Diameter	Tone	Year removed
South tower	1	Emmanuel	1686	about 13,000 kg	2.61 m	F♯_{2}	1794
South tower	2	Marie	1472	11,258 kg	2.4 m	G♯_{2}	1792
North tower	3	Gabriel	1641	4,332 kg	1.89 m	A♯_{2}	1791–92
North tower	4	Guillaume	1769	3,524 kg	1.71 m	B_{2}	1791–92
North tower	5	Pasquier	1765	2,643 kg	1.55 m	C♯_{3}	1791–92
North tower	6	Thibault	1764	2,048 kg	1.41 m	D♯_{3}	1791–92
North tower	7	Jean	1769	1,530 kg	1.26 m	E♯_{3}	1791–92
North tower	8	Claude	1714	979 kg	1.13 m	F♯_{3}	1791–92
North tower	9	Nicolas	1714	744 kg	95 cm	G♯_{3}	1791–92
North tower	10	François	1769	587 kg	99.7 cm	A♯_{3}	1791–92
Spire	11	Catherine	1551	254 kg		B_{3}	1792
Spire	12	Magdelaine	1551	195 kg		C♯_{4}	1792
Spire	13	Barbe	1551	146 kg		D_{4}	1792
Spire	14	Anne	1551	91 kg		E_{4}	1792
Spire	15	Pugnèse	by 1283	25 kg		C♯_{5}	1792
Spire	16	La Clopette					1792
North transept	17	clock bells	1766	1,905 kg		~C_{3}	1856
North transept	18	clock bells	1766	566 kg		G_{3}	1856
North transept	19	clock bells	1766	412 kg		A_{3}	1856

=== Inscriptions of Emmanuel ===
The upper inscriptions were written in Latin; the lower inscriptions were written in French with some Middle French spellings.

1681 inscription:

QVÆ PRIVS IACQVELINA IOANNIS DE MONTE ACVTO COMITIS DONVM POND. XV. M. NVNC EMANVEL VOCOR, A CAPITVLO PARISIEN. DVPLO AVCTA. REGNANTE LVDOVICO MAGNO. SEDENTE FRANCISCO HARLÆO PRIMO EX ARCHIEPISCOPIS PARISIENSIBVS DVCE AC PARI FRANCIÆ. A. DNI. M. DC. LXXXI.

NICOLAS CHAPELLE, IEAN GILLOT, FRANÇOIS MOREAV, ET FLORENTIN LE GVAY, TOVS MAISTRES FONDEVRS M'ONT FAIT L'AN M. DC. LXXXI.

Translation:

[I am] what was first Jacqueline, Jean de Montaigu the count's gift of 15,000 pounds, now Emanuel I am named by the Parisian chapter, enlarged by double, during the reign of Louis the Great and the tenure of François de Harlay, first of the archbishops of Paris [to hold the title] duke and peer of France, AD 1681.

Nicolas Chapelle, Jean Gillot, François Moreau, and Florentin le Guay, all master-founders, have made me in the year 1681.

1686 inscription (extant):

QUÆ PRIUS IACQUELINA IOANNIS COMITIS DE MONTE ACUTO DONUM POND XV M NUNC DUPLO AUCTA EMMANUEL LUDOVICA THERESIA VOCOR A LUDOVICO MAGNO AC MARIA THERESIA EIUS CONIUGE NOMINATA ET A FRANCISCO DE HARLAY PRIMO EX ARCHIEPISCOPIS PARISIENSIBUS DUCE AC PARI FRANCIÆ BENEDICTA DIE XXIX APRILIS M DC LXXXII

FLORENTIN LE GVAY NATIF ET MAISTRE DE PARIS M'A FAICTE—N CHAPELLE J GILLOT F MOREAU M'ONT FAICT EN 1685

Translation:

[I am] what was first Jacqueline, Jean the count of Montaigu's gift of 15,000 pounds, now enlarged by double, Emmanuel-Louise-Thérèse I am named by Louis the Great and Maria Theresa his wife; and by François de Harlay, first of the archbishops of Paris [to hold the title] duke and peer of France, blessed on 29 April 1682.

Florentin le Guay, native and master [founder] of Paris, has made me.—N. Chapelle, J. Gillot, F. Moreau have made me in 1685.

== 19th century bells ==
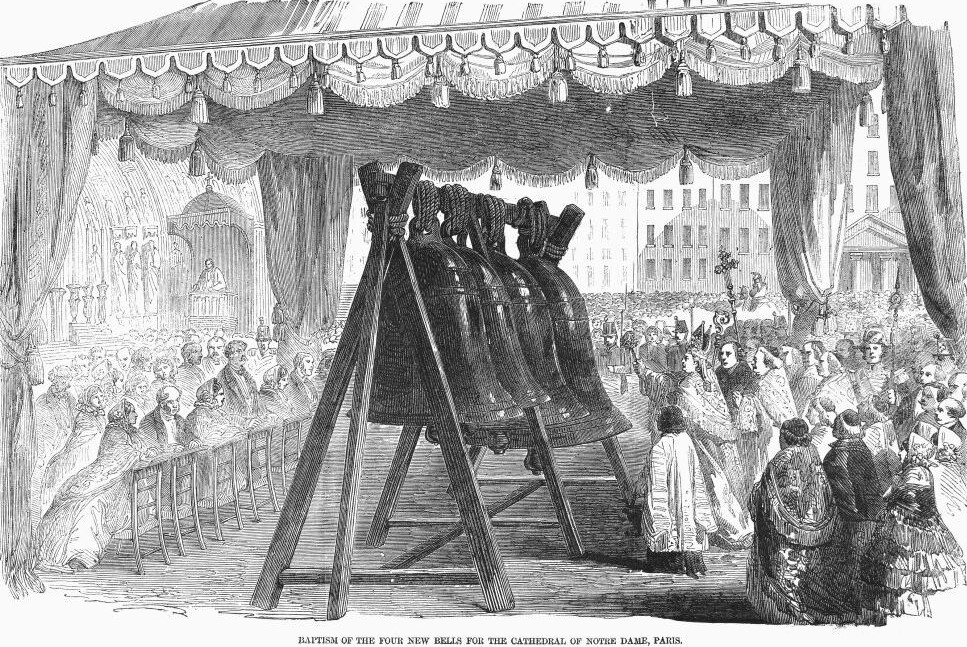
Contemporary lithograph from an English language publication of the bell benediction ceremony held in the parvis on 4 June 1856. The godparents kneel to the left while to the right Archbishop Sibour baptizes the bells with holy water.

Emmanuel, Angelique-Francoise, Antoinette-Charlotte, Hyacinthe-Jeanne, and Denise David ringing on 25 December 2011

After Napoleon Bonaparte returned the use of the cathedral to the Catholic church with the Concordat of 1801, Emmanuel was remounted in the south tower. In 1812, the three clock bells were moved from the north transept to the north tower.

In 1850 during the restoration of the cathedral, Jean-Baptiste Lassus and Eugène Viollet-le-Duc temporarily removed the bells to replace the wooden belfries.

In 1856, Napoleon III donated four new bells to celebrate his son Louis-Napoléon's baptism. The Guillaume and Besson foundry in Angers cast the bells, partially using metal from Russian bells (or cannons) captured during the Crimean War. Archbishop Sibour officiated the benediction ceremony, held in the Place du Parvis Notre-Dame on 4 June. The bells' godparents included Sibour's cousin and auxiliary Léon-François Sibour, three members of the fabric counsel, and four women related to past archbishops of Paris. The names Angelique-Francoise, Antoinette-Charlotte, Hyacinthe-Jeanne, and Denise David were derived from the names of the godfathers and archbishop relatives of the godmothers. The bells were hung in the north tower, replacing the 18th century clock bells, and were rung for the first time on 14 June, the day of the prince's baptism.

During the Crimean War, the French captured a Russian fog bell in Sevastopol and returned it to Paris as a war trophy. The French called it the Bell of Sevastopol and hung in the south tower next to Emmanuel in 1857. France returned the bell to the Russian Empire in 1913 when the two countries enjoyed closer diplomatic relations. The Russians mounted the bell by the sea in the ancient ruins of Chersonesos where it has since been known as the Bell of Chersonesos.

In 1864, three new clock bells were mounted in the upper level of the new spire. The smallest of these served as the chapter bell. In 1867, three more bells were installed directly over the crossing just behind the vaulted ceiling in the forest. These were only audible inside the cathedral.

The mediocre quality of the four 1856 bells in the north tower was noted as early as 1866 and after more than a century and a half of constant use, they only became worse. According to campanologist Régis Singer, the bells were not made of high-quality metal, were not properly tuned with each other or to the bourdon, and showed premature signs of wear. In 2011, campanologist Hervé Gouriou described them as "one of the most dreadful sets of bells in France." In 2012 they were removed and replaced with speakers in preparation for replacements the following year. The bells were originally to be melted down, but due to public interest they were preserved and put on display behind the cathedral.

=== List of bells (1867) ===
Location	No.	Image	Name	Year cast	Mass	Diameter	Tone	Year removed
South tower	1		Emmanuel	1686	about 13,000 kg	2.61 m	F♯_{2}	
South tower	2		Bell of Chersonesos	1778	5,749 kg		A♯_{2}	1913
North tower	3		Angelique-Francoise	1856	1,915 kg	1.46 m	C♯_{3}	2012
North tower	4		Antoinette-Charlotte	1856	1,335 kg	1.25 m	D♯_{3}	2012
North tower	5		Hyacinthe-Jeanne	1856	925 kg	1.11 m	F_{3}	2012
North tower	6		Denise David	1856	767 kg	1.05 m	F♯_{3}	2012
Spire	7		HF1	1864	450 kg	91.5 cm	G_{3}	2019
Spire	8		HF2	1864	250 kg	74.5 cm	B♭_{3}	2019
Spire	9		HF3 (chapter bell)	1864	130 kg	63.5 cm	D_{4}	2019
Crossing	10		HC1	1867	60 kg		A_{4}	2019
Crossing	11		HC2	1867	25 kg		C_{5}	2019
Crossing	12		HC3	1867	20 kg		D♭_{5}	2019

=== Inscriptions of 1856 bells ===
Angelique-Francoise:

illustrissime et révérendissime seigneur LEON FRANCOIS SIBOUR, evêque de tripolis, auxiliaire de monseigneur l'archevêque de paris, et PAULINE MARIE NICOLETTE de TALLEYRAND, duchesse de PERIGORD. m'ont donné les noms de ANGELIQUE-FRANCOISE. illustrissime et révérendissime père en dieu, monseigneur MARIE DOMINIQUE AUGUSTE SIBOUR, archevêque de paris, m'a bénite, et je pèse 1915 kilogrammes

Antoinette-Charlotte:

CHARLES, comte de MONTALEMBERT membre du conseil de fabrique de cette eglise metropolitaine et CHARLOTTE BERNARDINE AUGUSTE, marquist de JUIGNE née PERCIN de MONGAILLARD de la VALETTE. m'ont donné les noms de ANTOINETTE-CHARLOTTE. j'ai ete bénite par illustrissime et révérendissime père en dieu monseigneur M.D. AUGUSTE SIBOUR archevêque de paris, et je pèse 1335 kilogrammes

Hyacinthe-Jeanne

JEAN SAMUEL FERDINAND, comte de TASCHER, membre du conseil de fabrique de cette eglise metropolitaine et HENRIETTE, vicomtesse de QUELEN née de GASTALD m'ont nommé HYACINTHE-JEANNE. j'ai ete bénite par illustrissime et révérendissime père en dieu M.D. AUGUSTE SIBOUR, archevêque de paris, et je pèse 925 kilog

Denise David:

AMEDEE DAVID, marquis de PASTORET, membre du conseil de fabrique de cette eglise métropolitaine, et MARIE CAROLINE AFFRE, née JAVON, m'ont donné les noms de DENISE DAVID. illustrissime et révérendissime père en dieu monseigneur M.D. AUGUSTE SIBOUR, archevêque de paris, ma bénite, et je pèse 767 kilog

== 21st century bells ==
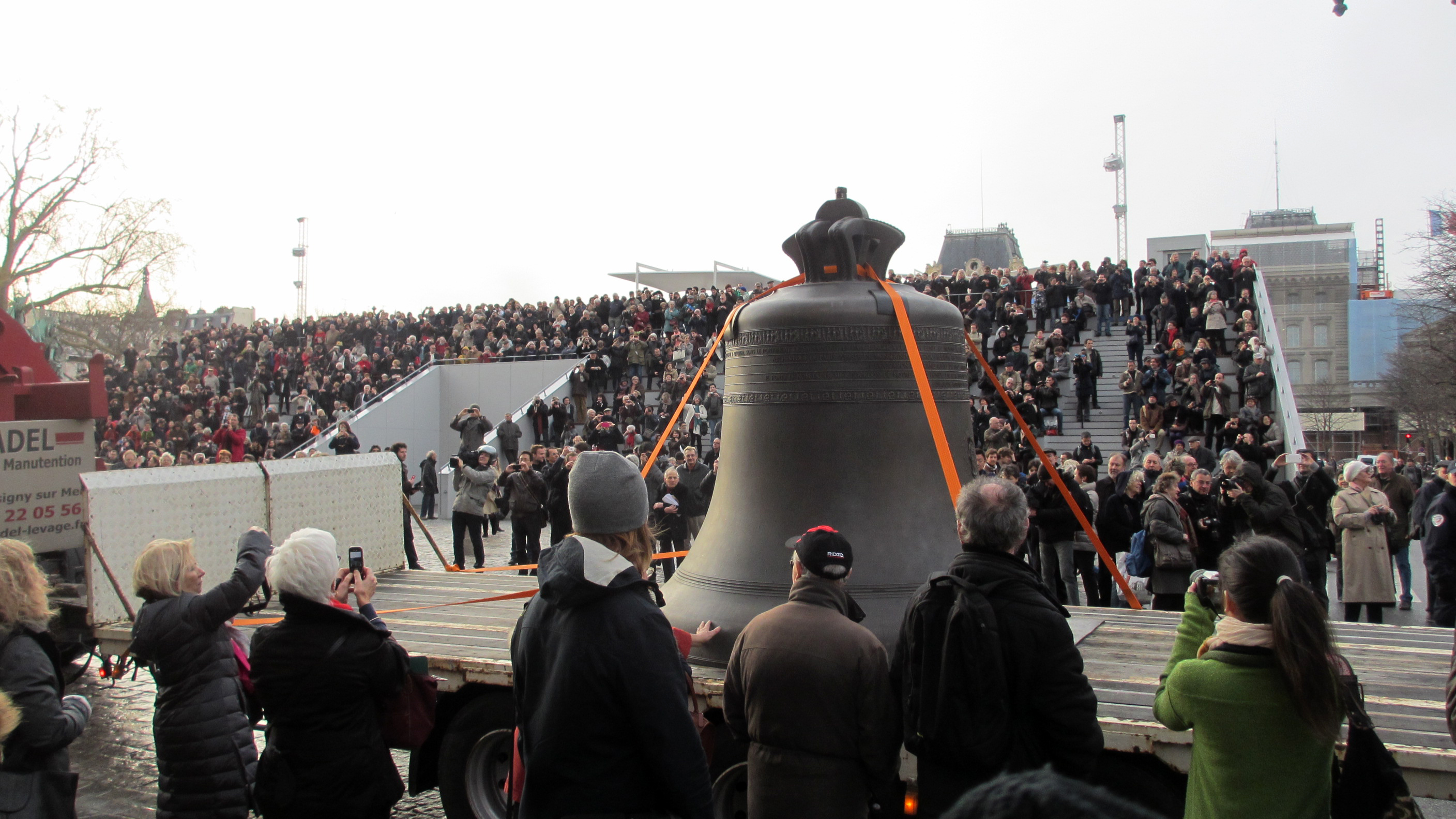
Marie arrives at Notre-Dame by truck in 2013.

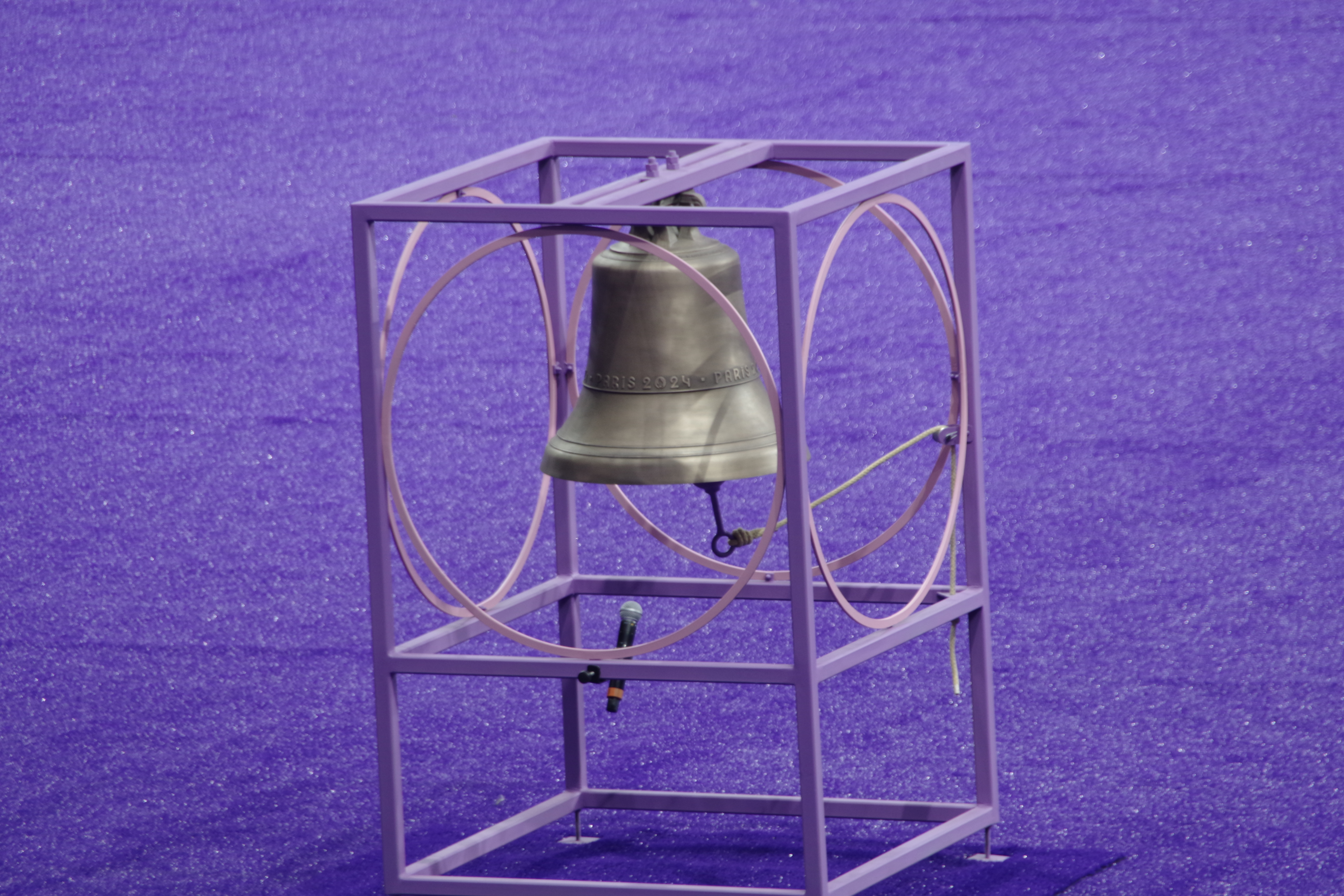
The Olympic Bell pictured at the Stade de France just prior to the 2024 Summer Olympics

In 2011, the rector-archpriest of Notre-Dame Patrick Jacquin initiated a project to restore the cathedral's bells as they were before the Revolution. About two million Euros were raised for the project in private donations. Régis Singer, a campanologist of France's Ministry of Culture, researched the pre-Revolutionary bells to discover their strike tones and mounting locations in order to restore the sound as accurately as possible. The arrival of the new bells was timed to coincide with the celebration of the cathedral's 850th anniversary in 2013.

The bells were created in 2012 over the course of several months by two bell foundries using medieval techniques. The petit bourdon for the south tower was cast at the Royal Eijsbouts bell foundry in the Netherlands, while the eight bells for the north tower were cast at the Cornille-Havard foundry in Villedieu-les-Poêles, Normandy. They were delivered to Notre-Dame on 31 January 2013 after a police escort down the Champs-Élysées.

The names Marie, Gabriel, Anne Geneviève, Denis, Marcel, Benoît-Joseph, Maurice, and Jean-Marie were chosen to honor various saints and church figures. Étienne memorialized Saint-Étienne de Paris, the 6th century basilica which preceded Notre-Dame. Archbishop Vingt-Trois officiated the benediction of the bells on 2 February in two masses. Certain prominent citizens, most of whom shared names with the bells, served as godparents. These included Maria Teresa, Grand Duchess of Luxembourg, Gabriel de Broglie, Denis Tillinac, Marcel Pérès, and Jean-Marie Duthilleul. While not present for the ceremony, Pope Benedict XVI was the honorary godfather to Benoît-Joseph. The bell's compound name includes the pope's papal and birth names. The ceremony was the largest such event recorded in the history of the diocese. The bells remained on display in the nave of Notre-Dame for the rest of the month, during which about one million visitors were able to touch the bells and view them up close. They were rung for the first time on 23 March, drawing a crowd which filled the parvis and nearby bridges. The bells are expected to last between 200 and 300 years.

The bells were of special concern during the 15 April 2019 fire. As the flames spread along the roof of the nave from the spire towards the towers, a southerly wind was threatening to spread the fire into the north tower. Firefighters feared that if the wooden belfry caught fire, the falling bells might break through the lower floors like wrecking balls and destabilize the tower. It was expected that if the tower fell, the entire cathedral could come down with it. While the fire did spread to the north tower, a team of firefighters ascended up to the tower and extinguished the fire before it caused the bells to fall. In the end, the main bells were saved, but the six smaller bells over the crossing were destroyed. A short circuit of the spire bells' electric ringing mechanism has been cited as one of several possible causes of the fire.

After the fire, regular activities were suspended at the cathedral for an extensive restoration project. The eight north tower bells were removed for cleaning and for the belfry to be partially rebuilt. Gabriel and Marcel required repair work as a result of exposure to the heat. Emmanuel continued to be rung during the restoration, but only on special occasions. These included the funeral of Jacques Chirac on 29 September 2019, the first anniversary of the fire on 15 April 2020 (also to honor those a affected by the COVID-19 pandemic according to rector-archpriest Patrick Chauvet), the death of Pope Benedict XVI on 31 December 2022, and for Easter and Christmas.

The bells were returned to the north tower in September 2024. On 7 November 2024, three new bells were baptized on the Parvis. The largest of these was the Olympic Bell which had been placed trackside at the Stade de France during the 2024 Summer Olympics and Paralympics and was rung in celebration by victorious athletes. The other two bells were named Chiara and Carlos. All three bells were made by Cornille-Havard foundry and were mounted in the choir triforium.

The next day on 8 November, the north tower bells were rung again for the first time since the fire. This was seen as a symbolic ending to the five-year-long restoration project, which will be officially completed with a ceremony on 7 December.

Since 2025, Denise David was returned to the north tower and hung dead at the bottom of the belfry. It is displayed for the tower tour, however, and is not rung with the other bells.

Namesakes of 2012 bells
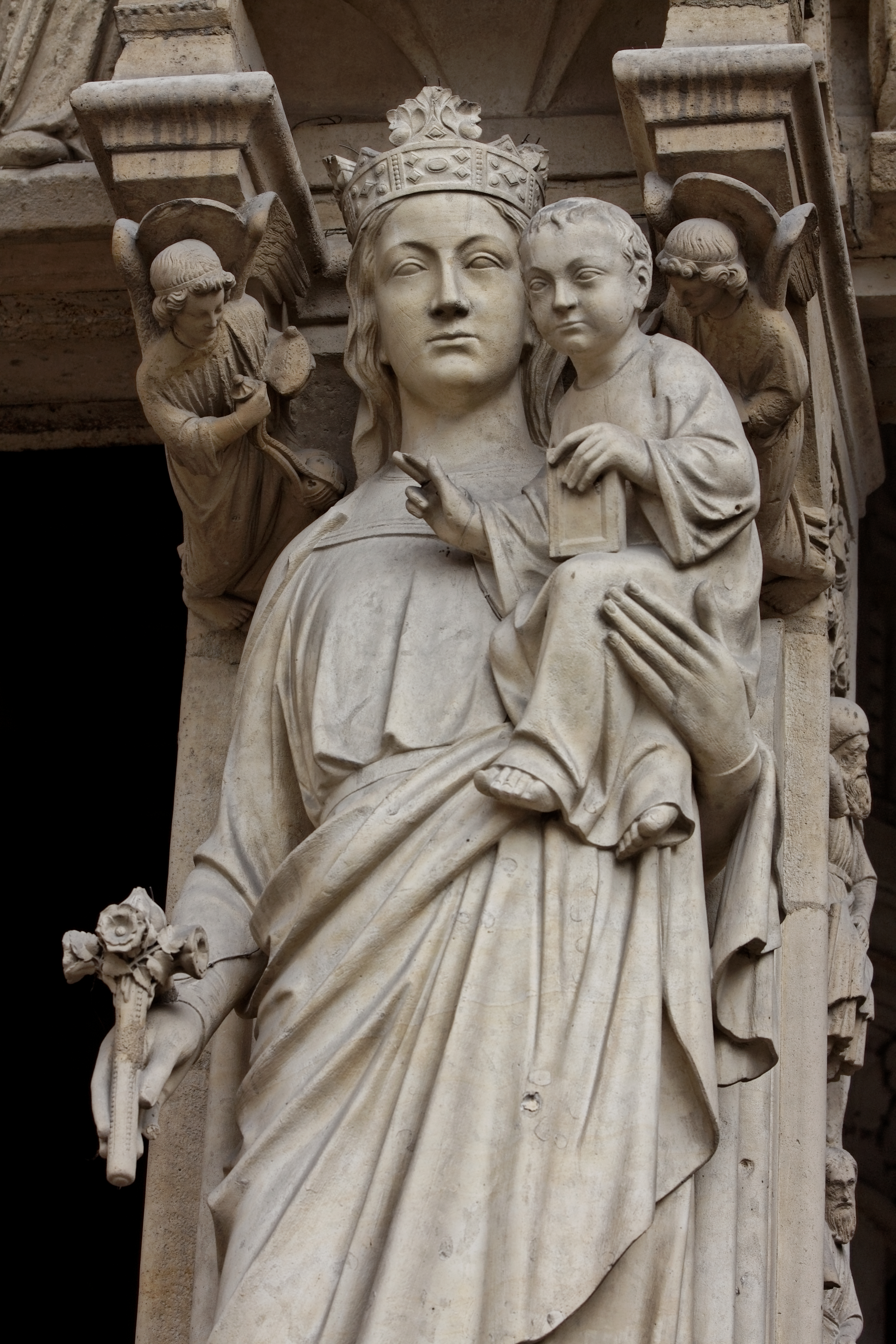
Mary, mother of Jesus

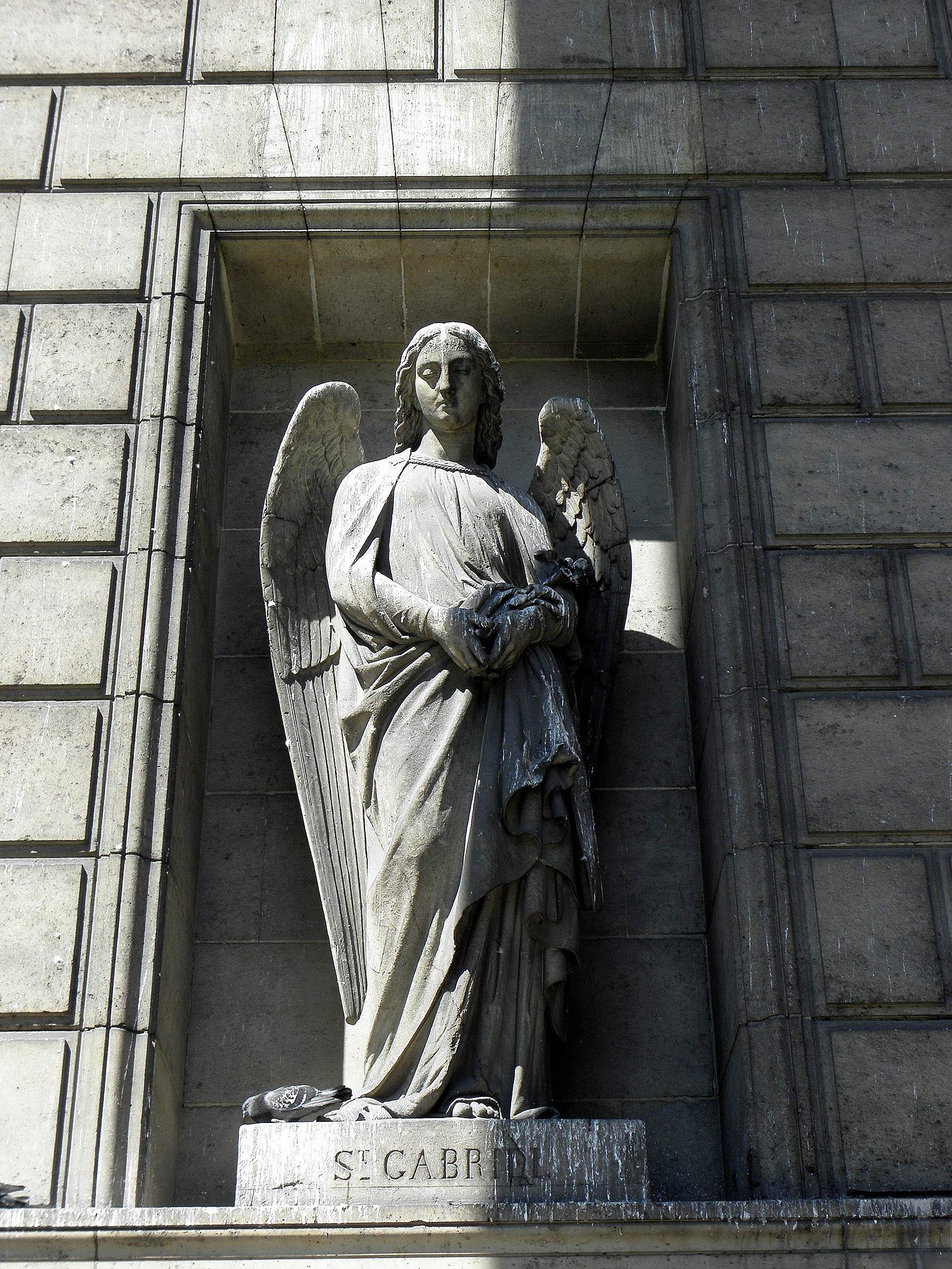
Gabriel, biblical archangel

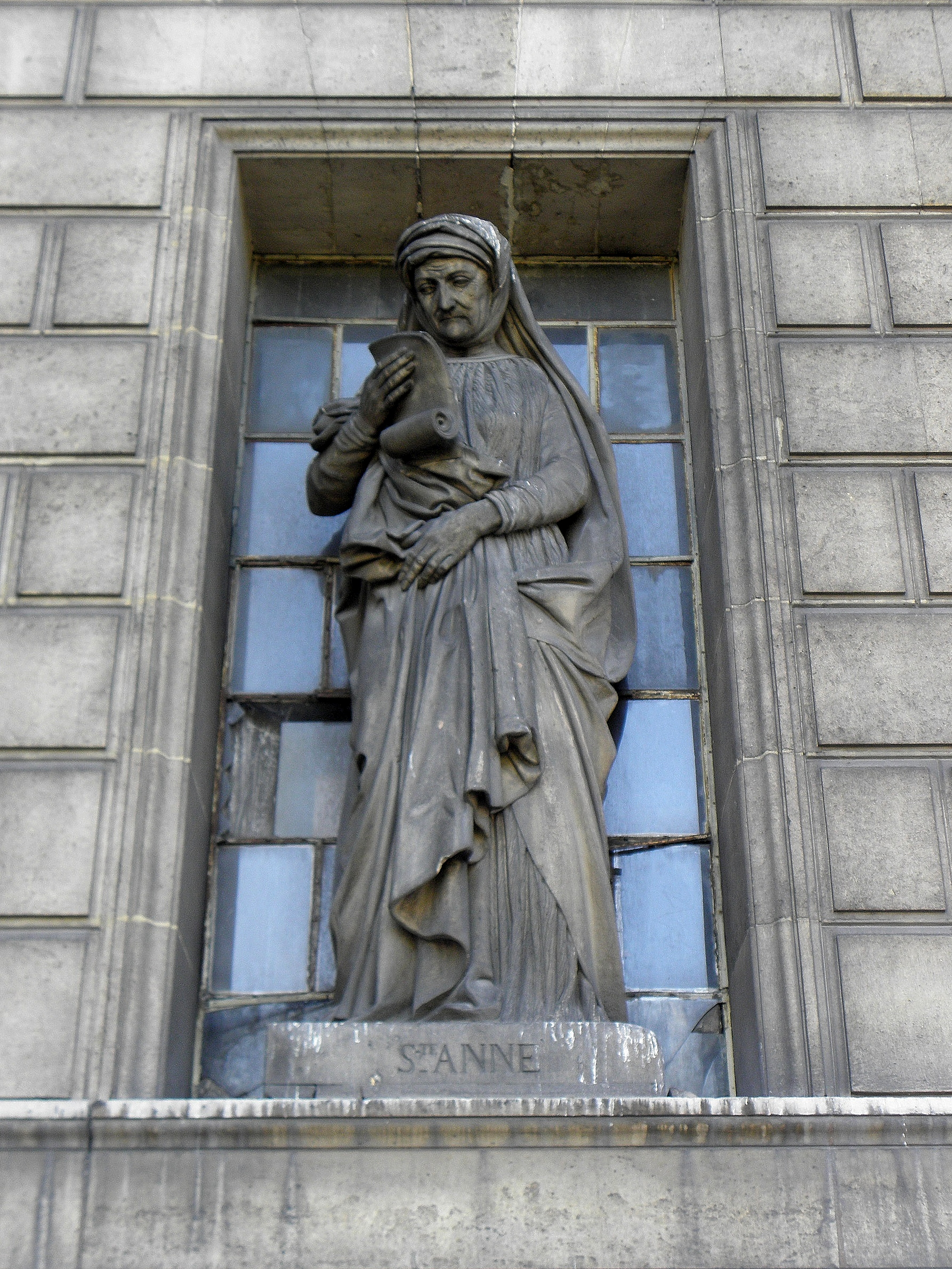
Saint Anne, mother of Mary

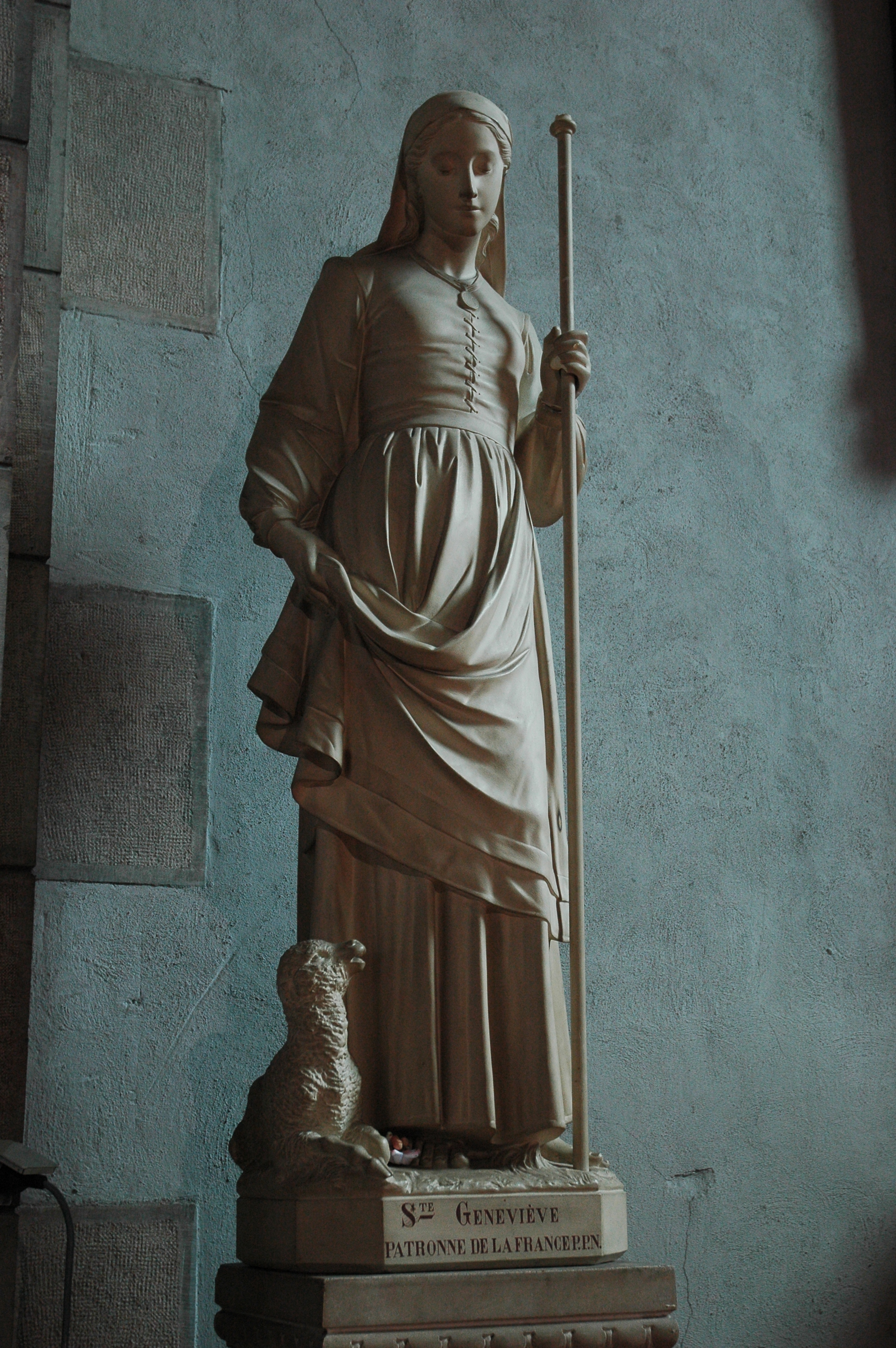
Saint Genevieve, patron saint of Paris

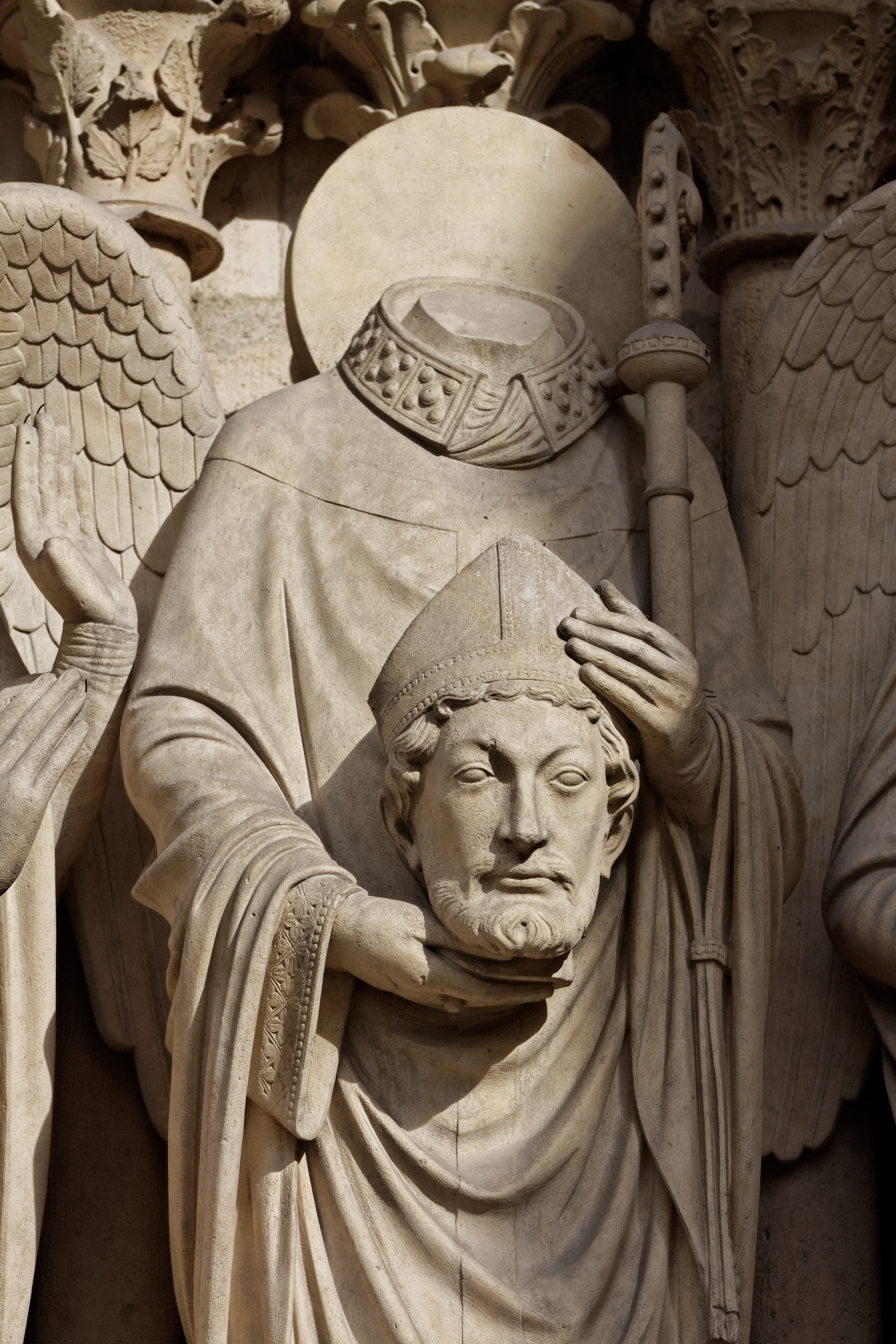
Saint Denis, 1st bishop of Paris

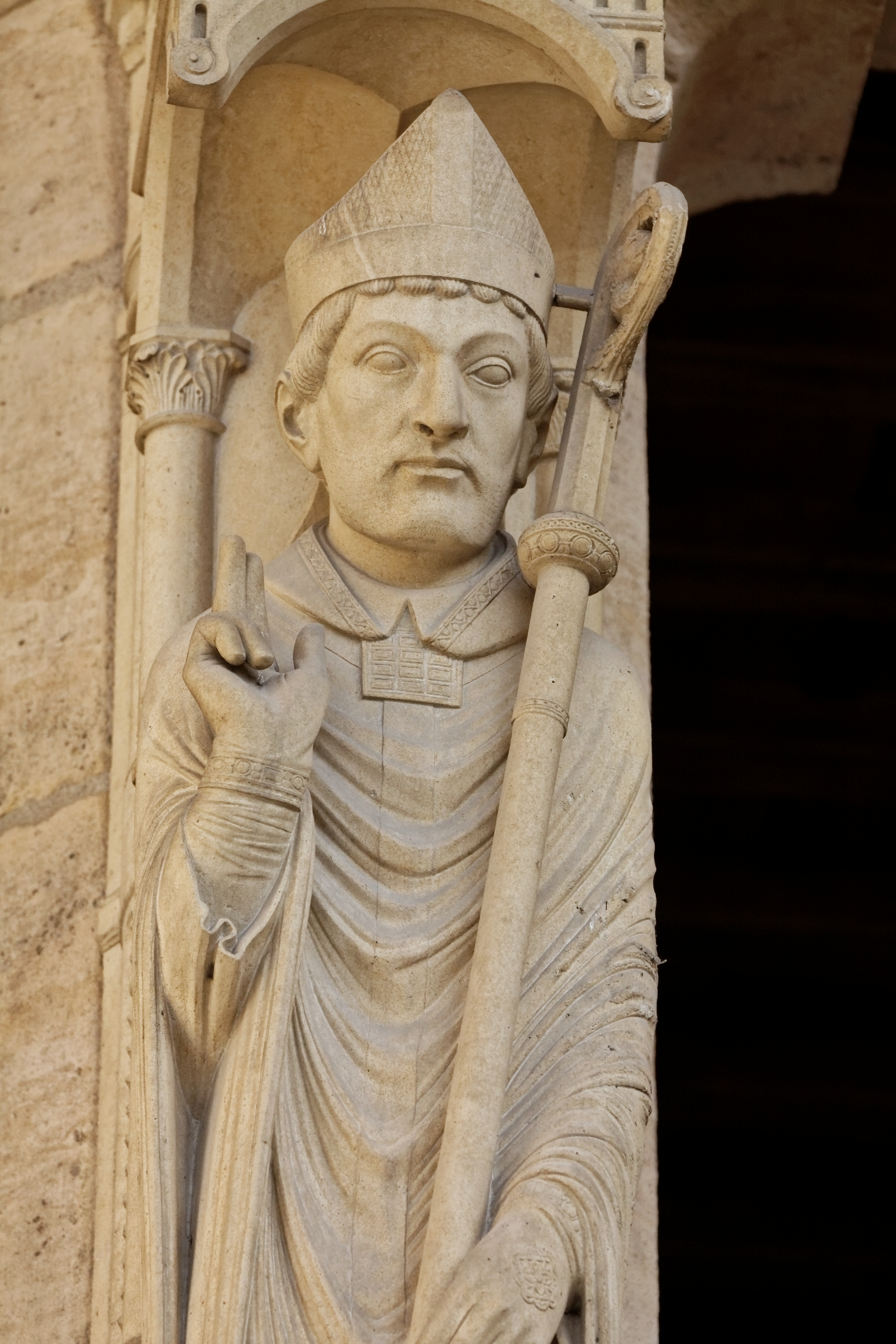
Saint Marcel, 9th bishop of Paris

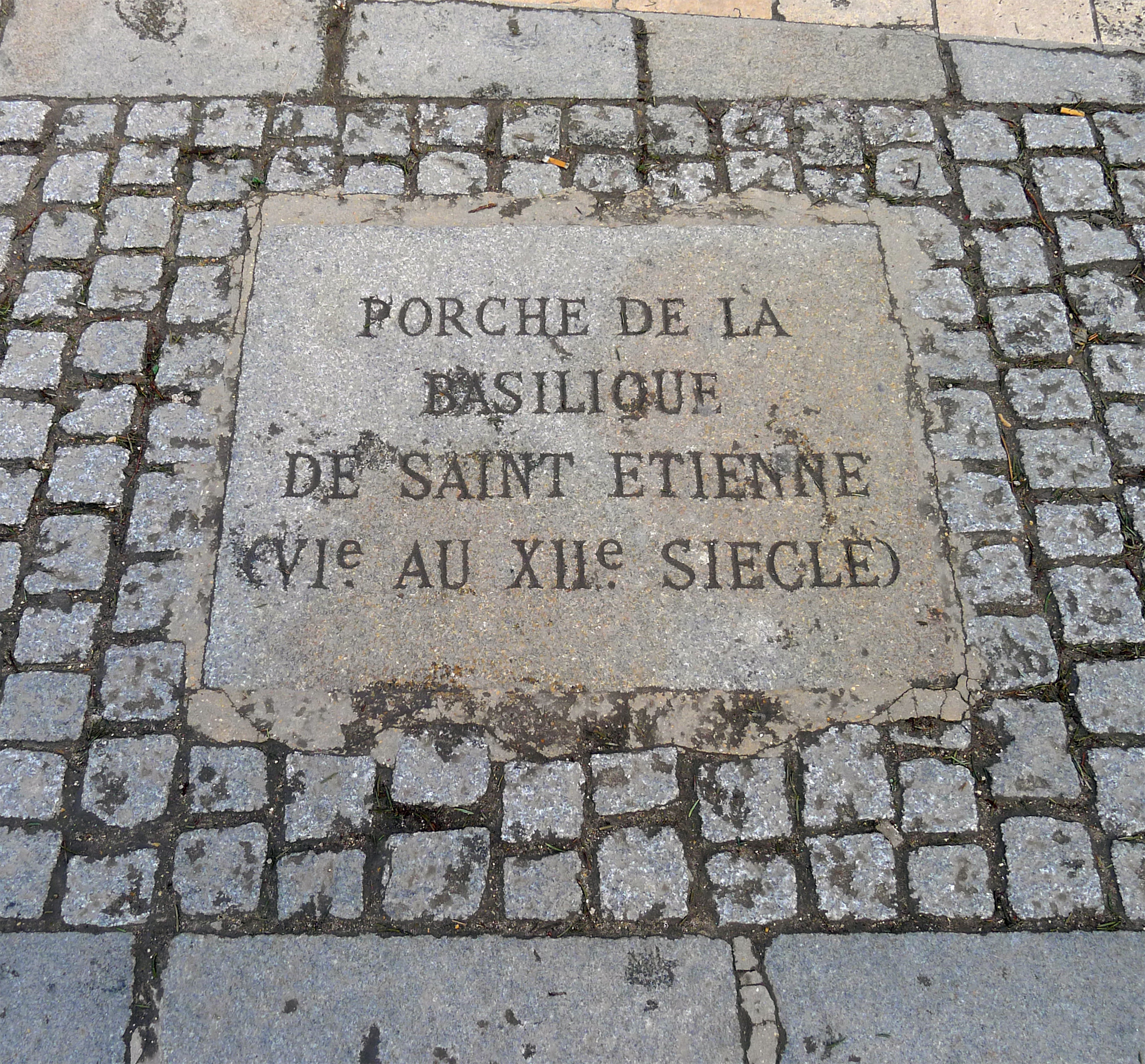
Saint-Étienne de Paris, 6th century basilica which preceded Notre-Dame, dedicated to Saint Stephen

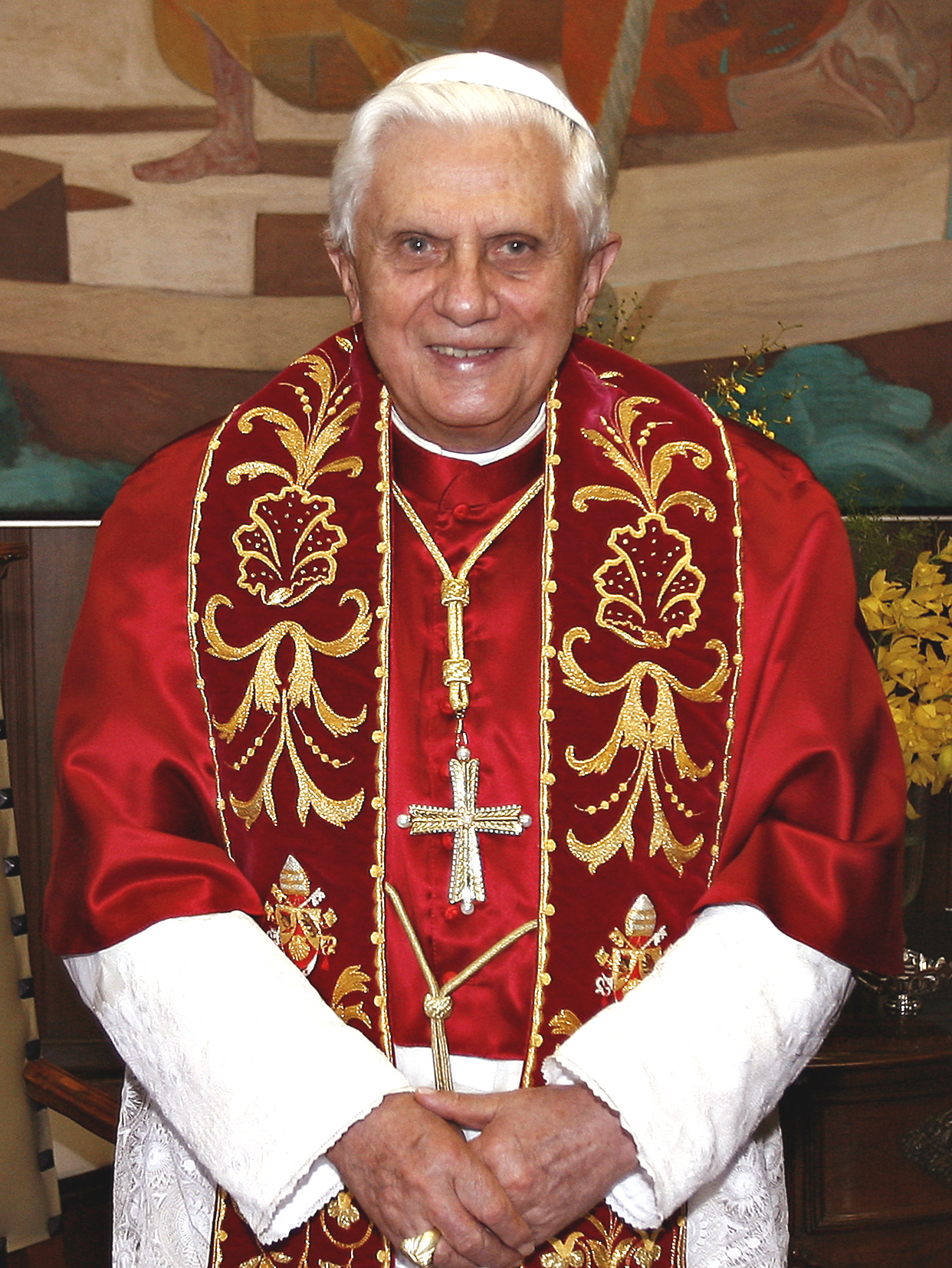
Pope Benedict XVI, born Joseph Ratzinger

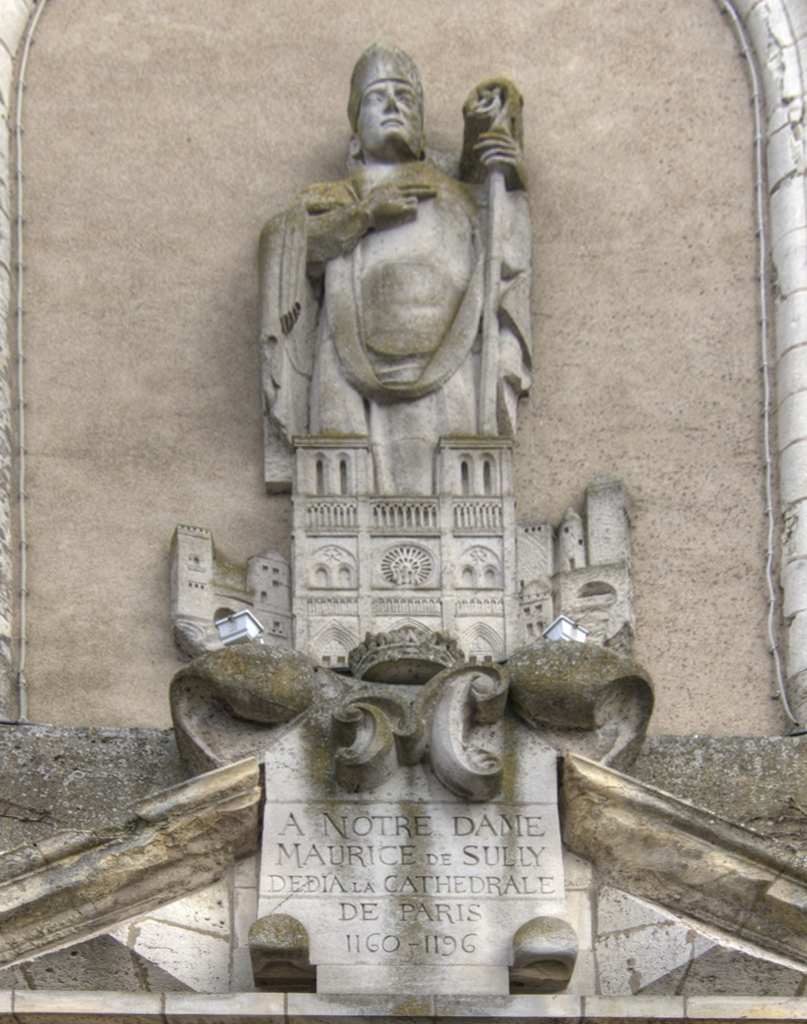
Maurice de Sully, 73rd bishop of Paris

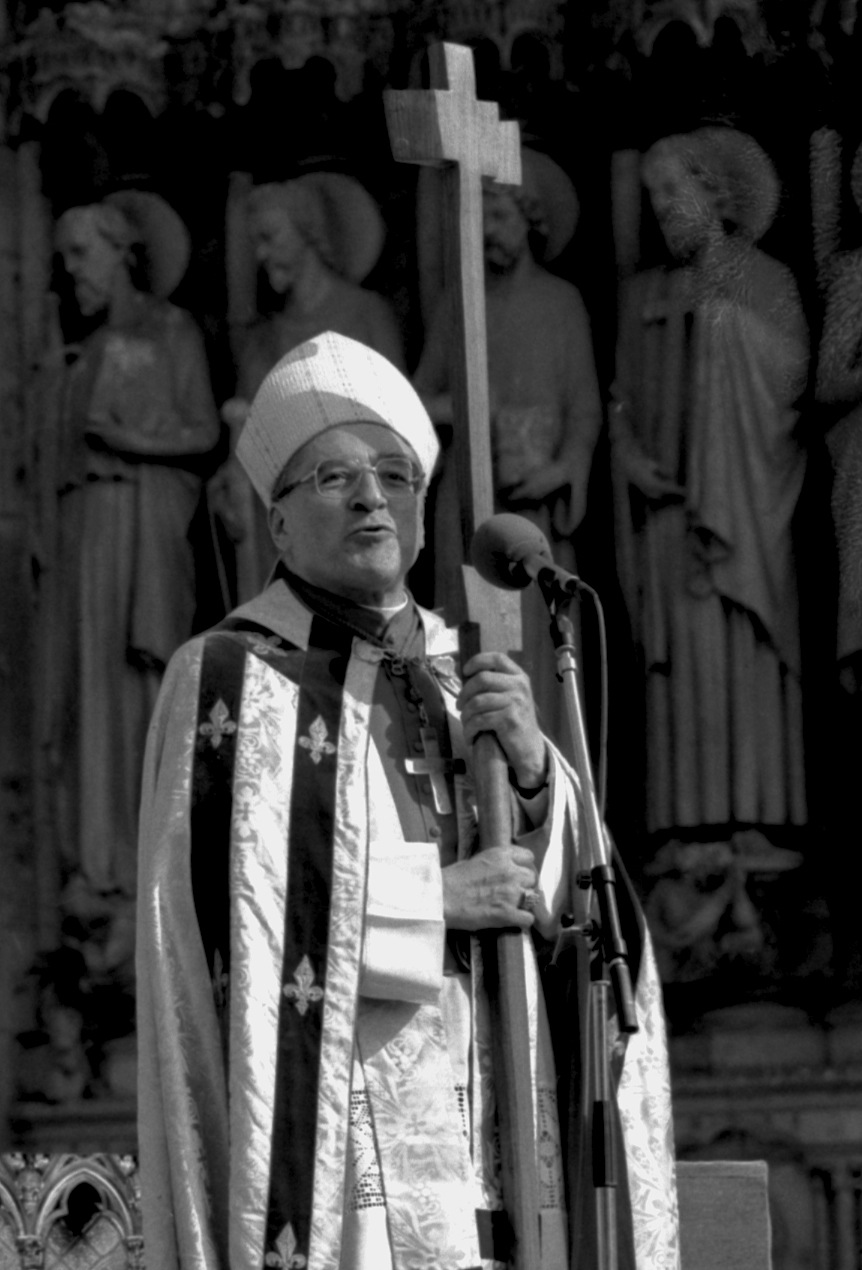
Jean-Marie Lustiger, 29th archbishop of Paris

=== List of bells (2025) ===
Location	No.	Image	Name	Year cast	Mass	Diameter	Tone	Audio
South tower	1		Emmanuel	1686	about 13,000 kg	2.61 m	F♯_{2}	
South tower	2		Marie	2012	6,023 kg	2.065 m	G♯_{2}	
North tower	3		Gabriel	2012	4,162 kg	1.828 m	A♯_{2}	
North tower	4		Anne-Geneviève	2012	3,477 kg	1.725 m	B_{2}	
North tower	5		Denis	2012	2,502 kg	1.536 m	C♯_{3}	
North tower	6		Marcel	2012	1,925 kg	1.393 m	D♯_{3}	
North tower	7		Étienne	2012	1,494 kg	1.267 m	E♯_{3}	
North tower	8		Benoît-Joseph	2012	1,309 kg	1.207 m	F♯_{3}	
North tower	9		Maurice	2012	1,011 kg	1.097 m	G♯_{3}	
North tower	10		Jean-Marie	2012	782 kg	99.7 cm	A♯_{3}	
North tower	Non-ringing		Denise David	1856	767 kg	1.05 m	F♯_{3}	
Sanctuary	11		Olympic Bell	2024	500 kg		D♯	
Sanctuary	12		Chiara	2024			F♯	
Sanctuary	13		Carlos	2024			G♯	

=== Inscriptions and decorations of 2012 bells ===
Marie is inscribed with the following benediction message and the Hail Mary prayer. It is also decorated with friezes of the Adoration of the Magi and the Marriage at Cana.

† l'an 2013 le 2 fevrier, sous le pontificat de sa saintete le pape benoit xvi, pai ete benit et nomme MARIE par son eminence le cardinal andre vingt-trois, archeveque de paris, assiste de monseigneur patrick jacquin, recteur-archipretre de la basilique metropolitain notre-dame de paris, a l'occasion du grand jubile du 850^{e} anniversaire de la cathedrale (1163–2013). je porte le nom du premier bourdon de notre-dame fondu en 1378, refondu la derniere fois en 1472 par thomas de claville et detruit en 1792. eijsbouts astensis me fecit anno mmxii

Inscriptions and decorations of the north tower bells were created by French artist Virginie Bassetti. Each bell is inscribed with its name, a line of the Angelus prayer, a symbolic number of fillets, and an artistic theme.

Bell	Angelus line	Fillets	Artistic theme
Gabriel	L'Ange du Seigneur apporta l'annonce à Marie (The Angel of the LORD declared unto Mary)	40: several meanings, see Biblical numerology § Numerological values	lilies: in Christian art, Gabriel often depicted bringing lilies to Mary during the Annunciation
Anne Geneviève	Et elle conçut du Saint Esprit (And she conceived of the Holy Spirit)	3: the trinity and three theological virtues (faith, hope, and love)	fire: tenacity of Saint Geneviève
Denis	Voici la servante du Seigneur (Behold the handmaid of the LORD)	7: the seven spiritual gifts described in Romans 12 and seven sacraments of the Catholic Church	scratches: martyrdom of Saint Denis
Marcel	Qu'il me soit fait selon ta parole (Be it done unto me according to thy word)	5: the three persons of God and two natures of Jesus	water: the Bièvre river, a reference to the legend of Saint Marcel and the dragon
Étienne	Et le Verbe s'est fait chair (And the Word was made flesh)	2: two natures of Jesus, a reference to the Angelus line	stones: the martyrdom of Saint Stephen by stoning
Benoît-Joseph	Et il a habité parmi nous (And dwelt among us)	12: the twelve apostles of Christ	Keys of Heaven: Saint Peter and the papacy
Maurice	Priez pour nous, sainte Mère de Dieu (Pray for us, O Holy Mother of God)	8: fullness	floor plan of Notre-Dame: role of Maurice de Sully in the cathedral's construction
Jean-Marie	Afin que nous soyons rendus dignes des promesses du Christ (That we may be made worthy of the promises of Christ)	9: the nine celestial hierarchies described in De Coelesti Hierarchia	initials and tetramorph: the Four Evangelists

== Ringing the bells ==
1899 sketches by Georges Redon
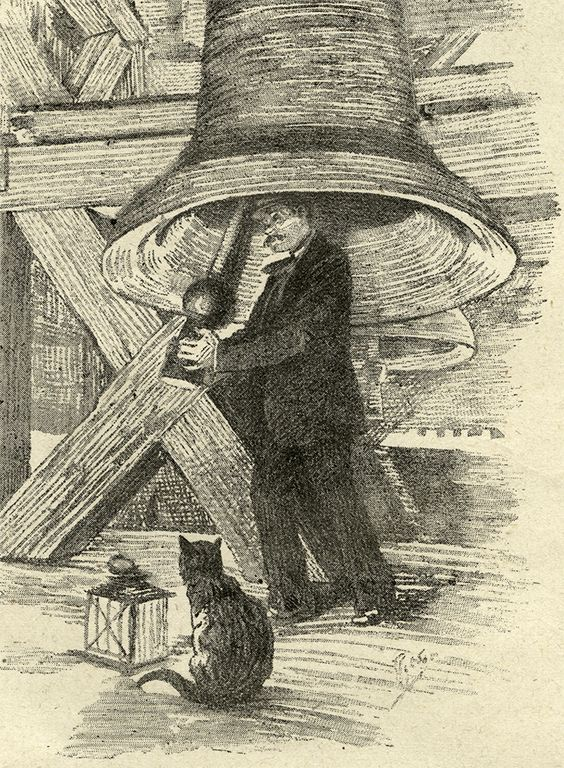
Auguste Herbet sounding the morning Angelus

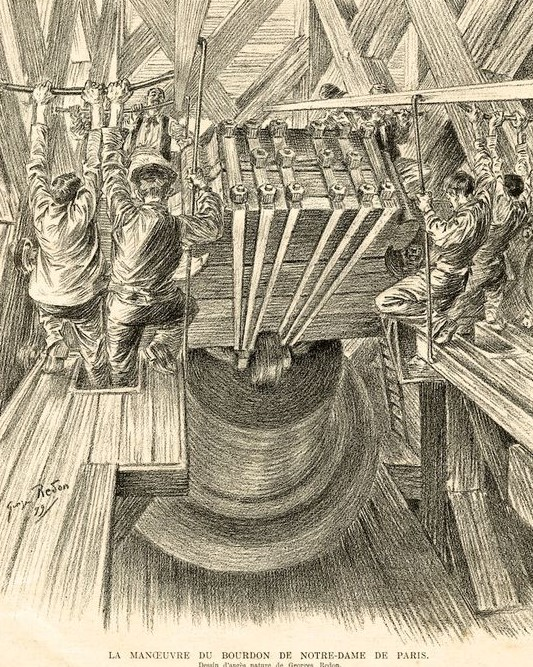
Emmanuel being rung by a team of eight bell ringers

The bells can be rung by swinging, usually called pealing or volleys (French: à la volée), or without swinging, usually called chiming (tinter) or strikes (coup). Volleys create a sound with perceived changes in volume and pitch, while chiming allows for more control and is used for the clock or for playing short melodies. Both methods are currently done by electric motors installed in the early 20th century. Prior to this, full-time bell ringers were employed.

In medieval times, an appointed churchwarden would oversee two bell ringers, a clergyman for the spire bells (the petit sonneur) and a layman for the main bells (the grand sonneur). To swing the bells, many assistants were recruited, as many as 40 at a time on feast days. Emmanuel alone required eight men just to start the peal, and 16 to maintain it for any length of time. The bells were usually swung with the use of pedals attached to the headstocks. (These pedals are still partially visible today on Emmanuel's headstock; they were removed on one side for the installation of a windlass.) However, at certain times the chapter would forbid bell ringers from entering the belfries at night for fear of them causing a fire by using open-flame lights. In these cases, the bells would be rung from the lower levels of the towers with ropes.

Antoine Gilbert served as grand sonneur during the Revolution and reluctantly aided in the removal of the bells. He nonetheless remained in the position through the restoration in 1802. His son Antoine-Pierre-Marie Gilbert succeeded him in 1820. The younger Gilbert wrote a detailed description of the cathedral and defended it from rioters during the July Revolution. He was succeeded in 1850 by Louis Herbet who helped save Notre-Dame from arsonists during the Paris Commune. Herbet also maintained a bookbinding workshop in the north tower. He was succeeded as grand sonneur by his son Auguste in 1892 and his grandson Émile in 1906, who was the last to hold the title.

Since the automation of ringing in the 1930s, the bells have been overseen by cathedral staff including general director Laurent Prades since 2000 and chief sacristan Stéphane Urbain since 2005. Urbain was the first to program the bells to play short melodies such as "Nun komm, der Heiden Heiland" and "Regina caeli."

=== Striking clock ===
Notre-Dame used to ring the civil hours 24 hours a day, but starting in the 19th century this was reduced to only between 8am to 9pm to avoid disturbing nearby residents.

From medieval times, the hours were marked on the main bells, likely only by the number of hours struck at the top of the hour. This function was taken over in the 18th century by the clock bells on the north transept. The 19th-century clock bells in the spire marked the number of hours with a series of descending triplets and an ascending triplet for the final hour. The roof bells struck the first two bells for each quarter hour, then marked the number of hours on the third bell. The roof bells were largely decommissioned as a striking clock in the 1980s as they were perceived to be disruptive during services. They nevertheless were still used to announce the arrival of Christmas during the annual Midnight Mass.

Since 2005, the main bells have been programmed to play short melodies for the clock. The repertoire greatly increased in 2013 thanks to the greater number of bells. Quarter hours are marked with a musical motif adapted from two 14th-century tunes from the Llibre Vermell de Montserrat – "Laudemus Virginem" and "Splendens Ceptigera" – one, two, and three bars for the first, second, and third quarter hours. These are the same throughout the year. The full hours are marked with about 50 different melodies played throughout the year. At 9pm every day the same melody is played, the compline hymn Te lucis ante terminum. After the melody, Gabriel marks the number of hours.

=== Angelus ===
The tradition of ringing for the recitation of the Angelus prayer three times a day began in 1472 when Louis XI ordered the practice. The Angelus rings a few seconds after the clock at 8 am (9 am on weekends and holidays), 12 noon, and 7 pm. It is announced by a short series of chimes followed by about a four-minute volley. The particular pattern of ringing depends on the time of day and time of year, changing during Lent and Eastertide.

=== Services ===
The bells announce services with different patterns of volleys, called sonneries. In the 18th century, Abbot Claude-Louis Marmotant de Savigny compiled a list of sonneries based on traditions developed by that time. The list followed a general hierarchy of solemnity, from the grand solennel (ringing order: 1, 2, 10, 9, 8, 7, 6, 5, 4, 3) used for the most solemn occasions, to Les Benjamines (ringing order: 10, 9, 8) used for baptisms. A simplified version of this list was used from 1856 to 2012, and the full practice was revived from 2013 to 2019.

The bells are always rung in connection with a Te Deum service. During the Ancien Régime, these were held after the coronation of a new king, the birth of a new heir apparent, military victories, or other causes of thanksgiving. This tradition has continued, the most recent Te Deum being held at Notre-Dame on 9 May 1945 after Victory in Europe Day. The next such service is to be held on 15 April 2024 during the cathedral's reopening.

The roof bells are rung during elevation, the moment during Mass when the clergyman holds up the Sacred Body and Blood of our Lord Jesus Christ Eucharist.

=== Historic events ===
The bells ring to celebrate the election of a new pope, usually with the grand solennel, and to mourn the death of a pope, usually by tolling the late pope's age on the bourdon.

The bells are usually not rung in times of war or invasion, except to be used as an alarm, or tocsin. Such was the case during World War I when the fighting came to within 30 kilometers of Paris. The bells rang again in celebration of the armistice of 11 November 1918. This tradition has since continued, with the ringing of the grand solennel every 11 November at 11:00 am. In recent years the petit solennel (ringing order: 2, 10, 9, 8, 7, 6, 5, 4, 3) has alternately rung in order to preserve Emmanuel.

The bells also remained silent during the German occupation during World War II. On 25 August 1944, as French and American troops were entering Paris, Notre-Dame's bells rang again, soon joined by bells across the city. At the time, many Parisians did not know how close Allied forces were, as the Germans had imposed a strict curfew and controlled the radio stations. The sound of Notre-Dame's bells was the first indication to many residents that the liberation of the city was imminent. In his memoirs, General Dietrich von Choltitz, the German military governor of Paris, recalled how he called his superior, General Hans Speidel, and simply held the telephone out the window. The French Ministry of Culture soon afterward classified Emmanuel as a historic monument. This precludes the bell from being destroyed or recast. The liberation has subsequently been celebrated every year on 25 August with the ringing of the grand solennel at 7:00 pm.

In the 21st century, the bells have rung in times of mourning after terrorist attacks. On 12 September 2001, Emmanuel was rung for almost an hour in solidarity with the United States after the September 11 attacks. Such ringing was, and still is, extremely rare, as the antique bell is only rung on rare occasions in order to preserve it. The bells were also rung for the January 2015 Charlie Hebdo shooting and the November 2015 Paris attacks.

== Cultural depictions ==
In the 1534 novel Gargantua by François Rabelais, the giant Gargantua steals the bells of Notre-Dame to hang around the neck of his giant mare. A theologian named Janotus de Bragmardo delivers an inept speech to convince the giant to return them.

The bells are most known in popular culture from Victor Hugo's 1831 novel The Hunchback of Notre-Dame and its many adaptations. The story, set in 1482, features Quasimodo, a fictional bell ringer of Notre-Dame, and descriptions of the cathedral's medieval bells. The bells mentioned in the novel are identical to those in a 1612 text by Jacques du Breul used as a reference by Hugo. These are Marie, Jacqueline, Gabriel (which du Breul spells "Gabrielle," also seen in Hugo), Guillaume, Thibauld, Pasquier, two "sparrows" (French: moineaux—a generic term for smaller bells, possibly Jean with Claude or Nicholas), and the seven-bell carillon including a "wooden bell" (cloche de bois), possibly La Clopette. Information about Hugo as well as illustrations and excerpts from the novel are displayed in the south tower which was open to the public before the fire.

The 1996 film adaptation by Disney opens and closes with a song called "The Bells of Notre Dame". Four fictional bells are named Little Sophia, Jeanne-Marie, Anne-Marie, and Louise-Marie (Quasimodo refers to the latter three as "triplets"); "Big Marie" is the nonfictional bourdon Marie which first appeared in the 13th century. In the 2002 sequel, there is another fictional bell named La Fidèle which is made of gold and decorated with jewels (however, such a bell would not work in real life).

The bells have also been the subject of poetry, such as François Villon's 1461 Le Testament and Catherine Phil MacCarthy's "The Bells of Notre-Dame."
