= Marcellus of Paris =

Gallo-Roman bishop and Frankish saint

Saint Marcel of Paris
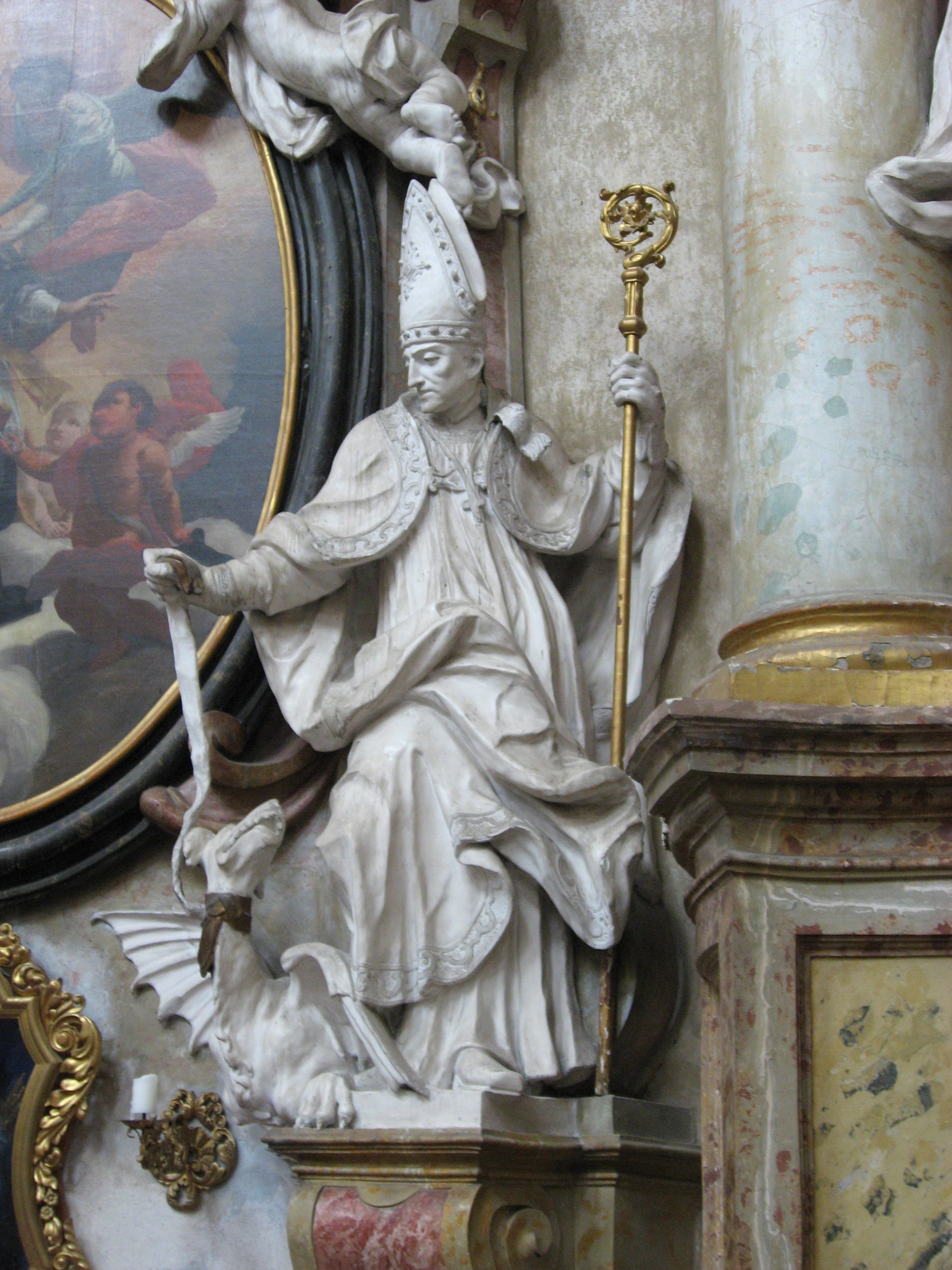
- Statue of Saint Marcel in the church of the Abbey of Rajhrad, Czech Republic.

Bishop of Paris
- Born: Marcelo (Marcellus) île de la Cité, Gallia Lugdunensis, Western Roman Empire
- Died: c. 1 November 436; Paris, Gallia Lugdunensis, Western Roman Empire
- Feast: 1 November

Marcel of Paris (French: Marcel de Paris) or St Marcellus was the 9th bishop of Paris and namesake of a bell of Notre-Dame de Paris.

== Biography ==
Marcellus of Paris was born in Lutetia (now île de la Cité, Paris), located in Gallia Lugdunensis, Roman Gaul, within the Western Roman Empire.

His dedication to virtue and prayer led to his recommendation to Prudentius, bishop of Paris, who ordained him as Reader. He was then promoted to priesthood and succeeded Prudentius after his death.

His preaching led to the conversion of many pagans, and miracles like turning water from the Seine into wine and balsam made him famous. He is also the subject of a fable and is said to have slain a dragon, representing Christianity's victory over the demon.

He served as the Roman Catholic bishop of Paris until 435.

== Death ==
Marcellus of Paris died on 1 November 436 AD in Paris (then Lutetia), Gallia Lugdunensis, Roman Gaul, Western Roman Empire. His body was buried near Paris, in a village called the suburb of St Marceau.
