= Bourdon (bell) =

Musical instrument

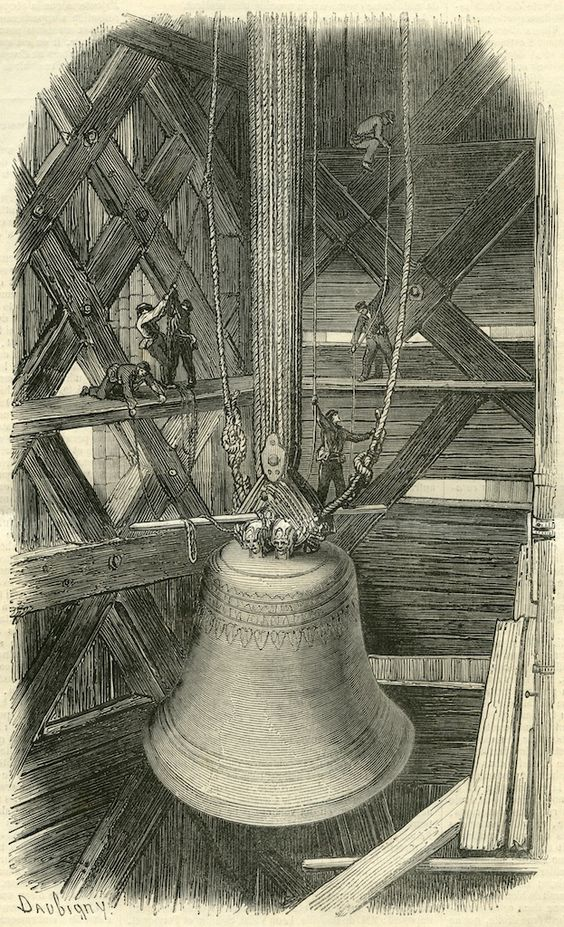
Emmanuel, the 13-ton bourdon of Notre-Dame de Paris being remounted in 1850 during restoration

The bourdon is the heaviest of the bells that belong to a musical instrument, especially a chime or a carillon, and produces its lowest tone. The name derives from the French word for bumblebee.

Although carillons are by definition chromatic, the next bell up from the bourdon is traditionally a whole tone higher in pitch, leaving a semitone out of the instrument. Bells separated from the next higher note by more than two semitones (one whole tone) are called sub-bourdons.

== Function ==
The deep, resonant tone of a bourdon is used to mark hours, call to prayer, and solemnize major national or religious events like funerals, royal celebrations, or the end of wars, adding majesty and historical significance to bell towers and churches.

== Examples of Bourdon bells ==
As an example, the largest bell of a carillon of 64 bells, the sixth largest bell hanging in the world, in the Southern Illinois town of Centralia, is identified as the 'bourdon.' It weighs 11,000 pounds (5,000 kg) and is tuned to G. In the Netherlands where carillons are native, the heaviest carillon is in Grote Kerk in Dordrecht (South Holland).

The biggest bell serving as bourdon of any carillon is the low C bell at Riverside Church, New York City. Cast in 1929 as part of the Rockefeller Carillon, it weighs 19,000 kg (41,000 lb) and measures 3.10 m (10 ft 2 in) across.

The bourdon at St. Paul’s Cathedral in London, called Great Paul, weighs 16.7 tonnes (37,000 pounds). It is the largest bell ever cast in the British Isles. Great Paul is the second heaviest bell in the United Kingdom after the 25.7 tonnes (57,000 pounds) Olympic Bell, cast in the Netherlands for the 2012 London Games. As it is not a part of a harmonically-tuned set, the Olympic Bell is not considered a bourdon.

In 1519 Strasbourg Cathedral commissioned Jerg von Speyer to create what was said to be the largest bell in Europe; 2.74 meters in diameter and weighing twenty tons. This enormous bell was installed but cracked shortly afterwards. Its place as the bourdon was taken by an older bell, the "Totenglocke", or "Death bell", which was traditionally used for mourning.

Although typically a bourdon bell is the considered the largest bell, some cathedrals in Europe mostly typically have at least two bourdon bells. The next largest bourdon bell in a cathedral is called the second bourdon. For example Notre-Dame de Paris has 10 ringing bells; but the two largest bells are bourdon bells, named Marie and Emmanuel which are hung in the south tower. Cologne Cathedral has eleven church bells and the 3 largest bells are bourdon bells.

== English-style ring of bells ==
The heaviest bell in a diatonically tuned English-style ring of bells (change ringing) is called the tenor. If a larger, heavier bell is also present it would be called a bourdon. The bourdon is not part of the change ringing peal; instead, it is hung from a pivoted beam and is typically only used to sound the hour or for other civic and religious purposes.

== See also ==
- Campanology
- Carillon
- Pieter and François Hemony
