= Basilica of Saint-Pierre-aux-Nonnains =

Early Medieval church in Metz, France

- Ancienne abbaye Saint-Pierre
- église Saint-Pierre-aux-Nonnains
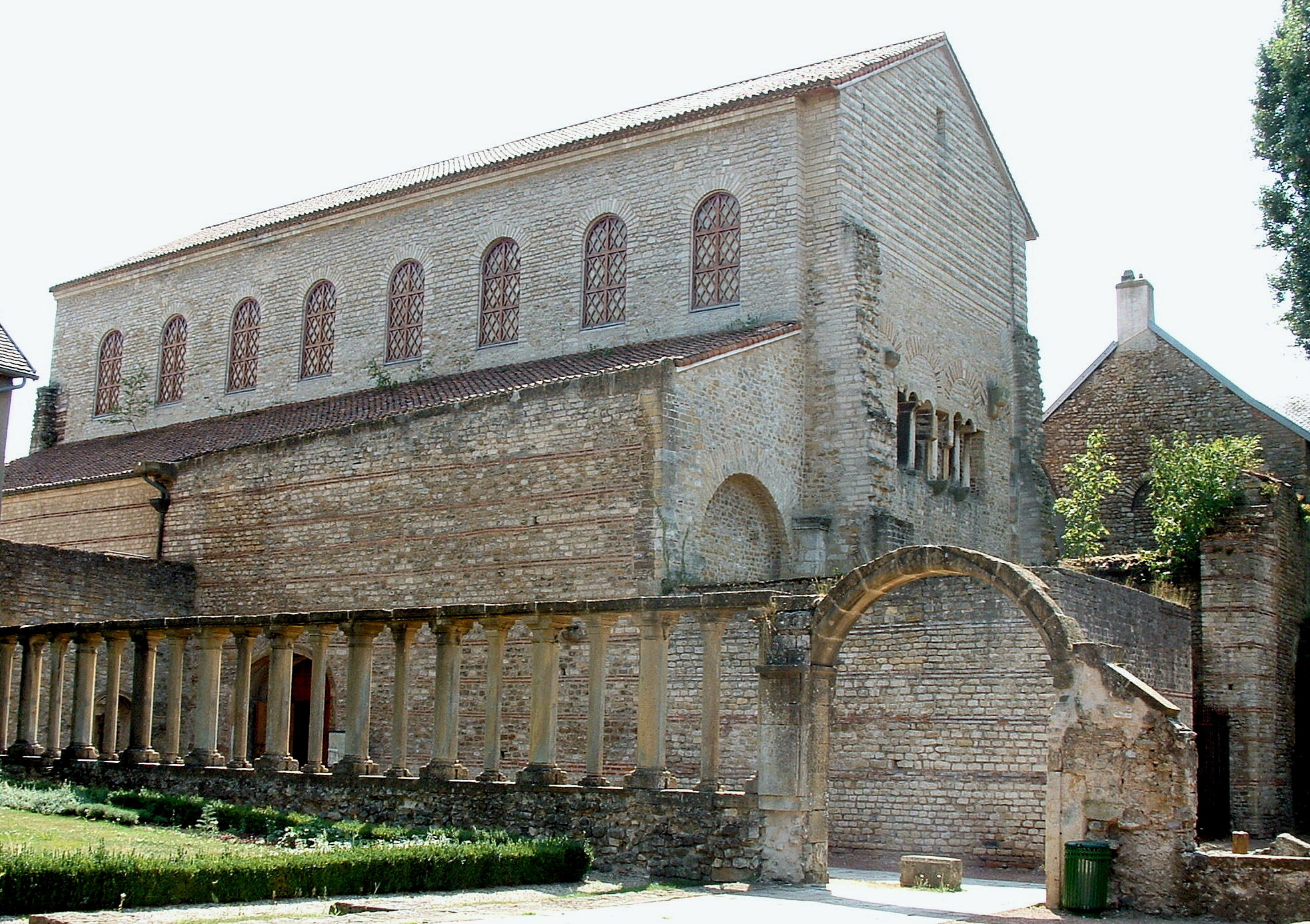
- Basilica of Saint-Pierre-aux-Nonnains
- 49°06′54″N 6°10′10″E
- Location: Metz, Moselle, Grand Est
- Address: 1 rue de la Citadelle
- Country: France
- Previous denomination: Catholic
- Website: https://metz.fr/lieux/lieu-129.php

History
- Status: Abbey church
- Dedication: Saint Peter

Architecture
- Functional status: Deconsecrated (museum)
- Style: Late Roman, Ottonian
- Years built: 7th-century, 13th century, 15th–16th centuries
- Groundbreaking: 370–400

Specifications
- Materials: Stone

Administration
- Diocese: Metz

Monument historique
- Official name: Ancienne abbaye Saint-Pierre
- Type: Classé
- Designated: 31 December 1909
- Reference no.: PA00106812

The basilica of Saint-Pierre-aux-Nonnains in Metz, France, is one of the oldest churches in Europe. The building began life in the 4th century when Metz was an important Gallo-Roman city.

== History ==
The building belonged to one of several thermae (public baths complexes) which existed in Metz in Roman times. Some sources describe it as having been a gymnasium. In the 7th century, the structure was converted into a church, becoming the chapel of a Benedictine nunnery. A new nave was constructed in the 11th century with further interior renovations.

In the 16th century Metz was besieged by the troops of Charles V and later was converted into an important garrison town by the French. The building became a warehouse, and remained so after being declared a historical monument in 1909. In the 1970s it was restored and opened for concerts and exhibitions.

== Burials ==
- Drogo of Champagne

== See also ==
- Oldest churches in the world
