= Nikolai Tomsky =

Soviet artist and pedagogist (1900–1984)

- Николай Томский
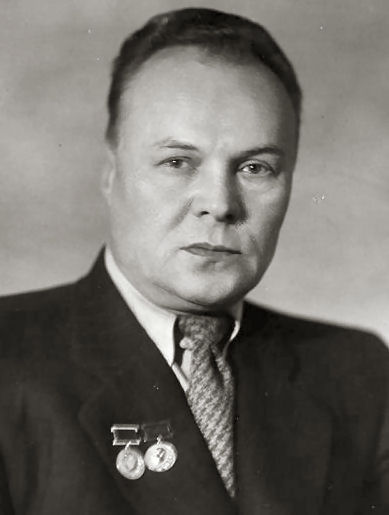
- Tomsky in 1952
- Born: 6 December 1900; Ramushevo, Starorussky Uyezd, Novgorod Governorate
- Died: 22 November 1984 (aged 83); Moscow, Soviet Union
- Education: Tavricheskaya Art School
- Occupation: Sculptor
- Known for: Ceremonial monuments of the Socialist Realism

Nikolai Vasilyevich Tomsky (Russian: Никола́й Васи́льевич То́мский; 19 December [O.S. 6 December] 1900 – 22 November 1984) was a much-decorated Soviet sculptor, designer of many well-known ceremonial monuments of the Socialist Realism era. The sculptor first came to attention with his memorial to Sergei Kirov, a heroic bronze with friezes around the base, for which he won the 1941 Stalin Prize. Thereafter his career developed in an official direction; he would be eventually tasked to re-design Lenin's own sarcophagus, produce Stalin's bust at Stalin's grave at the Moscow Kremlin Wall, and produce at least five major statues of Lenin throughout the Soviet Union. His distinctive red-granite Lenin stood in the Leninplatz of East Berlin from 1970 to 1992.

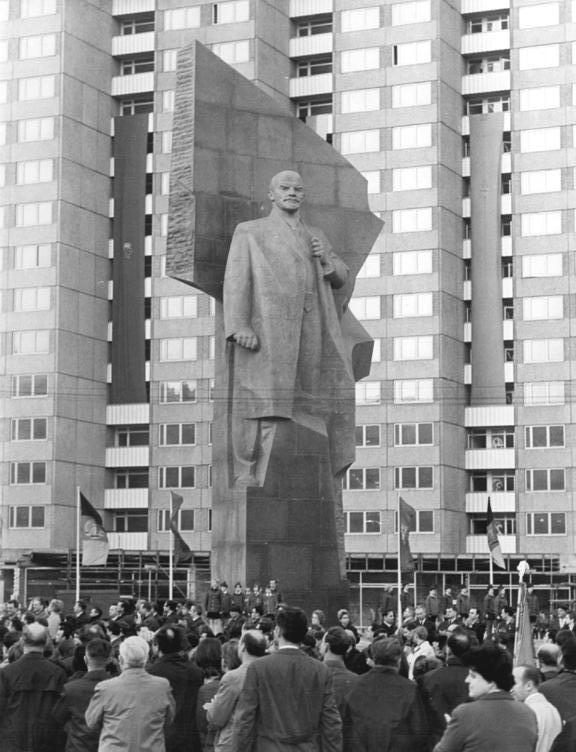
Lenin in East Berlin, Germany, 1970, removed 1992

== Biography ==
Born in the village of Ramushevo in Starorussky Uyezd, Novgorod Governorate, Russian Empire, into a blacksmith's family, Tomsky studied in Leningrad. In 1927, he graduated from the Arts and Crafts College.After demobilization, he went to Petrograd in 1923, where he enrolled in the sculpture department of the Art and Pedagogical College, graduating in 1927. His director was Vsevolod Lishev.

Tomsky designed sculptures of Vladimir Lenin in Sevastopol, Crimea (1923) and Mogilev, Belarus (1933) with Vasily Kozlov. He first exhibited in 1925 at the Leningrad Museum of the Revolution, during an exhibition dedicated to his memory. In the 1920s and 1930s, he participated in the restoration of monumental and decorative sculpture in Leningrad, studying the traditions of the 19th-century Russian school of sculpture, which influenced his artistic style, combining the individual and the typical, a characteristic gesture with carefully modeled forms, finishing, and the creation of images imbued with pathos and heroic fervor. At this time, the artist was working on a monument to Sergeyi Kirov (in 1935, an all-Union competition for monument designs on Kirov Square near the Kirov District Council in Leningrad was announced; the winning entry was by sculptor Tomsky and architect Noi Trotsky). The monument was unveiled on December 6, 1938. The pedestal bears bas-reliefs dedicated to the themes of the civil war and labor. (Bronze and granite. This work was awarded the USSR Stalin Prize—the sculptor's first state award). In 1937, the sculptor created the statue of Aleksandr Busygin (plaster).

During the Great Patriotic War, while in besieged Leningrad, he actively participated in camouflage operations aimed not only at solving defense problems but also at saving the besieged city's cultural heritage. He led a team of sculptors working on relief propaganda posters. Together with Vera Isayeva, Mikhail Baburin, G. B. Pyankova-Rakhmanina, R. N. Budilov, B. R. Shalyutin, Venyamin Bogolyubov, and A. A. Strekavin, he created the sculptural panel "For the Motherland!" (6 x 5 m), which was installed on Nevsky Prospect near the State Public Library.

After the war, the sculptor worked in Moscow. In the late 1940s, he sculpted and cast in bronze, and carved in stone, a number of portraits and full-length figures. The portrait gallery created by the sculptor during this time includes military leaders and heroes of the Great Patriotic War: Ivan Chernyakhovsky (marble, 1947); Musa Gareyev (basalt, 1947),Pyotr Pokryshev (marble, 1948), Aleksey Smirnov (marble, 1948) — all in the State Tretyakov Gallery; Ivan Kozhedub (sketch, bronze, 1948; Russian Museum, Leningrad; A bust was also installed in the village park of Obrazhiyevka village, Shostka Raion; architect Lev Golubovsky; bronze, marble. 1949). Monument to Iosif Apanasenko (Belgorod; bronze, 1944-49). The sculptor was awarded several State Prizes for his portrait series, the monument to Apanasenko, and monumental reliefs on historical and revolutionary themes (with co-authors; plaster, 1949), as well as the portrait of Kirov (marble, 1949; Tretyakov Gallery).

He led teams of sculptors who created monumental figures for the Seven Sisters in Moscow and worked on the design of the Moscow Metro. His collaborators in these groups included Mikhail Baburin, Pavel Bondarenko, N. I. Rudko, Mikhail Smirnov, Robert Taurit, Andrei Faidysh-Krandievsky, Dmitry Schwartz, Gavriil Schultz, and others. Since the mid-1950s, the sculptor's portraits have deepened the individual characterization of the sitter, and his sculpting style has become more fluid; the imagery acquires a meaningful and expressive psychological structure. The sculptor's nude works are distinguished by lyricism and a keen understanding of nature. He drew portraits of politicians, scientists, and cultural figures, created from sketches or during his foreign travels, when the sculptor remained creatively active. These include portraits of Józef Lyaskovsky, the Mexican muralist Diego Rivera (1956-1957), the Polish revolutionary W. Shopski (1957), the Bulgarian artist Vladimir Dimitrov (1957), the President of the GDR Wilhelm Pieck (1956), and General E. P. Petit (1957). The sculptor's female portraits are also meaningful, revealing the character of their models—a consonance between harmonious appearance and charm, inner beauty (Female Portrait, 1964).

From 1948 he taught at the Moscow Art Institute (Rector from 1964 to 1970, Professor). While teaching at the Moscow Art Institute, from 1960 to 1968 he directed a creative workshop at the Repin Institute of Painting, Sculpture, and Architecture of the USSR Academy of Arts in Leningrad.

Tomsky became a full member of the USSR Academy of Arts (1949, and president from 1968 to 1983), member of the Academy of Arts of the GDR, the Hero of Socialist Labor (1970), five Stalin Prize laureate (1941, 1947, 1949, 1950, 1952), the winner of the Lenin Prize (1972) and the USSR State Prize (1979), holder of three Orders of Lenin, the Order of the October Revolution, Order of the Red Banner and the Order of Karl Marx (GDR). He taught at MGAHIS (1948–1982), as Professor and as Rector of the Academy (1964–1970).

== Work ==
- monument to Sergey Kirov, Kirovskaya Square, St. Peterburg, 1937, with architect Noi Trotsky – Stalin Prize second degree (1941
- major frieze called Defense, Labor and Rest at the House of Soviets, St. Petersburg, 1936–1941, for architect Noi Trotsky
- Lenin, Varshavsky Rail Terminal, St. Petersburg, 1947, removed 2001
- bas-reliefs at the Novokuznetskaya Moscow metro station, 1943
- Victory Bridge, Moscow, with architect Dmitry Chechulin, 1943
- Stalin at the Kurskaya (Koltsevaya Line) Moscow metro station, 1950, removed 1961
- monument to Ivan Chernyakhovsky, Vilnius, 1950, relocated to Voronezh in 1993
- monument to Nikolai Gogol on Gogolevsky Boulevard, Moscow (replacing the controversial monument by Nikolay Andreyev), 1952
- bust of Stalin at his grave, Kremlin Wall Necropolis, 1953
- monument to Mikhail Lomonosov, Moscow University, 1954
- monument to Pavel Nakhimov, Sevastopol, 1959
- work at the Tomb of the Unknown Soldier (Moscow), 1967
- Lenin at Leninplatz, former East Berlin, 1970, removed and buried in 1992
- re-designed sarcophagus at Lenin's Tomb, Moscow, 1973
- equestrian statue of Field Marshal Kutuzov in the Kutuzovsky Prospekt, Moscow, 1973
- Tombstone on Vasily Svarog's grave, Novodevichy Cemetery

== Awards ==
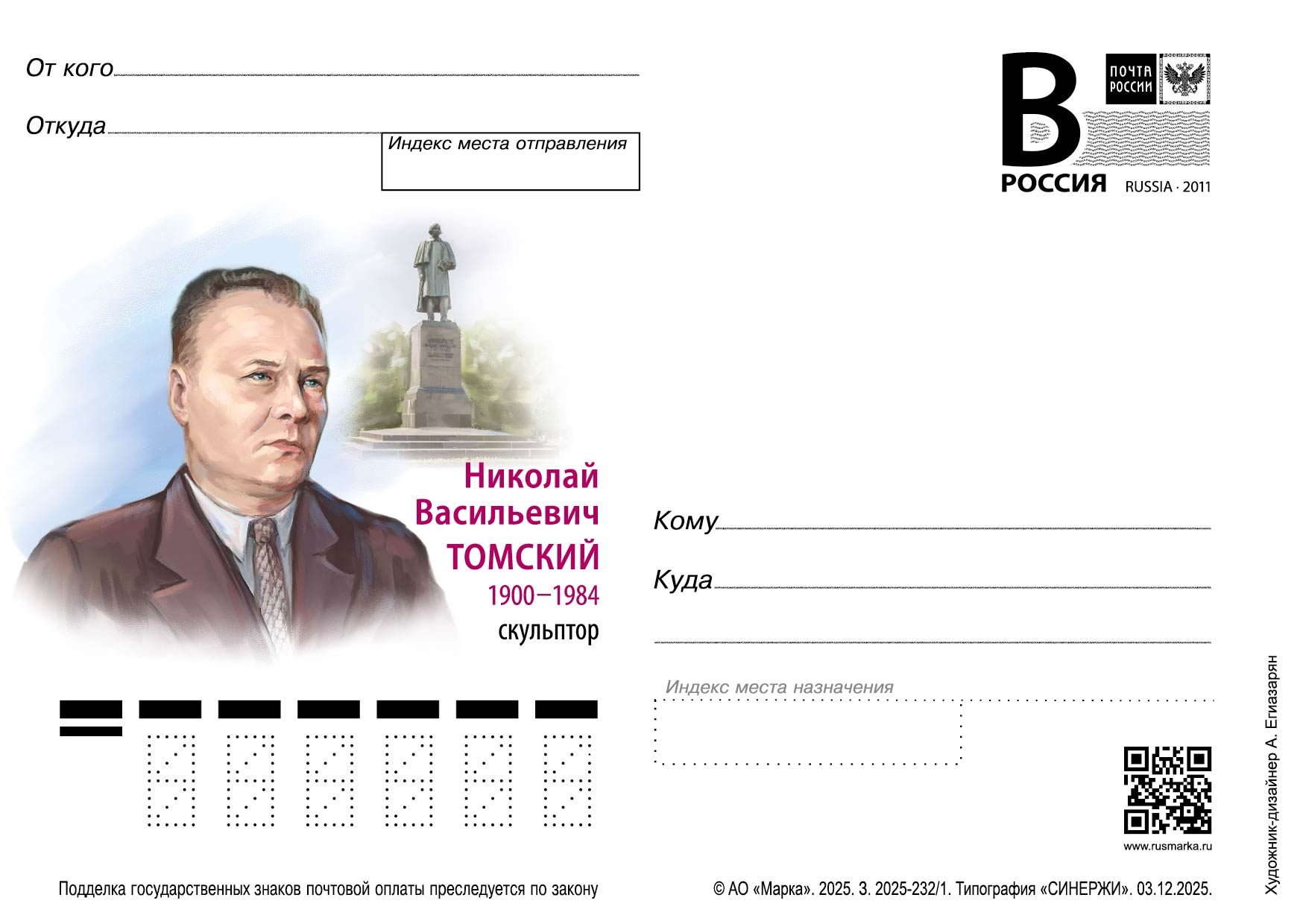
Tomski on a 2025 postcard of Russia

- Lenin Prize (1972)
- Stalin Prize second degree (1941, 1949, 1952)
- Stalin Prize first degree (1948, 1950)
- USSR State Prize (1979)
- Repin RSFSR State Prize
- Hero of Socialist Labour
- Order of Lenin
- Order of the October Revolution
- Order of the Red Banner of Labour
- Medal "For the Defence of Leningrad"
- Medal "For Valiant Labour in the Great Patriotic War 1941–1945"
- Order of Karl Marx
- People's Painter of the USSR
- People's Painter of the RSFSR
- Honored Artist of the RSFSR
