= Metz Citadel =

16th-century fort at Metz, France

Coordinates: 49.1136°N 6.1714°E

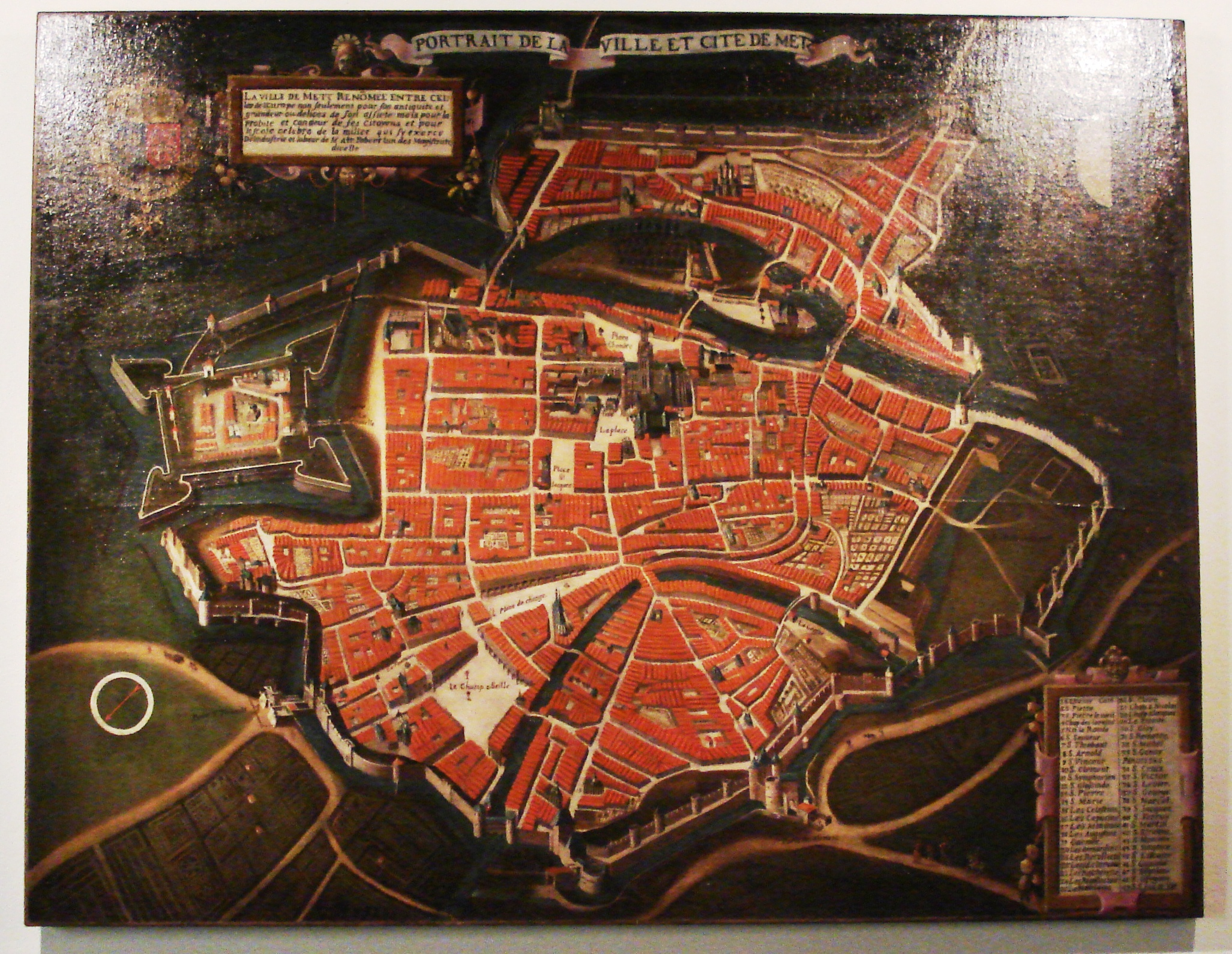
The citadel (top left)

Metz Citadel was a 16th-century artillery fortification built in Metz after the city came under French control in 1552. Constructed from 1556 - 1564, it was designed both to defend the city and to secure French authority over it.

The citadel later became part of broader fortification systems associated with Vauban and his successors. Although largely dismantled in the 19th century, its site is now occupied by civic buildings, green spaces, and archaeological remains.

== History ==
=== Early phases ===
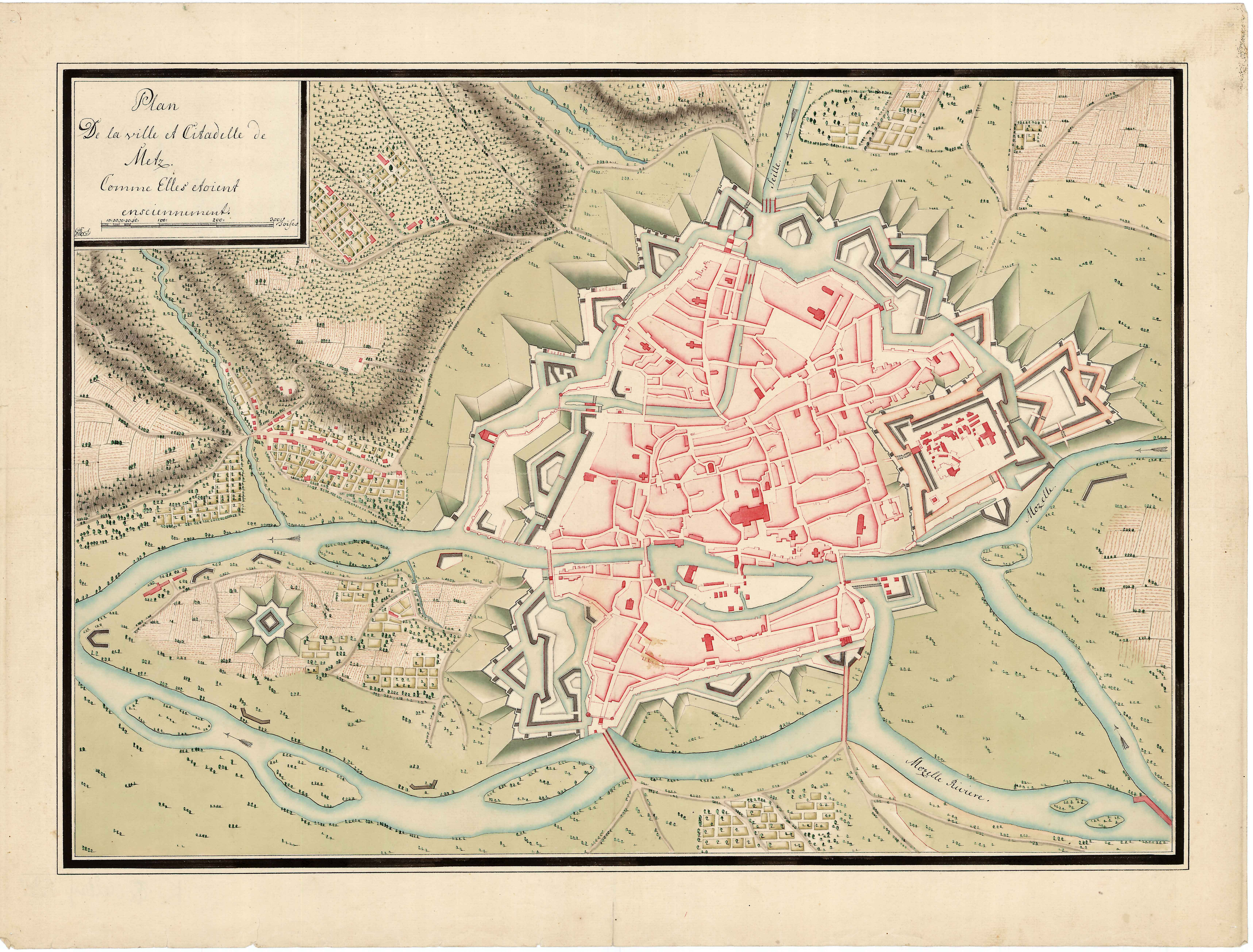
Plan of the city of Metz with the citadel and outer fortifications, ca. 1726

After the French defeated the Holy Roman Empire in the Siege of Metz in 1552, the city became a French protectorate as the 'Messine Republic' with a French garrison. To house it, an artillery-proof citadel was begun in 1556, only four years after the siege. Although the protectorate was still technically and legally part of the Empire, the city was now a 'de facto' French possession.

The citadel's construction was ordered by François de Scépeaux de Vieille-Ville, governor of the Three Bishoprics and involved the Italian military engineer Rocco Guerrini The city's population was forced to take part in the works and supply the French troops' needs. Completed around 1564, the citadel reinforced the south-west sector of the city's medieval ramparts, which had proved the hardest area to crack during the siege but could no longer be adapted to advances in artillery. Its aim was to control the city itself and its approaches, with cannon that could be turned to fire in either direction. As with the Spandau Citadel, built on the same model, it had four angled bastions surrounded by a four-sided moat - the neighbouring lac aux Cygnes was the former canal, allowing a link between the moat and the Moselle. The supply depot is the last visible trace of the building of this era.

Some religious and secular buildings had to be demolished to build the citadel, but some churches were kept by the military authorities, such as the Templar Chapel and Saint-Pierre-aux-Nonnains. In 1648 the city was signed over to France in the Treaties of Westphalia and so the citadel was later integrated into a system of fortifications designed by Sébastien Le Prestre de Vauban from 1676 and brought to fruition by his pupil Louis de Cormontaigne between 1728 and 1749.

=== Present day ===
The citadel has recently been converted for civilian use - the former arsenal is now an auditorium, the supply depot a deluxe hotel. The porte Serpenois next to it is now only decorative and the former ditches have given way to green spaces such as the Esplanade de Metzand the jardin Boufflers. The Esplanade's gardens below place de la République were extended after the citadel's destruction and occupy the site of the former ditches dug in 1816.

The Governor's Palace was built by the Germans at the start of the 20th century on the site of a bastion of the dismantled citadel. Several Roman monuments and ramparts were brought to light on the site as well as the medieval Tour d'Enfer tower in the subsoil of the gardens.

== Bibliography (in French) ==
- Louis-Jean-Baptiste Devilly, « Rapport sur les antiquités découvertes en 1822 à la citadelle de Metz (sculptures et inscriptions romaines) », dans les Mémoires de l’académie de Metz, 1822-1823, pp. 72–79.
- F. de Saulcy, « Peintures à fresque du XIV siècle existant à la citadelle de Metz », dans les Mémoires de l’académie de Metz, 1834-1835, S. Lamort, Metz, pp. 446.
- Henry Maguin, « Objets du moyen âge découverts à la citadelle de Metz », dans les Mémoires de la Société d’archéologie et d’histoire de la Moselle, t. III, 1860, p. 188.
- Ernest de Bouteiller, « Sur les objets antiques et modernes découverts dans les fouilles de la citadelle », dans le Bulletin de la Société d’archéologie et d’histoire de la Moselle, 1860, p. 6.
- F.-M. Chabert, « Mémoire de tout ce qui s’est passé à la démolition du lieu où est la citadelle et les lieux de retranchement de Guise et la place Saint-Jacques, comme aussi des autour de Metz. » dans L’Austrasie (1863), Rousseau-Pallez, Metz, 1864, pp. 23-28.
- Auguste Prost, « Salle peinte de l’abbaye de Sainte-Marie (citadelle) », Bulletin de la Société d’archéologie et d’histoire de la Moselle,1872, p. 35.
- Jean-Julien Barbé, « La citadelle, la porte des Allemands » dans Le Lorrain, 11 septembre 1948.
