= Aleksey Smirnov (pilot) =

Soviet fighter pilot (1917–1987)

Aleksey Semyonovich Smirnov
- Алексей Семёнович Смирнов
- Born: 7 February [O.S. 25 January] 1917; Paltsevo village, Tver Governorate, Russian Empire
- Died: 7 August 1987 (aged 70); Moscow, USSR
- Military career
- Allegiance: Soviet Union
- Branch: Soviet Air Force
- Service years: 1938–1954
- Rank: Colonel
- Conflicts: World War II; Winter War; Eastern Front
- Awards: Hero of the Soviet Union (twice)

Aleksey Semyonovich Smirnov (Russian: Алексей Семёнович Смирнов; 7 February [O.S. 25 January] 1917 – 7 August 1987) was a fighter pilot and flying ace of the Soviet Air Forces during the Second World War. He gained 35 solo victories during the war and was one of the few people awarded the title Hero of the Soviet Union twice.

== Early life ==
Smirnov was born on 7 February [O.S. 25 January] 1917 to a Karelian family in the village of Paltsevo in the Tver Governorate of the Russian Empire. After completing his seventh grade of school in 1934, he moved to the city of Kalinin in 1935 where he worked at a railway depot. In 1937 he graduated from training at the Kalinin aeroclub. He worked as a storekeeper from 1936 until he joined the Red Army in 1938. In December that year he graduated from the Odessa Military Aviation School of Pilots and was assigned to the 11th Fighter Aviation Regiment, which used the I-16. From February to March 1940 he participated in the Winter War as a senior pilot flying the I-153 in the 153rd Fighter Aviation Regiment. After the end of the war with Finland he remained in his regiment. In 1941 he became a member of the Communist Party.

== World War II ==
By the time Germany invaded the Soviet Union in June 1941, Smirnov had been promoted to the position of flight commander in the 153rd Fighter Aviation Regiment. He saw combat during the first month of the invasion, flying both the I-16 and I-153 to conduct reconnaissance, ground attack, escort, and ground defense missions. While flying an I-153 on 9 July 1941 he shot down a Bf 109, gaining his first shootdown; however, he did not gain any more victories while flying the I-153. During a ground-attack mission on 21 August 1941 he was wounded during the flight but managed to return to his airfield. He was shot down on 14 September 1941 and parachuted out with a leg wound, but survived. In November 1942 the 153rd Fighter Aviation Regiment was honored with the Guards designation and renamed as the 28th Guards Fighter Aviation Regiment. The unit was later re-equipped with Bell P-39 Airacobras and trained to fly them in Spring 1942. On 23 July 1942 Smirnov and five others flew a mission to protect Soviet troops in the Semiluksky district of Voronezh from German bombing attacks. During the mission he shot down a Ju 88 and Bf 109, but was subsequently shot down; he was badly burned from the fire inside his plane, but after he parachuted out personnel from the 27th Tank Brigade rescued him; people from the brigade had also witnessed the shootdowns of the enemy planes and captured a German pilot. Smirnov was awarded the Order of Lenin for his performance on the mission.

He was first nominated for the title Hero of the Soviet Union on 6 August 1943 for flying 297 sorties and gaining 13 solo aerial victories; he was a deputy squadron commander at the time. That summer he managed to shoot down three Fw 190s. The title was awarded to him on 28 September 1943.

On 7 October 1943 Smirnov shot down a squadron commander of a group of He-111s. Leading a group of five other P-39s in the attack, he and his crew managed to down a total of six He-111s over the course of 20 minutes. On 9 October 1943 Smirnov shot down four enemy aircraft during three sorties over the course of a single day.

On 5 September 1944 he was nominated for the title Hero of the Soviet Union again for flying 296 sorties and gaining 31 solo victories. As a squadron commander at the time of the nomination, he was awarded a second gold star on 23 February 1945.

By the end of the war he was the deputy commander of his regiment, had flown 457 (Note: Aviation historians Simonov and Bodrikhin report he flew 457 sorties, but Mikhail Bykov incorrectly reports he flew 357 sorties) sorties, shot down one plane in a group, gained 35 solo shootdowns of enemy aircraft, shot down a hot air ballon, and engaged in 72 dogfights. (Note: Other sources report 34 solo and 15 shared shootdowns.) The aircraft he shot down included the Ju 87, Ju 88, He 111, He 126, Fw 189, Fw 190, Bf 109, Me 110, and Me 210.

== Postwar ==
Smirnov remained as the deputy commander of the 28th Guards Fighter Aviation Regiment until March 1947; he then entered training at the Lipetsk Senior Officers Flight Tactical Courses, which he graduated from in November that year. He was then assigned as commander of the 54th Guards Fighter Aviation Regiment, where he flew the P-63. He left the position in April 1949 and took command of the 866th Fighter Aviation Regiment, which used the Yak-3. In February 1950 he relinquished command of the regiment and was made a flight inspector in the Moscow military district. In that position he flew the La-15, MiG-9, MiG-15, MiG-17, Yak-15, and Yak-17. In 1954 he retired from the Air Force, after which he worked as a teacher and projectionist. He died on 7 August 1987 and was buried in the Kuntsevo Cemetery.

== Awards and honors ==
- Twice Hero of the Soviet Union (28 September 1943 and 23 February 1945)
- Two Order of Lenin (14 August 1942 and 28 September 1943)
- Four Order of the Red Banner (3 December 1941, 3 May 1942, 30 April 1943, and 22 February 1955)
- Order of Aleksandr Nevsky (11 October 1943)
- Two Order of the Patriotic War 1st class (15 May 1945 and 11 May 1985)
- Order of the Red Star (3 November 1953)

== Memorials and commemoration ==
A bust of Smirnov was made by Nikolai Tomsky in 1949. A bronze bust of him was installed in Rameshki village, Tver oblast in 1951, and a MiG-23P was named after him in 1985.
