= Rocco Guerrini =

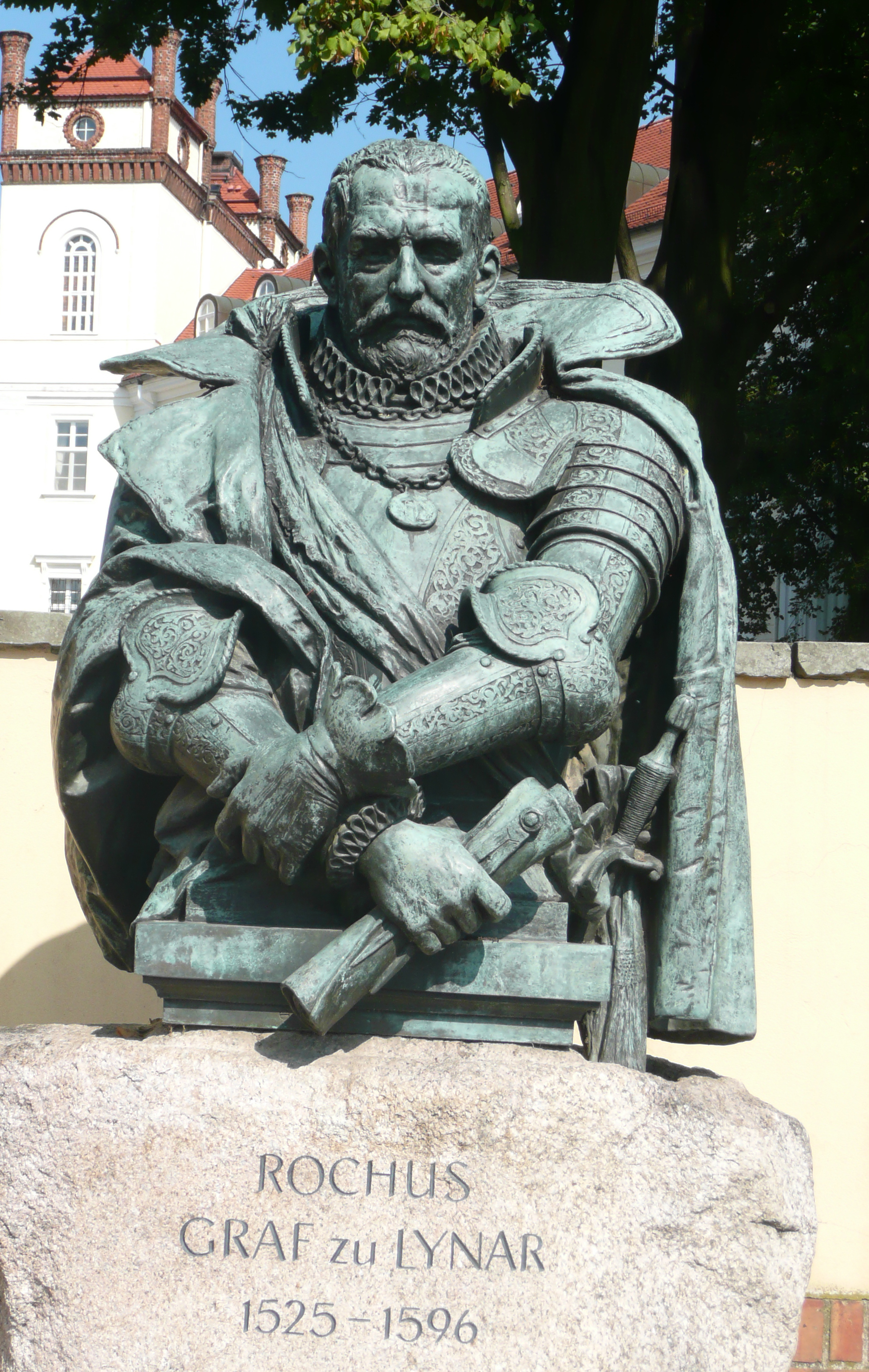
Bust of Guerrini in Lübbenau, Spreewald, Germany

Rocco Guerrini (Latin - Rochus Quirinus; German - Rochus, Graf zu Lynar; 24 December 1525, Marradi - 22 December 1596, Berlin-Spandau) was an Italian military engineer, most notable for his work on the Spandau Citadel, which was completed in 1594. He used the title count of Linari (Marradi) from 1571 onwards and founded the German line of the Linari family, known as the Lynar line.

== Life ==
He came from a noble Florentine family which owned Linari castle in the Lamone valley. Aged ten he became a page at the court of Alessandro de' Medici and then from 1540 at the court of the French dauphin, the future Henry II of France.

He fought in the French army against Spain at the sieges of Metz and Thionville and the Battle of Saint-Quentin. At Thionville in 1558 he was wounded in the face and lost an eye. In 1561 he took part in the construction of Metz Citadel. In 1567 he went to Heidelberg as maréchal de camp to his friend John Casimir of the Palatinate-Simmern.

In 1569 he was made commander in chief of all Augustus I, Elector of Saxony's fortresses and also improved the hydraulic engineering of Dresden, seat of Augustus' court. In 1578 he entered the service of John George, prince of Prussia, succeeding the architect Francesco Chiaramella. He worked on the Spandau Citadel and on the Berlin Palace, where he designed the Pharmacy Wing. On 30 July 1590 he was put in charge of building work at the fortress at Peitz, completed in 1595.
