= House of Soviets (Saint Petersburg) =

- Дом Советов
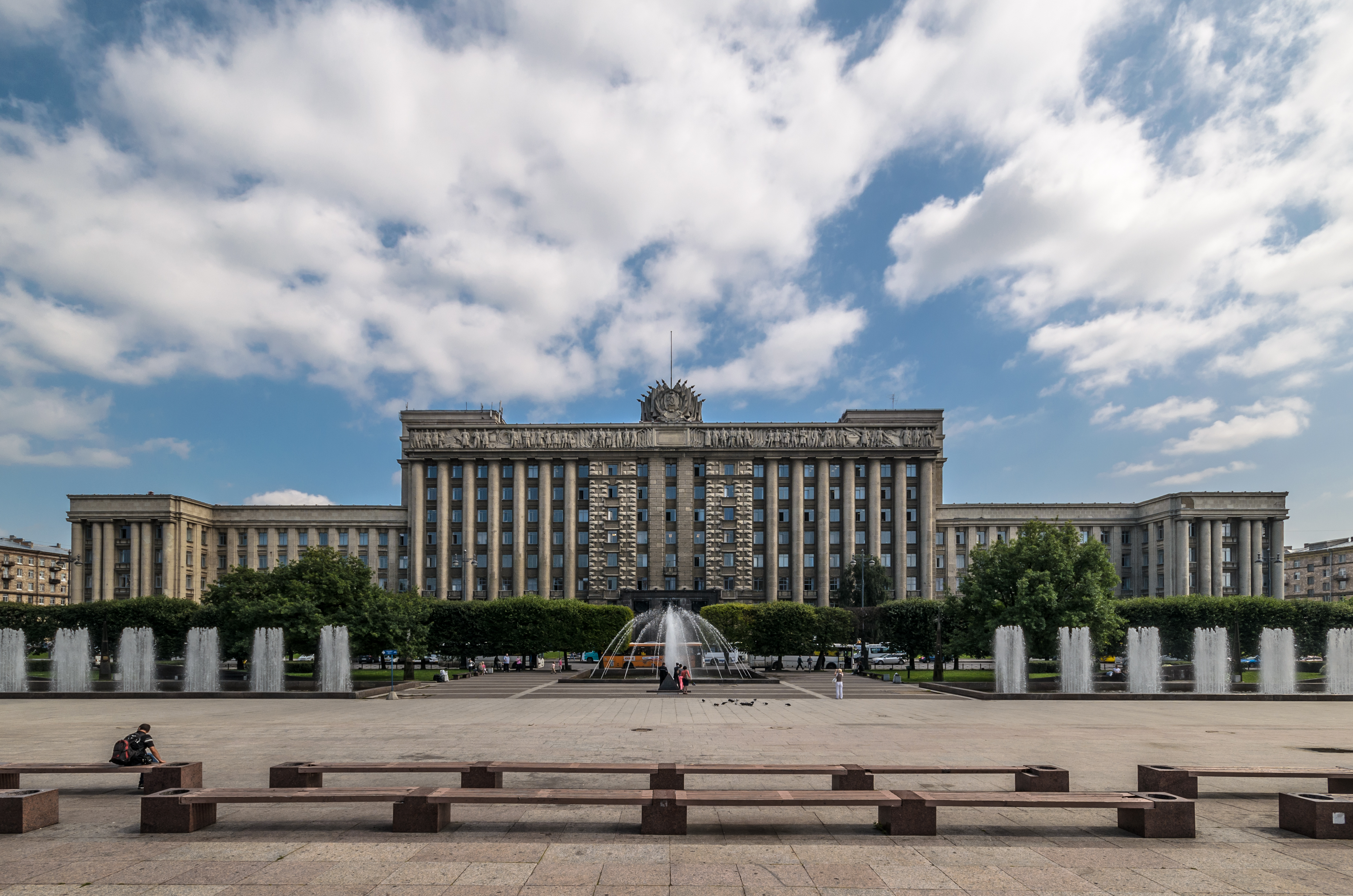
- Main façade of the House of Soviets
- Interactive map of the House of Soviets area

General information
- Type: Office building
- Architectural style: Stalinist architecture
- Location: Saint Petersburg, Russia, Moskovsky Prospekt, 212
- Coordinates: 59°51′08″N 30°19′32″E
- Construction started: 1936
- Completed: 1941
- Owner: JSC "Holding Company Leninets"

Height
- Height: 50 meters

Design and construction
- Architect: Noi Trotsky
- Other designers: Lev Tverskoi, Modest Shepilevsky, Nikolai Tomsky

The House of Soviets (Russian: Дом Советов, Dom Sovetov) is an office building built in Stalinist style in the late 1930s in Saint Petersburg (then Leningrad). It is located in the Moskovsky District of Saint Petersburg. It has been described as "the purest form of totalitarian monumentality".

According to Soviet projects, the House of Soviets was planned to host the administration of Soviet Leningrad government. The location was chosen on undeveloped south outskirts of the city away from the downtown area which was prone to frequent floods. The construction was completed just before the Nazi invasion of the Soviet Union at the beginning of World War II, and the building was never used for the intended purpose. In 1941, it was fortified and used as a local command post for Soviet Red Army during the Siege of Leningrad. Surviving reminders of that stronghold are small bunkers built from a reinforced concrete which still stand at several corners of the House of Soviets. Later, the building housed the Soviet research institute which focused on the design of electronic components for military objects. Among the notable engineers who worked there are two post-World War II defectors from the US, Alfred Sarant and Joel Barr. Currently, the office space in the building is rented out to various businesses.

A square in front of the House of Soviets is called Moscow Square (Moskovskaya Ploshad). During a construction of the subway station Moskovskaya in 1970, the square was remodelled and upgraded with a massive monument to Vladimir Lenin designed by Mikhail Anikushin. In 2006, several fountain features were added at the square.
