= Vasily Svarog =

- Василий Сварог
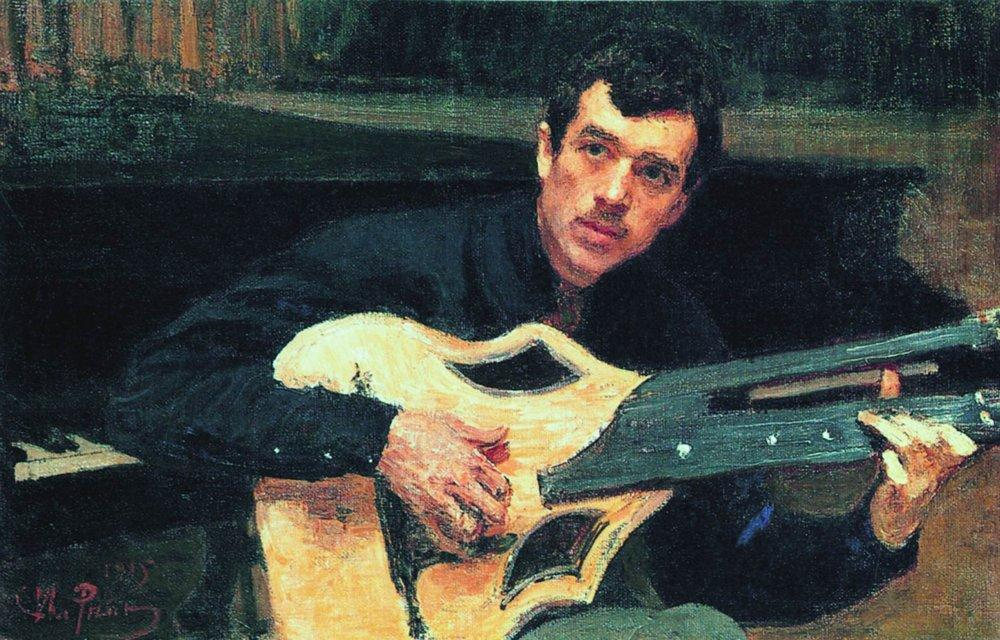
- Portrait by Ilya Repin (1915). National Art Museum in Minsk
- Born: 17 March [O.S. 5 March] 1875; Staraya Russa, Russian Empire
- Died: December 31, 1946 (aged 71); Moscow, Russian SFSR, Soviet Union
- Resting place: Novodevichy Cemetery
- Education: Stieglitz Academy
- Known for: Painting
- Movement: Socialist realism, Landscape painting, Portraits
- Awards: Order of the Red Banner of Labour; Medal "For Valiant Labour in the Great Patriotic War 1941–1945"

Vasily Semyonovich Svarog (Russian: Василий Семёнович Сварог; real name Korochkin; March 5 (17), 1883, Staraya Russa, Russian Empire – December 31, 1946, Moscow, Soviet Union) was a Russian and Soviet artist.

== Biography ==
Vasily Semyonovich Korochkin was born on March 5 (17), 1883, in Staraya Russa, Novgorod Governorate (now Novgorod Oblast), to Semyon, a peasant, and Olga Vasilyevna Korochkin, a laundress. The family lived in a wooden house on Rogachevskaya Street (now Lomonosova Street). Vasily had two sisters: Anna (later a rural teacher) and Nadezhda (later a seamstress). Vasily lost his father at the age of two, and his mother raised the children.

Vasily's passion for drawing was evident from an early age. Having noticed him, Chistyakov, a drawing teacher at the Staraya Russa town school, raised money through a subscription among the town's residents so that the talented child could continue his art education after graduating.

In 1896, at the age of thirteen, Vasily entered the Stieglitz Central School of Technical Drawing in St. Petersburg and successfully graduated four years later. It was during his studies that the artist's pseudonym, "Svarog", emerged. From 1900 onward, he began collaborating with the St. Petersburg illustrated magazines "Picturesque Review of the Countries of the World", "Magic Lantern" and "Sun of Russia" (since 1910). In 1911, Svarog won first prize in a competition organized by the editors of "Sun of Russia" for a series of drawings for Leo Tolstoy's "The Living Corpse".

In 1915, he met Yuri Repin and painted his portrait, which delighted his father, the renowned artist Ilya Repin. This work allowed Svarog to become close to the master and attend his portrait sessions. In 1916, on Repin's recommendation, he joined the Society of the Itinerants and began exhibiting his works at the Traveling Exhibitions. In 1916, he painted "Portrait of a Mother" (oil on canvas), which won first prize at the spring Traveling Exhibition.

In 1918, he actively participated in decorating Petrograd for the celebration of the first anniversary of the October Revolution. The artist himself said that he "worked especially intensively, since these great events demanded a great deal of effort from everyone". During this time, he created portraits of Karl Marx, Friedrich Engels, Vladimir Lenin, Moisei Uritsky and V. Volodarsky.

From 1919 to 1922, due to his mother's serious illness, he lived in Staraya Russa. There, he organized the People's House, created an art studio, amateur choral and orchestral groups, and an amateur opera theater, which staged Dargomyzhsky's "Rusalka", Rachmaninoff's "Aleko", Gounod's "Faust", and others. During this period, Svarog painted many paintings dedicated to the city and its inhabitants—"Portrait of Vasily Ushakov", "Children" (exhibited at the Tretyakov Gallery), "Portrait of Valentina Kazarina", "Rogachevka" and others.

In 1923, he joined the Association of Artists of Revolutionary Russia.

In 1925, he received a silver medal at the World's Fair in Paris for his album "9 January", for which he completed 11 large drawings.

During the Soviet period, Svarog's work acquired a strong political focus. The artist himself called his genre "political composition". Some paintings were based on personal impressions, others on newspaper reports:

- "Heroic Pilots in the Kremlin Before Flight" (1934);
- "Meeting the Chelyuskin Ships on Red Square" (1934);
- "Portrait of Kuibyshev on the Tribune" (1935);
- "May Day - Pioneers" (1937);
- "Sedovites on Red Square" (1940);
- "Portrait of Tchaikovsky" (1940);
- "Portrait of Mayakovsky" (1940);
- "Comrades Voroshilov and Gorky at the Central House of the Red Army Shooting Range" (1932);
- "Volkhovstroy";
- "Kuznetskstroy";
- "Dneprostroy" and others.

Passionate about music, Svarog created a number of works united by this theme:

- "Still Life with a Guitar" (1934);
- "Torban" (1939);
- a portrait of the guitarist Shaumyan (1928);
- a watercolor portrait of the Spanish guitarist Andrés Segovia (1927).

Svarog also painted portraits of party and government leaders including Stalin, Voroshilov, and Kuibyshev.

In 1940, the Political Directorate of the Moscow Military District united professional war artists into the Grekov Studio of War Artists, based at the Art Workshops of Amateur Red Army Art. The studio was tasked with the cultural and political education of soldiers and depicting the army's heroic combat history. Vasily Svarog was appointed director, creating a number of paintings on military themes:

- "Council of Commanders";
- "Smolny in October";
- "The Capture of the Winter Palace";
- "The Boat Voyage of the Commanders' Wives".

From 1941 onward, he was evacuated—first to Nalchik, then to Tbilisi. In May 1942, an exhibition of his paintings was held in Tbilisi.

In 1942, he completed his final painting, the multi-figure composition "Stepan Razin". In October 1942, while returning from evacuation to Moscow, at the Samarkand Station, while crossing the tracks with his suitcases, Vasily Svarog tripped and hit his left temple on a rail. On October 10, he was transported to Moscow in serious condition. After treatment, he was unable to return to painting.

Vasily Svarog died on December 31, 1946. He is buried at the Novodevichy Cemetery (section 2, row 40, site 6). The tombstone on Svarog's grave was executed by his student, People's Artist of the USSR Nikolai Tomsky.

In 1948, through the efforts of the artist's friends and his wife, Larisa Semyonovna Svarog, a posthumous exhibition of his works was held. It featured paintings, portraits, and sketches from the collections of the State Tretyakov Gallery, the State Historical Museum, the Central House of the Soviet Army, the Pushkin Museum and Gorky Museum, the Academy of Arts of the Soviet Union and regional museums.
