= Lenin Monument (Berlin) =

Lenin Monument by Nikolai Tomsky

- Lenin-Denkmal (German)
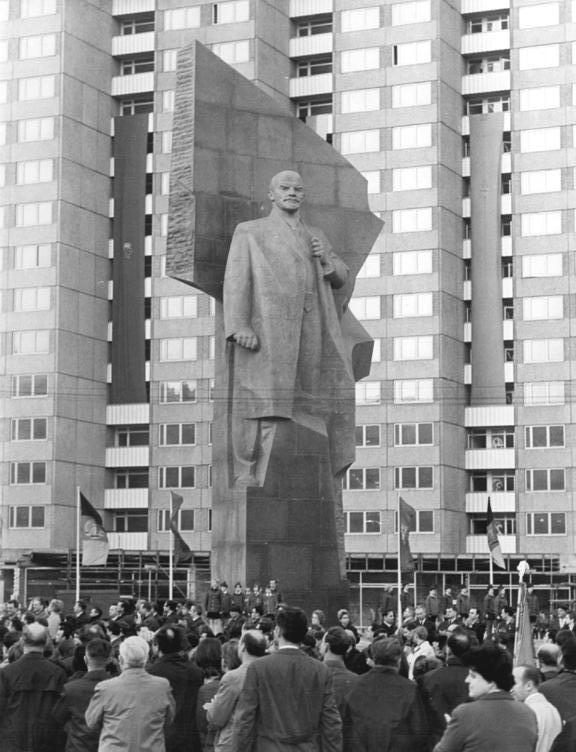
- The monument in May 1970, shortly after its inauguration
- Artist: Nikolai Tomsky
- Year: 1970
- Medium: Granite
- Subject: Vladimir Lenin
- Dimensions: 19 metres (62 ft) (height)
- Condition: Dismantled

The Lenin Monument (German: Lenin-Denkmal) was a monument to Vladimir Lenin in East Berlin created by the Soviet Russian sculptor Nikolai Tomsky. It was inaugurated on April 19, 1970 to commemorate the 100th anniversary of Lenin's birth. After German reunification, the district council of Friedrichshain voted for its removal despite demonstrations and petitions from neighborhood residents and preservationists. The demolition process began in November 1991, and by February 1992 the monument was completely dismantled and its fragments buried on the outskirts of Berlin. In 2015, the head of the statue was excavated, and since 2016 it has been on display at Berlin’s Spandau Citadel as part of a permanent exhibition of Berlin political monuments.

== Background ==
The monument was created by Nikolai Tomsky, a Soviet Russian sculptor who is responsible for a number of monumental statues dedicated to Russian historical figures, including several monuments to Lenin. At the time of the monument’s unveiling, Tomsky was the President of the USSR Academy of Arts. Local artists objected to the choice of Tomsky to complete the commission, drawing comparisons between the monumental style he specialized in and Nazi-era aesthetics.

The 19-meter tall statue was carved from red granite and depicted Lenin standing in front of a flag. The opposite side featured a relief of German and Soviet workers shaking hands. The statue was conceived to stand in front of a new housing project in Friedrichshain designed by prominent architect Hermann Henselmann. The plaza where the monument was placed, Lenin Square (German: Leninplatz), was previously dedicated in 1950.

== Dedication ==
The dedication ceremony took place on April 19, 1970 to commemorate the 100th anniversary of Lenin’s birth, and was attended by 200,000 people. East German leader Walter Ulbricht and Soviet Ambassador Peter Abrassimov both made speeches at the event, with Abrassimov referring to the monument as a symbol of East German and Soviet unity.

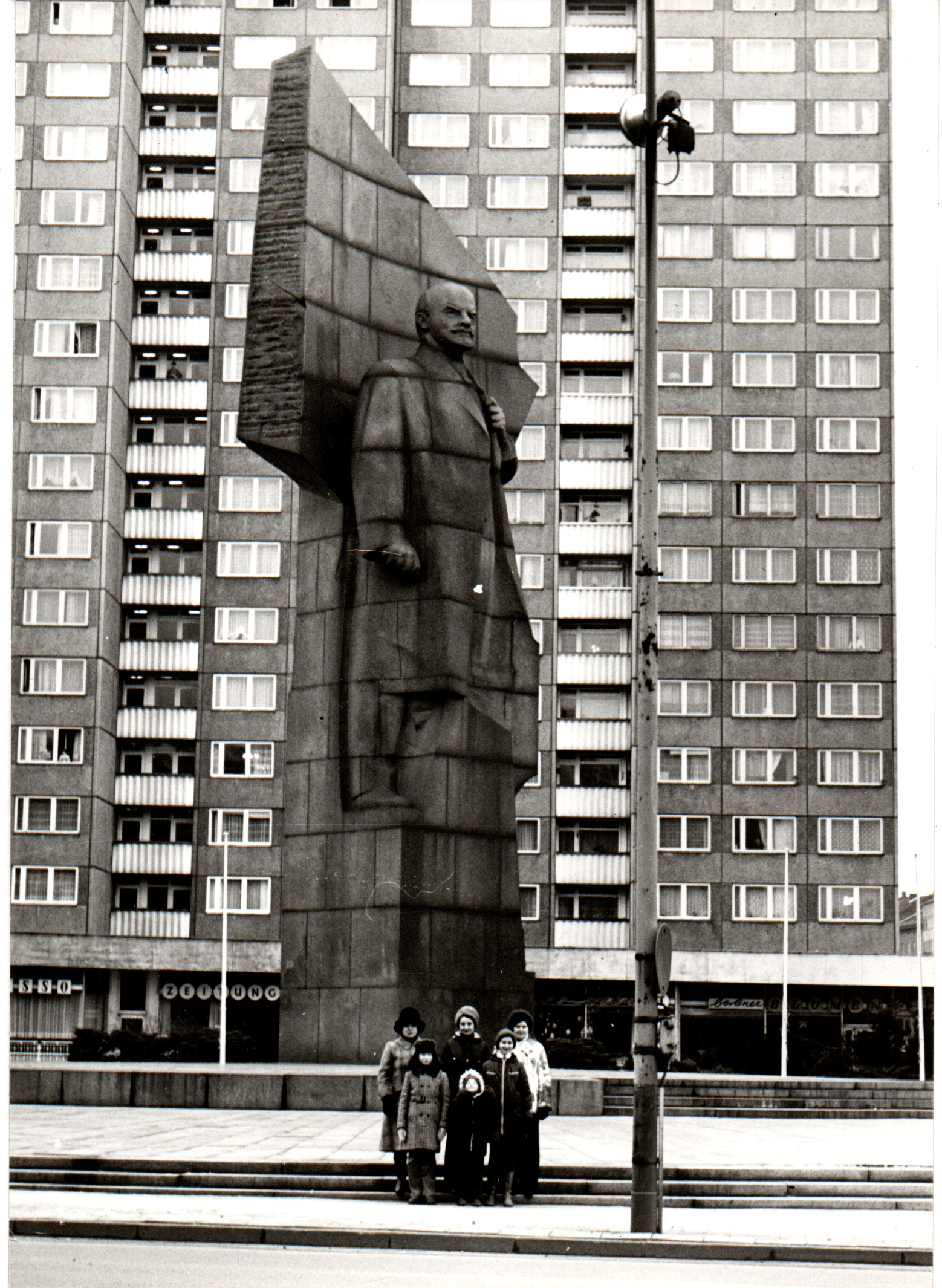
Памятник Ленину в Берлине 1982

== Debate and removal ==
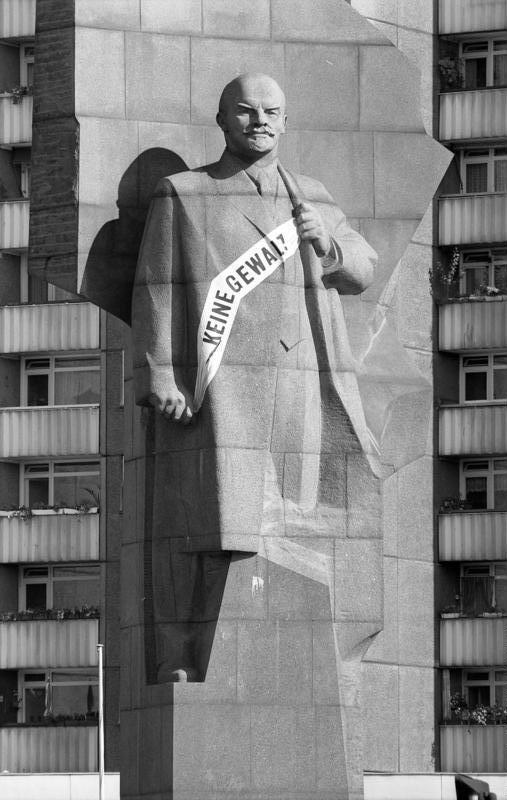
The monument in 1991 with a banner from a protest group reading "No Violence"

After the reunification of Germany in 1989, the monument became the subject of controversy. Vandals frequently targeted the monument and on September 19, 1991, the district council of Friedrichshain voted to dismantle the monument. Within a month, the city council of Berlin removed the statue from the list of officially protected monuments, clearing the way for demolition.

Supporters of the monument included art students, town planners, preservationists, local residents, and left-wing political parties. They argued that the statue should be preserved as a reminder of history, and that the removal of the monument without input from the community was an authoritarian overreach by the government. To demonstrate their opposition to the monument’s removal, they circulated petitions, staged peaceful protests, and held vigils. Tomsky’s widow also unsuccessfully challenged the monument’s removal in court.

Those in favor of removing the monument criticized the historical legacy of Lenin and characterized the statue’s demolition as a continuation of the revolution of 1989. The mayor of Berlin at the time, Eberhard Diepgen, called the demolition the end of a “despot and murderer.”

The dismantling process officially began on November 8, 1991, the eve of the second anniversary of the fall of the Berlin Wall. Removing the monument cost 500,000 DM and was made difficult by the size and weight of the statue. The monument was completely removed by February 1992 and buried in 129 pieces in a wooded area outside Berlin.

After the monument was removed, Lenin Square was renamed United Nations Square (German: Platz der Vereinten Nationen). A small fountain representing the five inhabited continents was installed where the base of the statue once stood.

== Exhibition ==
In 2009, the Spandau Citadel requested permission from the Berlin City Council to excavate the head of the monument. The council initially refused, then later reversed its decision, and in September 2015 the head was unearthed. Since April 2016 it has been displayed at the Citadel as part of the permanent exhibition ‘Unveiled: Berlin and Its Monuments.'

== Location ==
The former Leninplatz is located in the locality of Friedrichshain in the borough of Friedrichshain-Kreuzberg.

The plaza is located north of the Strausberger Platz. It is bounded by the Friedenstraße to the north and east, and the Palisadenstraße and the Lichtenberger Straße to the south and west. The plaza is intersected by the Mollstraße–Landsberger Allee in a west-east direction.

The plaza can be reached via the tram lines M5, M6 and M8 at the Platz der Vereinten Nationen stop, as well as the U-bahn line U5 at the Strausberger Platz station.

== See also ==
- List of statues of Vladimir Lenin
- Good Bye, Lenin! (2003 film)
