= Ivan Kozhedub =

Aviator, thrice Hero of the Soviet Union (1920–1991)

- Іван Микитович Кожедуб
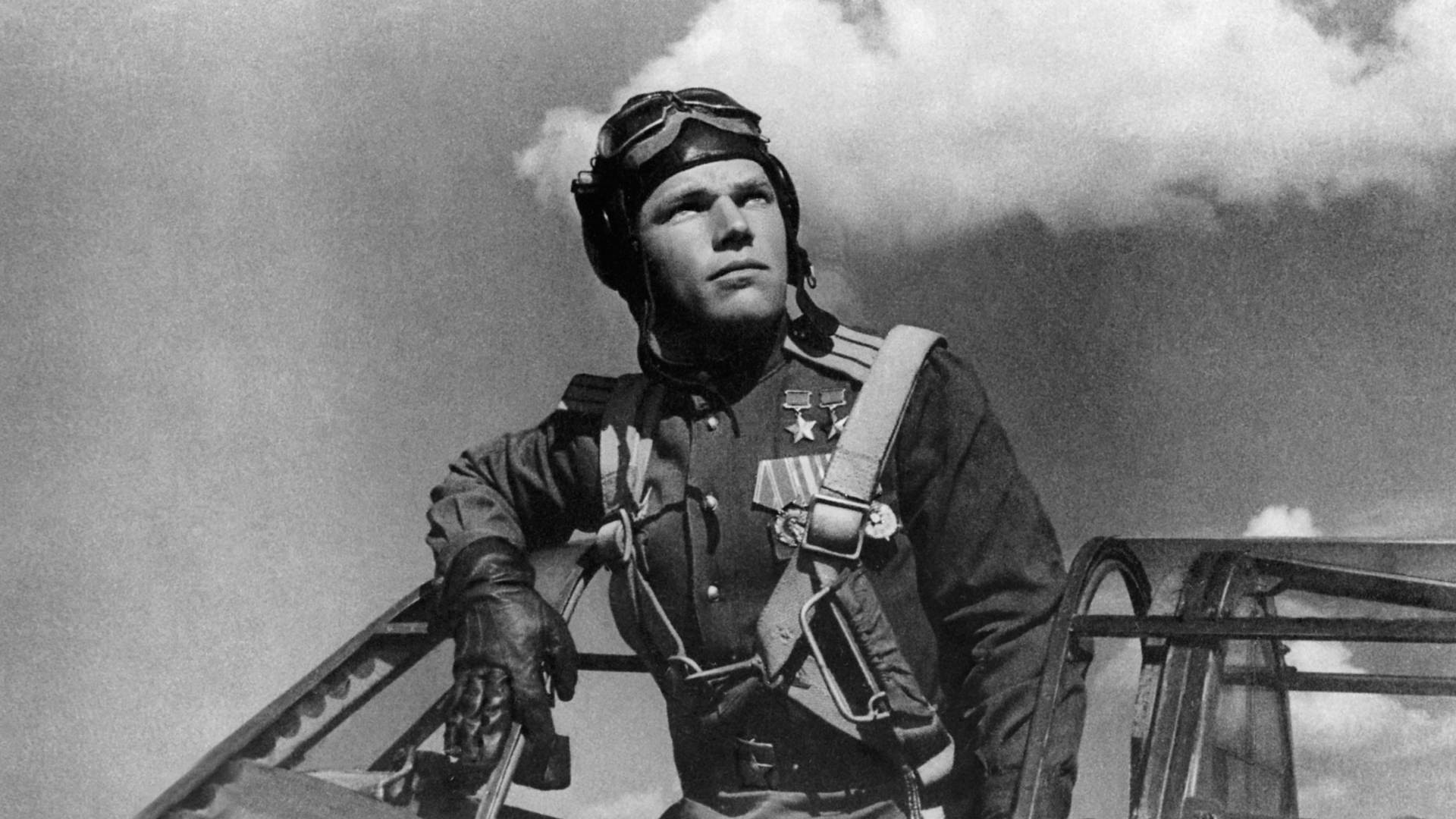
- Kozhedub during WWII
- Born: 8 June 1920; Obrazhiivka, Chernigov Governorate, Ukrainian SSR
- Died: 8 August 1991 (aged 71); Moscow, Russian SFSR, Soviet Union
- Burial place: Novodevichy Cemetery
- Military career
- Allegiance: Soviet Union
- Branch: Soviet Air Force
- Service years: 1940–1985
- Rank: Marshal of Aviation
- Nicknames: Батя ("Dad"), Борода ("Beard")
- Conflicts: World War II; Battle of Kursk; Korean War
- Awards: Hero of the Soviet Union (thrice)

Marshal of Aviation Ivan Nikitovich Kozhedub (Russian: Иван Hикитович Кожедуб; Ukrainian: Іван Микитович Кожедуб, romanized: Ivan Mykytovych Kozhedub; 8 June 1920 – 8 August 1991) was a Soviet aviator who first came to prominence as a World War II fighter ace. Universally credited with over 60 solo victories, he is considered to be the highest scoring Soviet and Allied fighter pilot of World War II. Kozhedub is one of the few pilots confirmed to have shot down a Messerschmitt Me 262 jet, and the first Soviet pilot to have done so. He was made a Hero of the Soviet Union on three occasions (4 February 1944, 19 August 1944, and 18 August 1945). After World War II, he remained in the military and went on to command the 324th Fighter Aviation Division during Soviet operations in the Korean War.

During the remainder of his military career, Kozhedub accumulated additional titles as a deputy of the Supreme Soviet of the USSR (1946-1962) and as Chairman of the Federation of Aviation Sports (1967-1987). He was promoted to Marshal of Aviation in 1985 and retired later that year, concluding 45 years of service in the Soviet Air Forces. Kozhedub lived in Moscow until he died in 1991, and was buried in Novodevichy cemetery.

== Early life ==
Kozhedub was born on 8 June 1920 to a Ukrainian family in the village of Obrazhiivka, in Chernigov Governorate, located within what is now Shostka Raion of Ukraine's Sumy Oblast. After graduating from his seventh grade of school in his hometown in 1934 he went on to complete two more years of school in Shostka. There he initially worked as a librarian until completing his ninth grade of school in 1936, and from that year to 1940 he attended the Shostka Chemical Technology College. In addition to his studies, he attended training at the local aeroclub, from which he graduated in 1939. He subsequently joined the Red Army in February 1940, and in January 1941 he graduated from training at the Chuhuiv Military Aviation School of Pilots, where he initially learned to fly the UT-2, UTI-4, and I-16. Remaining at the school as a flight instructor, he continued to train pilots after the school was forced to evacuate to Shymkent in the autumn of 1941 due to the German invasion of the Soviet Union. He was sent to Moscow in November 1942, where was posted to the 240th Fighter Aviation Regiment, but he did not arrive on the warfront until March 1943 when the 302nd Fighter Aviation Division was deployed to the Voronezh Front.

== World War II ==
Despite having started in the regiment as a regular pilot, he quickly mastered the new La-5 and was promoted to flight commander. He opened his tally on 6 July 1943 with the shootdown of a Ju 87 dive bomber. Kozhedub became friends with Kirill Yevstigneev, an accomplished flying ace; although they did not often fly together, Kozhedub acquired many of his tactics and, in a spirit of competition, they shared their experiences using different techniques. Vasily Mukhin, who often flew as Kozhedub's wingman, also went on to become a flying ace.

Over the next few months Kozhedub steadily gained more aerial victories and a promotion to squadron commander, but in the first half of October he rapidly increased his tally with 14 shootdowns. On 10 October 1943 he was nominated for the title Hero of the Soviet Union for flying 146 sorties, engaging in 27 aerial battles, and totaling 20 aerial victories; he was awarded the title on 4 February 1944.

In July 1944 the 240th Fighter Regiment was honored with the Guards designation and renamed the 178th Fighter Aviation Regiment, and Kozhedub was nominated for a second gold star for 46 aerial victories across 256 sorties. He did not stay with his regiment much longer, though, having been reassigned as the deputy commander of the 176th Guards Fighter Aviation Regiment, a special "free-hunting" regiment equipped with the new Lavochkin La-7 fighter, per the initiative of Chief Marshal of Aviation Aleksandr Novikov. There, he was rarely assigned such specific missions as escorting other aircraft or providing air support for troops, enabling him and his subordinates to tally more aerial victories. In mid-February 1945, during a free-hunting mission in an area south of Frankfurt with his wingman Dmitry Titarenko, Kozhedub shot down an Me 262 jet, thereby becoming the first Soviet pilot to do so. When Kozhedub and Titarenko encountered the Me 262, Kozhedub quickly accelerated from low to full speed; when the Me 262 banked left and slowed — spooked by tracer rounds fired by Titarenko — Kozhedub shot it down. (Note: Sources differ as to if he shot down the Me 262 on 17 or 19 February 1945)

By the end of the war, Kozhedub tallied 330 sorties, had engaged in 120 dogfights, and had shot down 64 enemy aircraft. (Note: Some sources report 62 aerial victories, while others report as many as 94 shootdowns, but the consensus among aviation historians is that he shot down 64 enemy aircraft.) Having gained all his aerial victories on the La-5F, La-5FN, and La-7, he expressed his strong preference for Lavochkin fighters, and met with Semyon Lavochkin to comment on various aspects of the fighters' designs. Having been nominated for a third gold star in May 1945, he became thrice a Hero of the Soviet Union on 18 August 1945, and remained deputy commander of the 176th Guards Fighter Aviation Regiment based in Schönwalde until September that year.

Preferring short, intense attacks to stun and bring down enemy aircraft, one favorite technique he developed and used in the war involved darting at a target from below and subsequently opening fire only when extremely close. Kozhedub used this tactic very successfully against the Ju 87 dive bomber, gaining him an unsurpassed 18 shootdowns of the type (equal with Arseny Vorozheykin). However, being so risky, the manoeuvre was neither promoted nor taught to young pilots. Though never shot down throughout the war, Kozhedub did experience several close calls. He nevertheless always managed to land his airplane, regardless of damage.

== Post-war era ==
Kozhedub, August 1945

Upon returning to the USSR, Kozhedub attended the Air Force Academy, based in Monino, graduating in May 1949. He was originally to be posted as deputy commander of the 31st Fighter Aviation Division based in Baku, but — per orders 'from above' owing to his high status as a top flying ace — he was reassigned to the 324th Fighter Aviation Division. He initially served as assistant commander for flight training, but was soon promoted to command of the division in November 1950. Shortly thereafter the unit was sent to China, where they initially trained Chinese and North Korean pilots. Kozhedub, despite being one of the first pilots to master the MiG-15 fighter jet back in 1949, was strictly forbidden from participating in combat sorties by order of his commanding officers. His division consisted of only two regiments (the 176th Guards and 196th Fighter Aviation Regiments), rather than the usual three. Nevertheless, pilots of his division claimed 216 aerial victories in Korea from April 1951 to February 1952, while sustaining only 27 MiG-15 losses and nine pilots killed.

Upon its return to the Soviet Union in February 1952, the 324th Fighter Division was stationed in Kaluga as an air defense unit. The following year he was promoted to the rank of major-general, and in February 1955 attended the High Command Academy, graduating in 1956. He then served as deputy head of the air force's combat-training and frontline aviation-training directorates. Having become the 1st deputy commander of the 76th Air Army in April 1958, he visited Cuba alongside the unit's commander Viktor Davidkov from 1962 to 1963. From 1964 to February 1971 he served as 1st deputy commander of the air force of the Moscow Military District, although he ceased flying in 1969. From 1971 to 1978 he served as deputy chief of combat training of the air force, and subsequently became a military advisor in the Ministry of Defense; in 1985 he was promoted to the rank of Marshal of Aviation. During his career as a pilot, he totaled 1937 flight hours, piloting the Yak-3, Yak-11, Yak-17, Yak-28, MiG-15, MiG-17, MiG-21, Li-2, and Il-14 airplanes and the Mi-4 and Mi-8 helicopters.

Beyond his military duties, he served as a deputy of the Supreme Soviet of the USSR from 1946 to 1962 and chairman of the Federation of Aviation Sports from 1967 to 1987.

He resided in Moscow for the rest of his life, where he died of a heart attack on 8 August 1991 and was buried in the Novodevichy cemetery.

== List of aerial victories ==
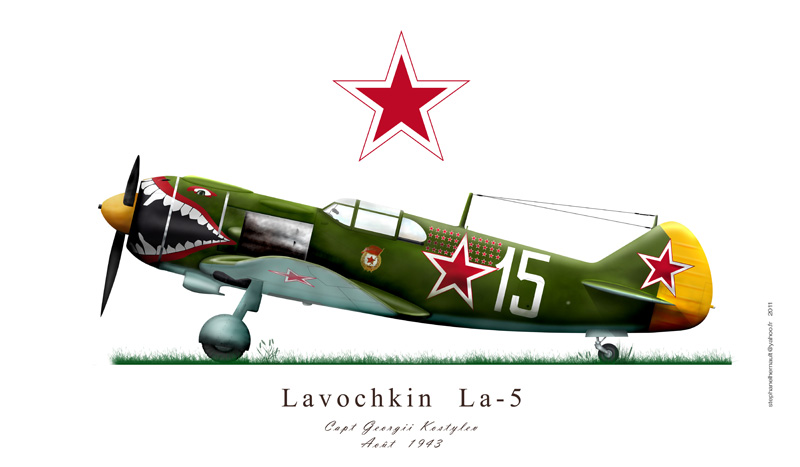
Lavochkin La-5, operated in 1943–1944

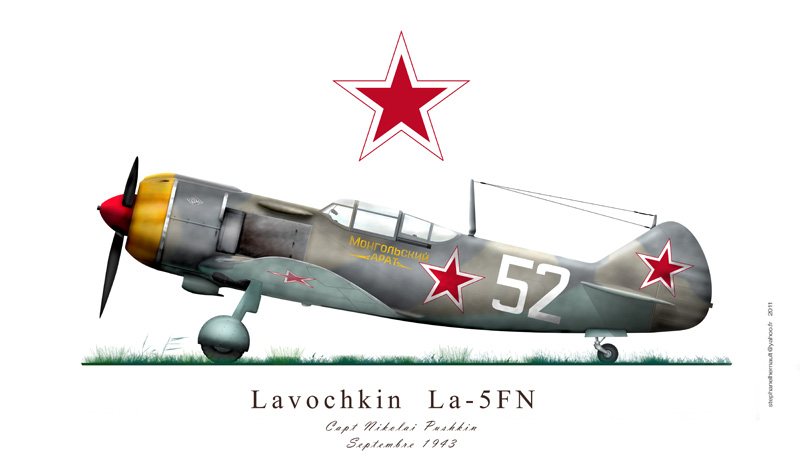
Lavochkin La-5FN, operated in 1944

According to Soviet aces 1941–1945. The victories of Stalin's Falcons (Russian: Советские асы 1941—1945. Победы сталинских соколов) by Mikhail Bykov.

##	Date	A/c type	Location
1	6 July 1943	Ju 87	west of Zavidivka
2	7 July 1943	Ju 87	Gostishchevo station
3	9 July 1943	Bf 109	Krasna Polyana
4	9 July 1943	Bf 109	east of Pokrovka
5	9 August 1943	Bf 109	Prelestny
6	14 August 1943	Bf 109	Iskrivka
7	14 August 1943	Bf 109	Kolomna
8	16 August 1943	Ju 87	Rohan
9	22 August 1943	Fw 190	Liubotyn
10	9 September 1943	Bf 109	north of Iskrivka
11	30 September 1943	Ju 87	south-west of Borodayivka
12	1 October 1943	Ju 87	west of Borodayivka
13	1 October 1943	Ju 87	west of Borodayivka
14	2 October 1943	Bf 109	Ploskoye
15	2 October 1943	Ju 87	Petrivka
16	2 October 1943	Ju 87	south-west of Andriivka
17	2 October 1943	Ju 87	south-west of Andriivka
18	4 October 1943	Bf 109	north-west of Borodayivka
19	5 October 1943	Bf 109	south-west of Krasny Kut
20	5 October 1943	Bf 109	west of Kutsevalivka
21	6 October 1943	Bf 109	Borodayivka
22	10 October 1943	Bf 109	Dnsprovo-Kamyanka
23	12 October 1943	Ju 87	north of Ploske
24	12 October 1943	Bf 109	south of Petrivka
25	12 October 1943	Ju 87	south of Domotkan
26	29 October 1943	Ju 87	Kryvyi Rih
27	29 October 1943	He 111	west of Budivka
28	16 January 1944	Bf 109	Novo-Zlynka
29	30 January 1944	Bf 109	east of Nechayivka
30	30 January 1944	Ju 87	west of Lipivka
31	14 March 1944	Ju 87	Osiyivka
32	21 March 1944	Ju 87	Lebedyn — Shpola
33	11 April 1944	PZL P.24	Syrka
34	19 April 1944	He 111	north of Iaşi
35	28 April 1944	Ju 87	south-east of Vulturu
36	29 April 1944	Hs 129	Horleşti
37	29 April 1944	Hs 129	Horleşti
38	3 May 1944	Ju 87	Târgu Frumos — Dumbrăviţa
39	31 May 1944	Fw 190	east of Vulturu
40	1 June 1944	Ju 87	Cuza Vodă
41	2 June 1944	Hs 129	west of Stânca
42	3 June 1944	Fw 190	Rediu Ului — Tătăr
43	3 June 1944	Fw 190	Rediu Ului — Tătăr
44	3 June 1944	Fw 190	north-west of Iaşi
45	7 June 1944	Bf 109	Pârliţa
46	8 June 1944	Bf 109	Cârpiţi
47	22 September 1944	Fw 190	north-west of Strenči
48	22 September 1944	Fw 190	south-west of Rāmnieki — Daksti
49	25 September 1944	Fw 190	north-west of Valmiera
50	16 January 1945	Fw 190	south of Studziana
51	10 February 1945	Fw 190	north-west of Mohrin airfield
52	12 February 1945	Fw 190	west of Kinitz
53	12 February 1945	Fw 190	west of Kinitz
54	12 February 1945	Fw 190	Kietzer See Lake
55	17 February 1945	Me 262	east of Alt Friedland
56	19 February 1945	Bf 109	north of Fürstenfelde
57	11 March 1945	Fw 190	north of Brünchen
58	18 March 1945	Fw 190	north of Küstrin
59	18 March 1945	Fw 190	north-west of Küstrin
60	22 March 1945	Fw 190	north of Seelow
61	22 March 1945	Fw 190	east of Gusow
62	23 March 1945	Fw 190	Werbig station
63	17 April 1945	Fw 190	Wriezen
64	17 April 1945	Fw 190	Kinitz

- Until August 1944 Kozhedub was flying on Lavochkin La-5, after that Lavochkin La-7.

=== Alleged shootdown of two USAAF P-51 fighters ===
Russian historian Nikolay Bodrikhin, in Loyalty to the Motherland, Seeking the Fight (2006) and elsewhere, claims that while over Berlin on April 17, 1945 Kozhedub encountered a group of American B-17 Flying Fortresses under attack by Luftwaffe aircraft, and their P-51 escort mistook him for the enemy. Following this he claims that Kozhedub, having no other option, defended himself by shooting down two of the P-51s.

However the original releases of Kozhedub's autobiography, Loyalty to the Motherland, make no such claims while still discussing other events of the day. Furthermore, footage that Bodrikhin presented as being Kozhedub's gun camera film was shot using Zeiss equipment, which was used primarily by the Luftwaffe. Furthermore he claims that the pilot of one of the P-51s was African American, but the only P-51 squadron that included African Americans reported no losses and was not deployed in the vicinity of Berlin on April 17, 1945. Bodrikhin's 2010 book shows frames of the film with English instead of German writing, and changed the claimed date to March 18, 1945 with no explanation of these discrepancies.

== Awards and honors ==
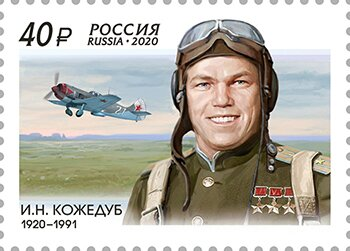
Kozhedub on a 2020 stamp of Russia

Soviet Union

- Thrice Hero of the Soviet Union (4 February 1944, 19 August 1944, and 18 August 1945)
- Two Order of Lenin (4 February 1944 and 21 February 1978)
- Seven Order of the Red Banner (22 July 1943, 30 September 1943, 29 March 1945, 29 June 1945, 2 June 1951, 22 February 1958, and 26 June 1970)
- Order of Alexander Nevsky (31 July 1945)
- Order of the Patriotic War 1st class (11 March 1985)
- Two Order of the Red Star (4 June 1955 and 20 October 1955)
- Order "For Service to the Homeland in the Armed Forces of the USSR", 2nd degree (22 February 1990)
- Order "For Service to the Homeland in the Armed Forces of the USSR", 3rd degree (30 April 1975)
- Medal "For Battle Merit"
- Medal "For the Liberation of Warsaw" (1945)
- Medal "For the Capture of Berlin" (1945)
- Medal "For the Victory over Germany in the Great Patriotic War 1941–1945" (1945)
- Jubilee Medal "Twenty Years of Victory in the Great Patriotic War 1941–1945" (1965)
- Jubilee Medal "Thirty Years of Victory in the Great Patriotic War 1941–1945" (1975)
- Jubilee Medal "Forty Years of Victory in the Great Patriotic War 1941–1945" (1985)
- Jubilee Medal "In Commemoration of the 100th Anniversary of the Birth of Vladimir Ilyich Lenin" (1969)
- Medal "Veteran of the Armed Forces of the USSR" (1976)
- Medal "For Strengthening of Brotherhood in Arms"
- Medal "For Impeccable Service", 1st class
- Jubilee Medal "30 Years of the Soviet Army and Navy" (1948)
- Jubilee Medal "40 Years of the Armed Forces of the USSR" (1957)
- Jubilee Medal "50 Years of the Armed Forces of the USSR" (1967)
- Jubilee Medal "60 Years of the Armed Forces of the USSR" (1978)
- Jubilee Medal "70 Years of the Armed Forces of the USSR" (1988)
- Medal "In Commemoration of the 800th Anniversary of Moscow" (1947)
- Medal "In Commemoration of the 1500th Anniversary of Kiev" (1982)

Foreign

- Medal of Sino-Soviet Friendship (China)
- Patriotic Order of Merit, Bronze, 3rd class (East Germany)
- Order of the Red Banner (Mongolia)
- Medal "50 Years of the Mongolian People's Army" (Mongolia)
- Order of the National Flag, 3rd class (North Korea)
- Order of Freedom and Independence, 1st class (North Korea)
- Knight's Cross of the Order of Polonia Restituta (Poland)

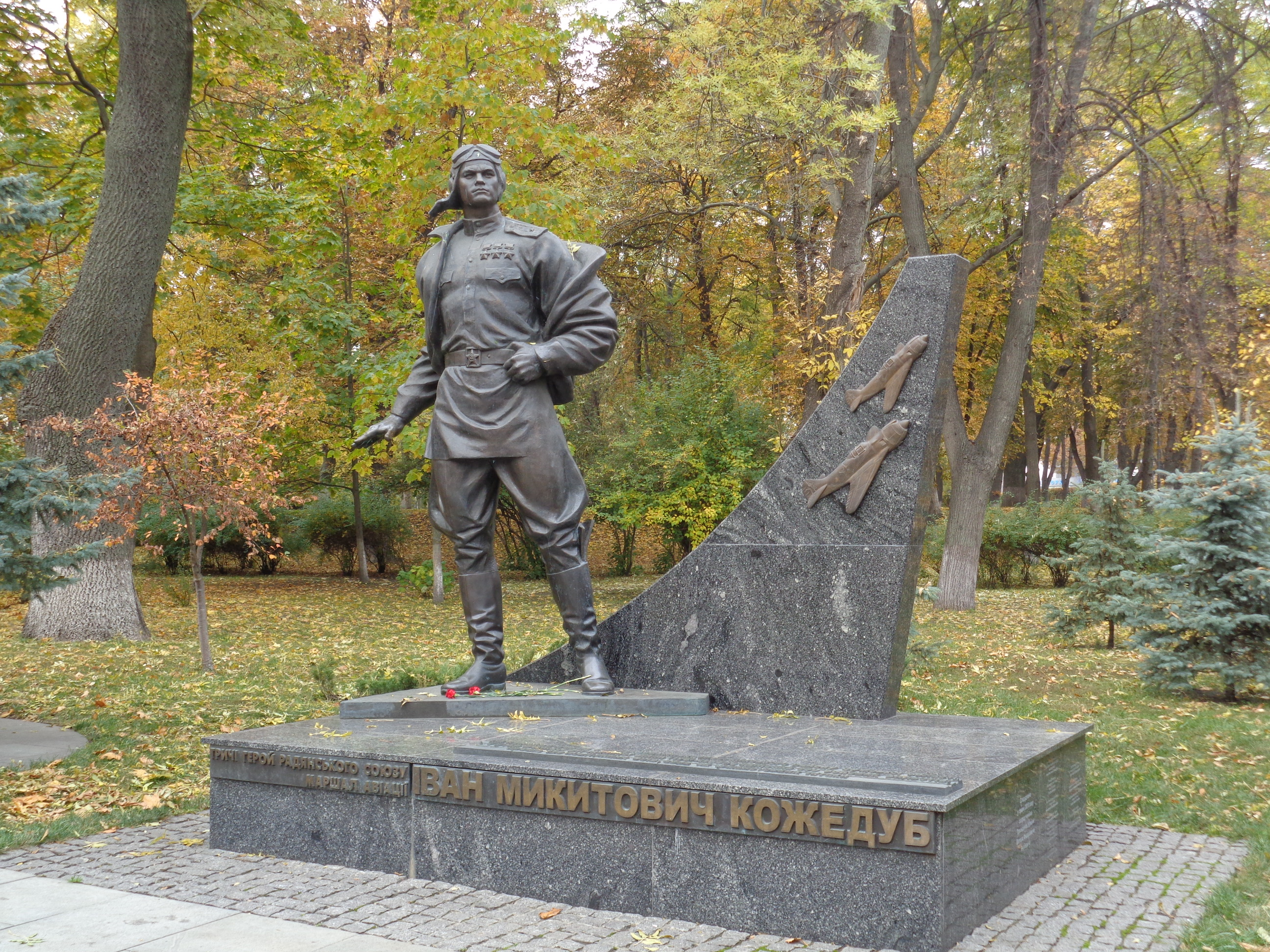
Monument to Ivan Kozhedub in the city of Kyiv

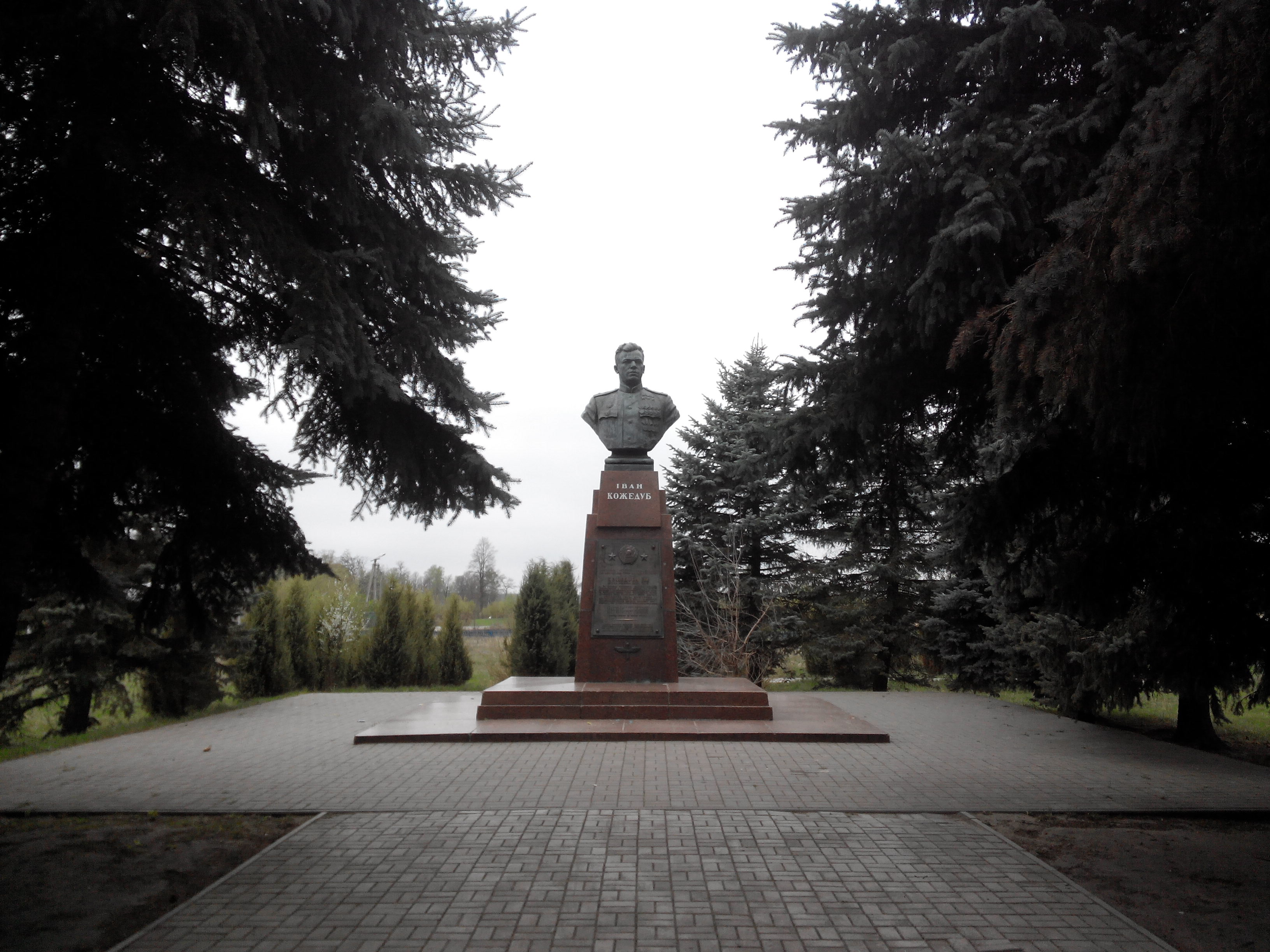
Bust of Ivan Kozhedub in his native village Obrazhiivka

== Legacy ==
A military university in Kharkiv is named in his honor, the Kozhedub University of the Air Force.

On 8 May 2010 a monument to Ivan Kozhedub was opened in Slavy Park in Kyiv.

Ivan Kozhedub Street in the cities of Bila Tserkva, Bucha, Vinnytsia, Dnipro, Zaporizhzhia, Kyiv, Lutsk, Cherkasy, Chuhuiv, Shpola.

There is Ivan Kozhedub Lane in the cities of Kremenchuk and Kropyvnytskyi.

In December 2022 the Kyiv City Council renamed, "with the aim of decolonizing the capital's toponymy", the Mikhail Kutuzov Street in Kyiv's Desnianskyi District Ivan Kozhedub Street.

A bust of Kozhedub made by Nikolai Tomsky was installed in his native village in 1949.

There is a statue of him in Sumy made by Oleg Prokopchuk. A sculpture of him made by Aleksandr Shlapak, Yevgeny Karpov Sr, and Yevgeny Karpov Jr was installed in Kiev in 2013.

On 13 February 2024, in the city of Zhmerynka, Vilinskii Lane was renamed Ivan Kozhedub Lane.
