= Bolshoy Dom =

- Большой Дом
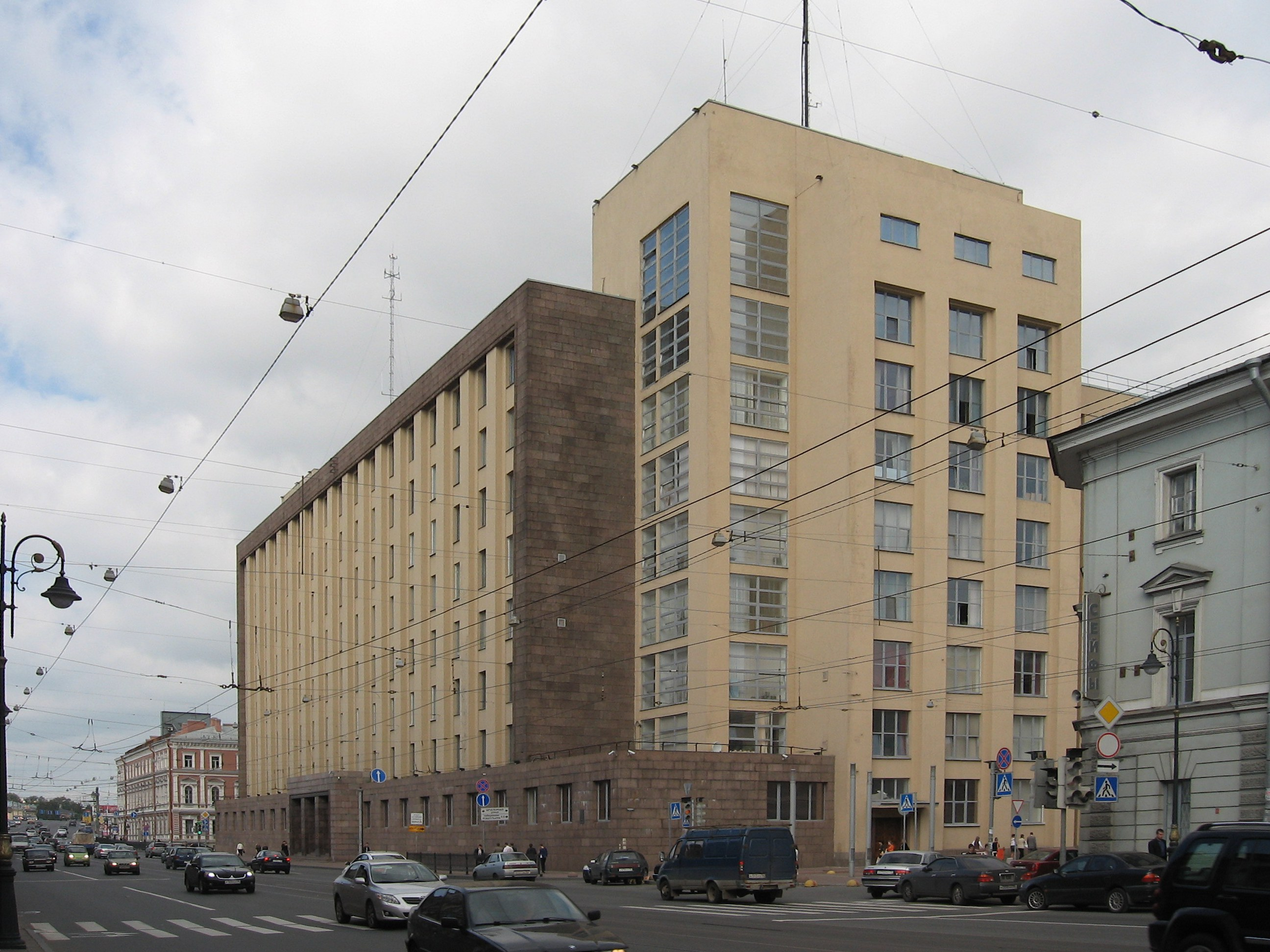
- View of Bolshoy Dom from Liteyny Avenue
- Interactive map of the Bolshoy Dom area

General information
- Type: Administrative facility
- Architectural style: Constructivist
- Location: Saint Petersburg, Russia, Liteyny Prospekt, 4
- Coordinates: 59°56′55″N 30°20′57″E
- Current tenants: Federal Security Service, Ministry of Internal Affairs
- Construction started: 1931
- Completed: 1932

Design and construction
- Architects: Alexander Gegello, Andrey Ol, Noi Trotsky

Bolshoy Dom (Russian: Большой дом, lit. the Big House) is an office building located at 4 Liteyny Avenue in Saint Petersburg, Russia. It is the headquarters of the local Saint Petersburg and Leningrad Oblast branches of the Federal Security Service of Russia (FSB) and Main Department of the Ministry of Internal Affairs.

The building is located in the Central District of Saint Petersburg at the beginning of Liteyny Prospekt, one block from the Neva River, at the site of Imperial Russian Old Armoury Building which burned down in 1917. It was originally constructed in 1931–32 for the Joint State Political Directorate (OGPU), the secret police of the Soviet Union at the time. The building was designed by Soviet architects Noi Trotsky, Alexander Gegello and Andrey Ol in the late Constructivist style. The Bolshoy Dom building is part of a larger complex which includes the detention facility on Shpalernaya Street, with both gaining notoriety as a prison during the Great Purge under Joseph Stalin. In July 1934, the building became local headquarters of the newly created People's Commissariat for Internal Affairs (NKVD), when the OGPU was reincorporated as the Main Directorate of State Security (GUGB) of the NKVD. Bolshoy Dom subsequently became the local headquarters for the more widely known Committee for State Security (KGB) when it replaced the NKVD, and remained under KGB usage until the collapse of the Soviet Union in 1991.

Bolshoy Dom became the subject of numerous urban legends in Soviet and Russian culture due to its association with the secret police, including all buildings of the FSB being nicknamed Bolshoy Dom. The common conspiracy theory about the building is that it contains a large amount of secret underground floors, leading to jokes about Bolshoy Dom being the tallest building in Saint Petersburg. There is also a legend that the building survived the Siege of Leningrad during World War II because Nazi Germany was aware that German prisoners of war were housed in the top floor, preventing it from being bombed.
