= Pyotr Bochek =

Soviet Army officer (1925–2018)

Pyotr Semyonovich Bochek
- Петро Семенович Бочек
- Born: 3 March 1925; Obrazhiivka, Ukraine
- Died: 9 February 2018 (aged 92); Lviv, Ukraine
- Military career
- Allegiance: Soviet Union
- Branch: Red Army
- Service years: 1943 – 1948
- Rank: Colonel
- Unit: 76th Guards Rifle Regiment
- Conflicts: World War II
- Awards: Hero of the Soviet Union

Pyotr Semyonovich Bochek, (Ukrainian: Петро Семенович Бочек; 3 March 1925 – 9 February 2018) was a junior lieutenant of the Soviet Army during World War II and a Hero of the Soviet Union.

He was born in the Obrazhiivka village, Ukrainian SSR. He was drafted in November 1943 and commenced active war duty in January 1944. He was awarded the title Hero of the Soviet Union (Gold Star Medal No. 5867) on March 24, 1945 for heroism during the crossing of the Vistula River.

He was also awarded the Order of Lenin (comes with the Hero title), Order of the Great Patriotic War, Order of Glory, and several medals.
