= Noi Trotsky =

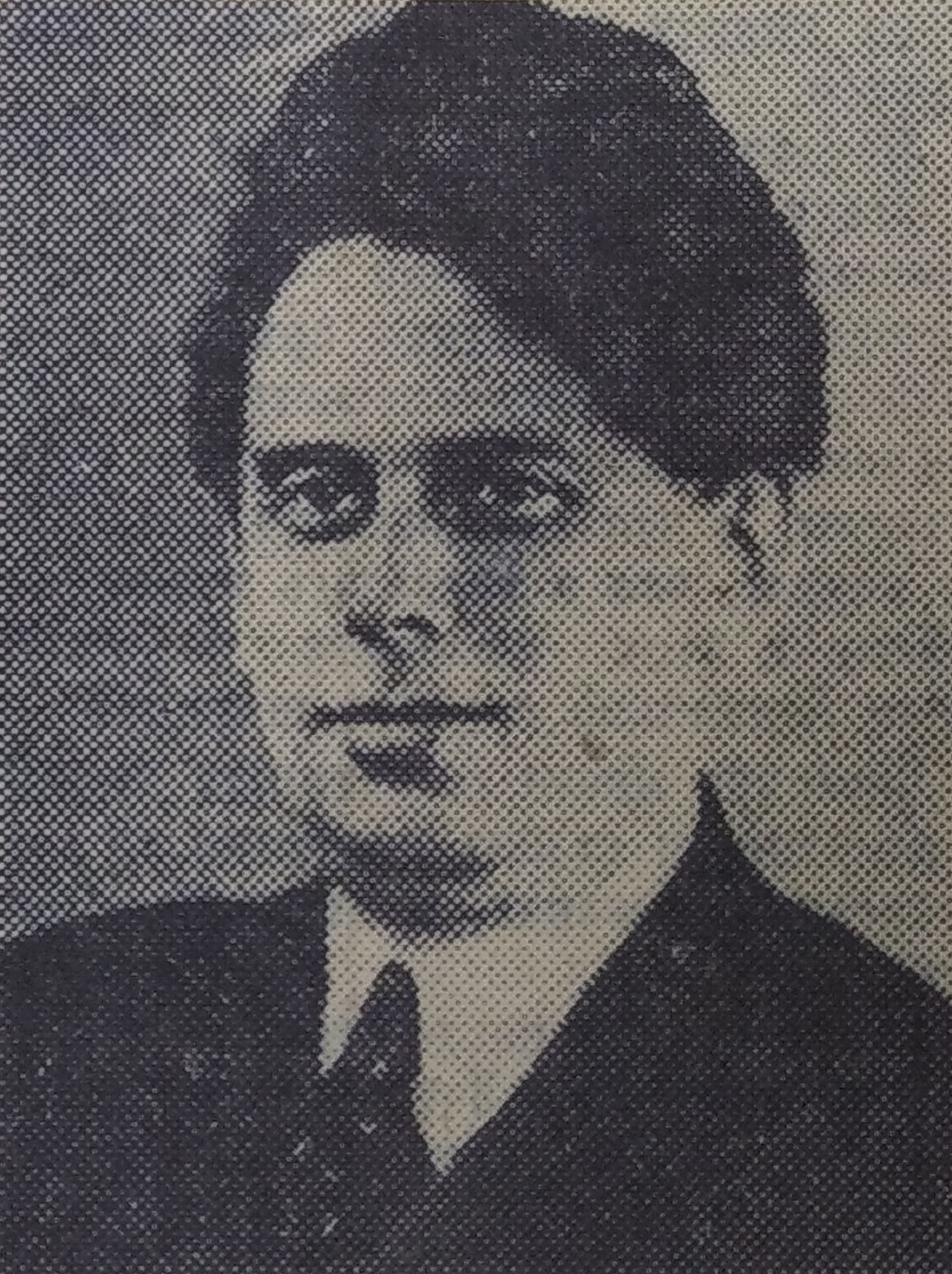
- Born: 27 March 1895; St. Petersburg, Russian Empire
- Died: 19 November 1940 (aged 45); Leningrad, USSR
- Occupation: Architect
- Buildings: Kirov Town Hall; House of Soviets (Leningrad)

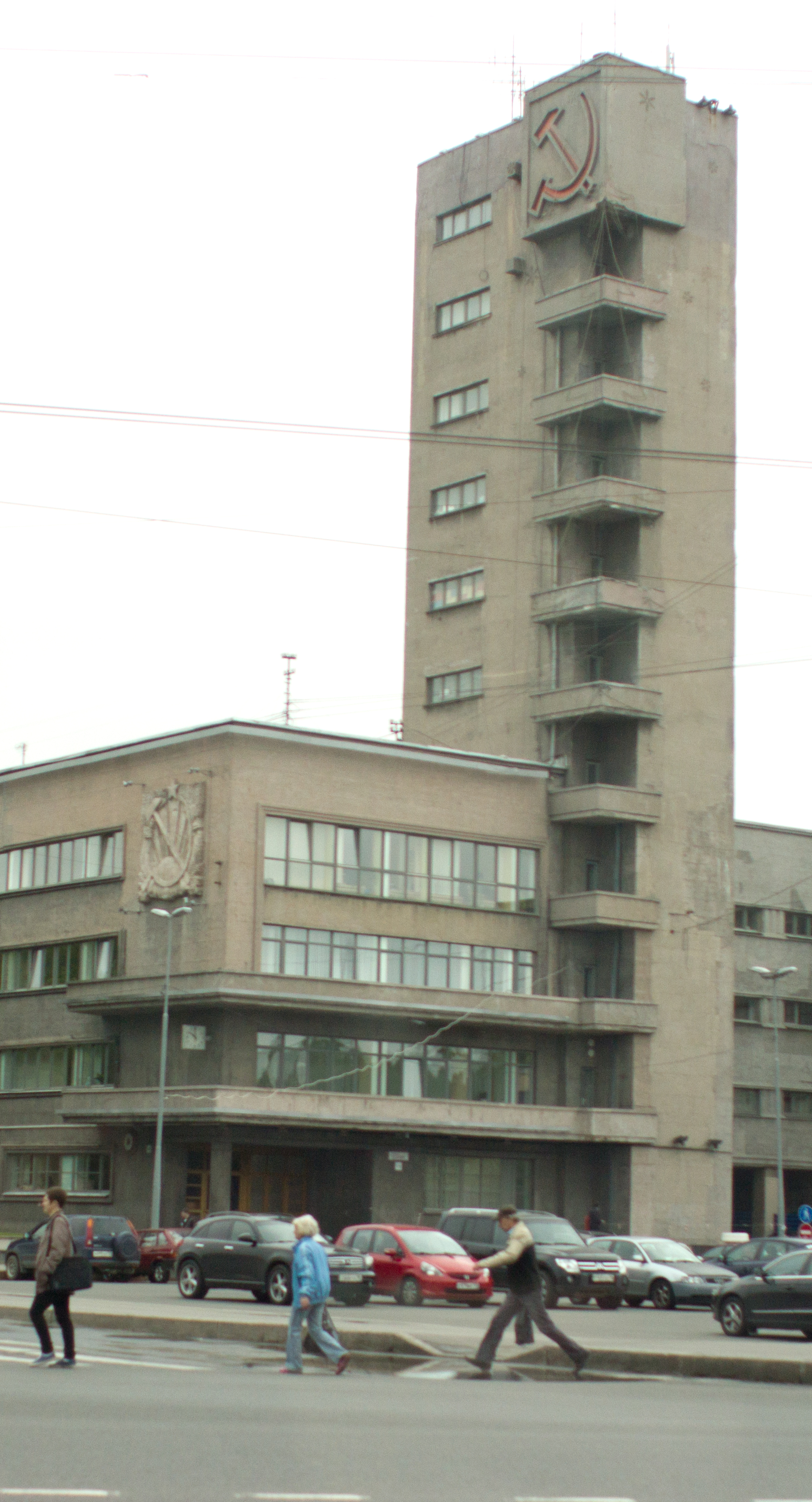
1930s Kirov District Administration building, in St. Petersburg, Russia.

Noi (Noah) Abramovich Trotsky (Russian: Ной Абра́мович Тро́цкий; March 15, 1895 – November 19, 1940) was a Soviet architect.

== Biography ==
Born in St. Petersburg to a family of a typesetter, Trotsky took art classes from the renowned painter Nicholas Roerich, graduated from the Academy of Arts in 1920 (then named "Petrograd Free Art Workshops") and 2nd Polytechnic in 1921. He also apprenticed with "Red Doric" architect Ivan Fomin around the same time.

Often cited for his turn from Constructivism towards Stalinist neo-Classicism in the 1930s, Trotsky's training under Fomin indicates a long familiarity with classical forms. The high point of his Constructivist work is probably the Kirov District Administration building of 1938.

Trotsky's best-known project is the House of Soviets in Saint Petersburg. At the year of its completion, the building was the largest office building in Saint Petersburg (then Leningrad). In March 1936, the Leningrad Soviet decided to relocate all the city's administration to a new site at the southern end of International Avenue. In open tender, Trotsky's project was selected over ten others. It was completed after Trotsky death, with co-authors Modest Shepilevsky and Yakov Lukin, and it features an impressive 11-meter-high frieze by Soviet sculptor Nikolai Tomsky.

Trotsky taught at the Academy of Arts' successor, VKhuTeIn (ru:ВХУТЕИН, ru:Высший художественно-технический институт, Higher Institute of Arts and Design, later renamed into институт живописи, скульптуры и архитектуры (им. Репина), (Repin) Institute of Painting, Sculpture and Architecture), from 1929, was Professor there from 1939, and taught at the Saint-Petersburg State University of Architecture and Civil Engineering. He died in 1940 and is buried at the Volkovo Cemetery in Saint Petersburg.

== Work ==
(in St. Petersburg unless otherwise noted)

- 2nd Power Station in Novgorodskaya Street, 1923
- Kirov Palace of Culture on Vasilievsky Island, 1931–1937
- Kirov District Administration, with the monument to Sergey Kirov by sculptor Nikolai Tomsky, 1938
- Kirov Meat Plant, 1930–1935
- Bolshoy Dom, prison of the internal security services, Liteyny Prospekt, with co-designers Alexander Gegello and Andrey Ol, 1931–1935
- House of the Soviets, 1936–1941
- Opera Theater in Samara, with Nikolai Katsenelenbogen, 1936–1938

== Sources ==
- biography (in Russian)
- Berkovich, Gary. Reclaiming a History. Jewish Architects in Imperial Russia and the USSR. Volume 2. Soviet Avant-garde: 1917–1933. Weimar und Rostock: Grunberg Verlag. 2021. P. 92. ISBN 978-3-933713-63-6
