= Obrazhiivka =

Obrazhiivka Ображіївка
- City
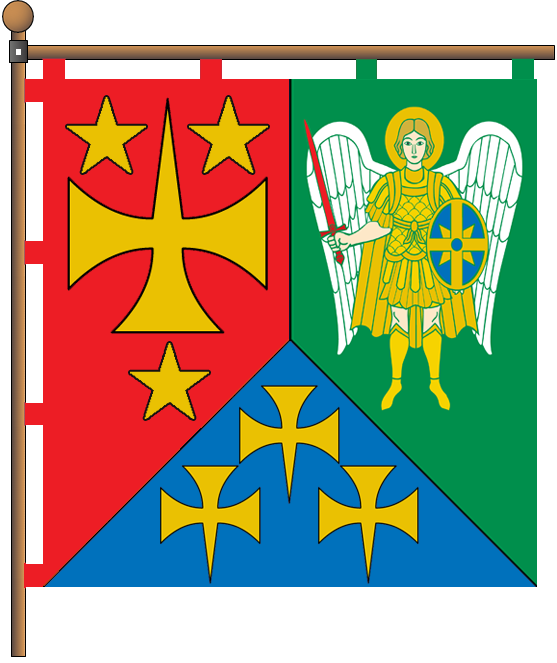
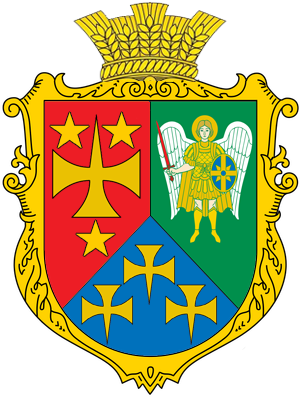
- Flag Seal

- Location within Sumy Oblast Location within Ukraine
- Coordinates: 51°54′37″N 33°24′45″E
- Country: Ukraine
- Oblast: Sumy
- Raion: Shostka Raion
- Founded: 1669

Population (2021)
  - Total: 1,419
- Time zone: UTC+2 (EET)
  - Summer (DST): UTC+3 (EEST)
- Postal code: 41120
- Area code: +380 5449

Obrazhiivka (Ukrainian: Ображіївка; Russian: Ображиевка, romanized: Obrazhiyevka) is a village in Shostka urban hromada, Shostka Raion, Sumy Oblast, Ukraine.

== Notable residents ==
- Ivan Kozhedub, Hero of the Soviet Union
- Pyotr Bochek, Hero of the Soviet Union
