= Spandau Citadel =

Well-preserved Renaissance military structure in Berlin

Coordinates: 52°32′29″N 13°12′44″E

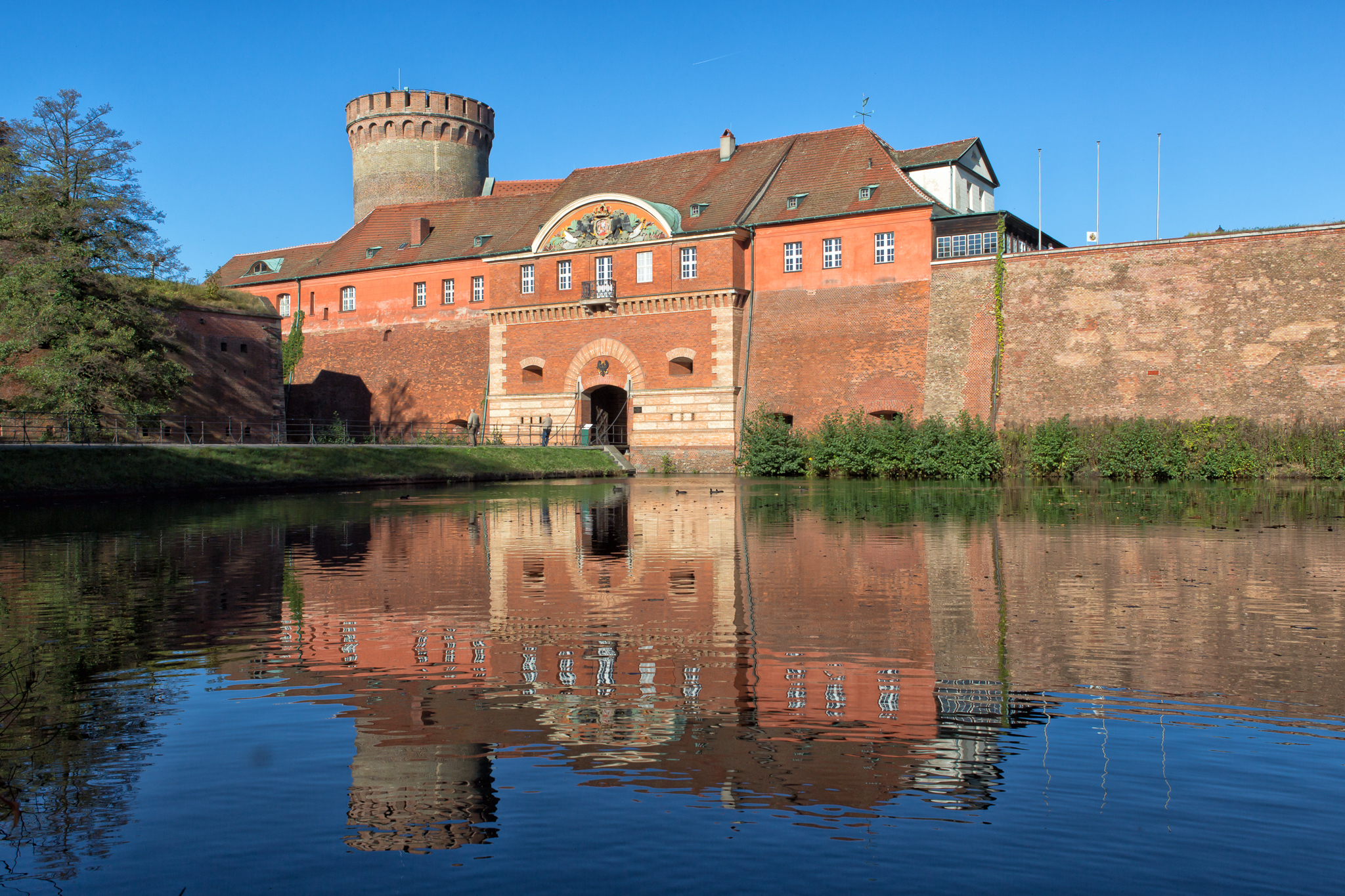
Spandau Citadel

Spandau Citadel, Berlin

The Spandau Citadel (German: Zitadelle Spandau) is a fortress in Berlin, Germany, one of the best-preserved Renaissance military structures of Europe. Built from 1559–94 atop a medieval fort on an island near the meeting of the Havel and the Spree, it was designed to protect the town of Spandau, which is now part of Berlin. In recent years it has been used as a museum and has become a popular tourist spot. Furthermore, the inner courtyard of the Citadel has served as an open air concert venue in the summertime since 2005.

== History ==
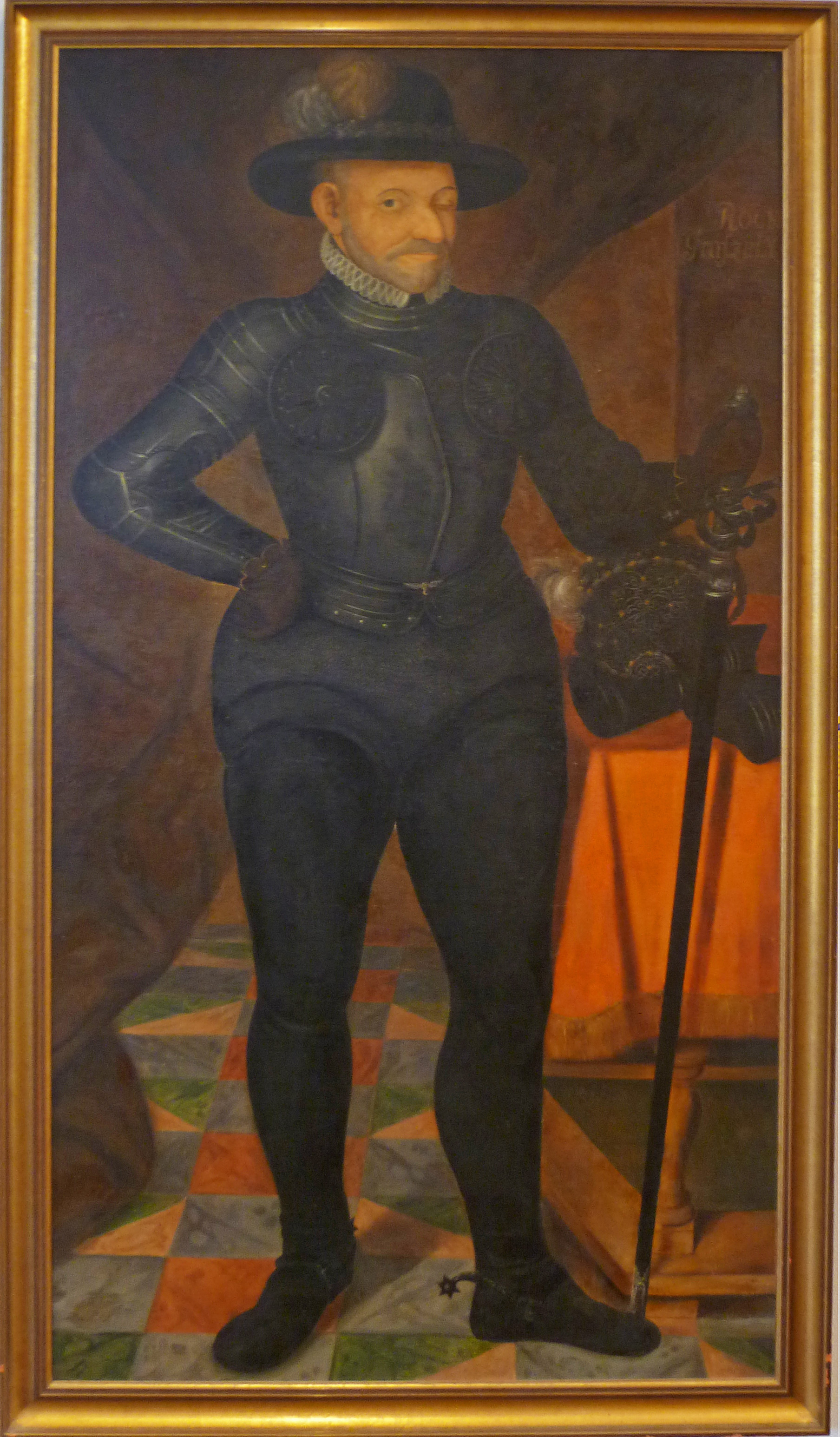
Count Rochus zu Lynar

In 1157, Albert the Bear built a frontier fortress at this site, and by the middle of the 15th century, the site was the Margrave of Brandenburg seat of government. By 1560, Joachim II Hector, Elector of Brandenburg engaged Christoph Römer to build an Italian style fortress, incorporating the older castle, Palas, and Julius Tower. In 1562, Römer was replaced by Francesco Chiaramella de Gandino. In 1578 Rochus Graf zu Lynar took over.

In 1580, the first troops were assigned to Spandau Citadel, although its construction was not complete until 1594. Swedish troops were the first to besiege the citadel in 1675. In 1806 the citadel's garrison surrendered to the French army under Napoleon without firing a shot during the Fall of Berlin. It was retaken by Prussian and Russian forces in 1813, but the ramparts were heavily damaged during the battle and required extensive restoration. The citadel was also used as a prison for Prussian state prisoners, including German nationalist Friedrich Ludwig Jahn.

In 1935, the Army's Gas Protection Laboratory was installed. The site employed about 300 scientist and technicians working on chemical weapons (including synthesis, animal and human testing, munitions development, and development of manufacturing processes). Much of the work developing nerve gas was done here.

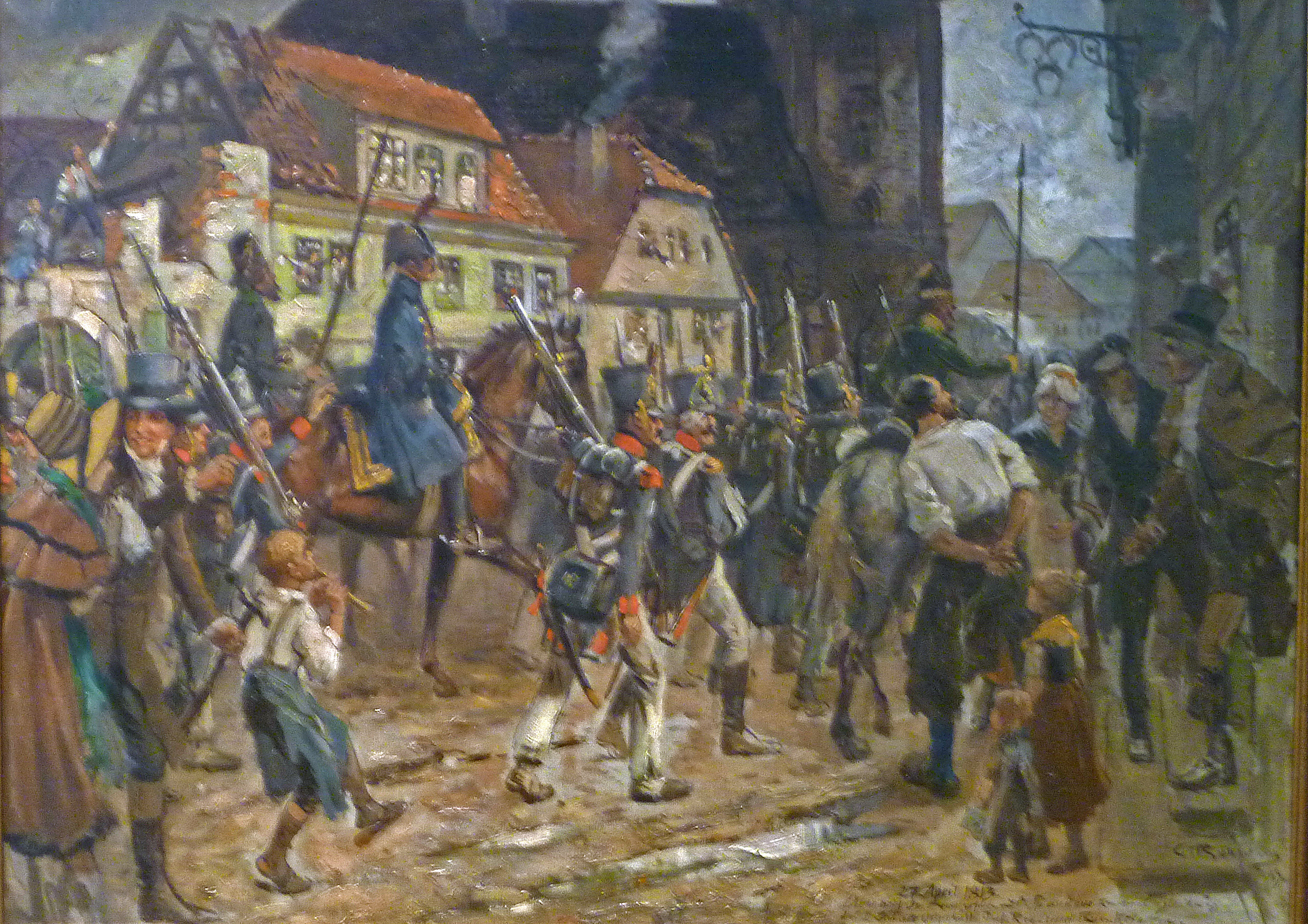
French troops leaving Spandau on 27 April 1813; oil painting (1913) by Carl Röhling

Close to the end of the Second World War, during the battle in Berlin, the citadel became a part of the city's defences. Although several hundred years old, the Citadel's tracé à l'italienne design made the structure difficult to storm. So instead of bombarding and storming the Citadel, the Soviets invested it and set about negotiating a surrender. After negotiations, the citadel's commander surrendered to the Lieutenant-General Perkhorovitch's 47th Army just after 15:00 on 1 May 1945, saving many lives and leaving the Renaissance bastion fort intact.

After the Second World War, the Spandau Citadel was first occupied by Soviet troops. After the division of Berlin by the Allied powers, Spandau and its Citadel were part of the British sector. Despite its history as a prison, the Citadel was not used to hold National Socialist war criminals. Rather, they were housed at Spandau prison in the same Berlin borough.

The Citadel now houses a museum, the Zitadelle; among the exhibitions is a collection of sculptures that have been removed from public display in Berlin over previous centuries, including statues of Friedrich Wilhelm III and Queen Luise, Nazi art, and the head of a 19-metre statue of Lenin.

== Structure ==
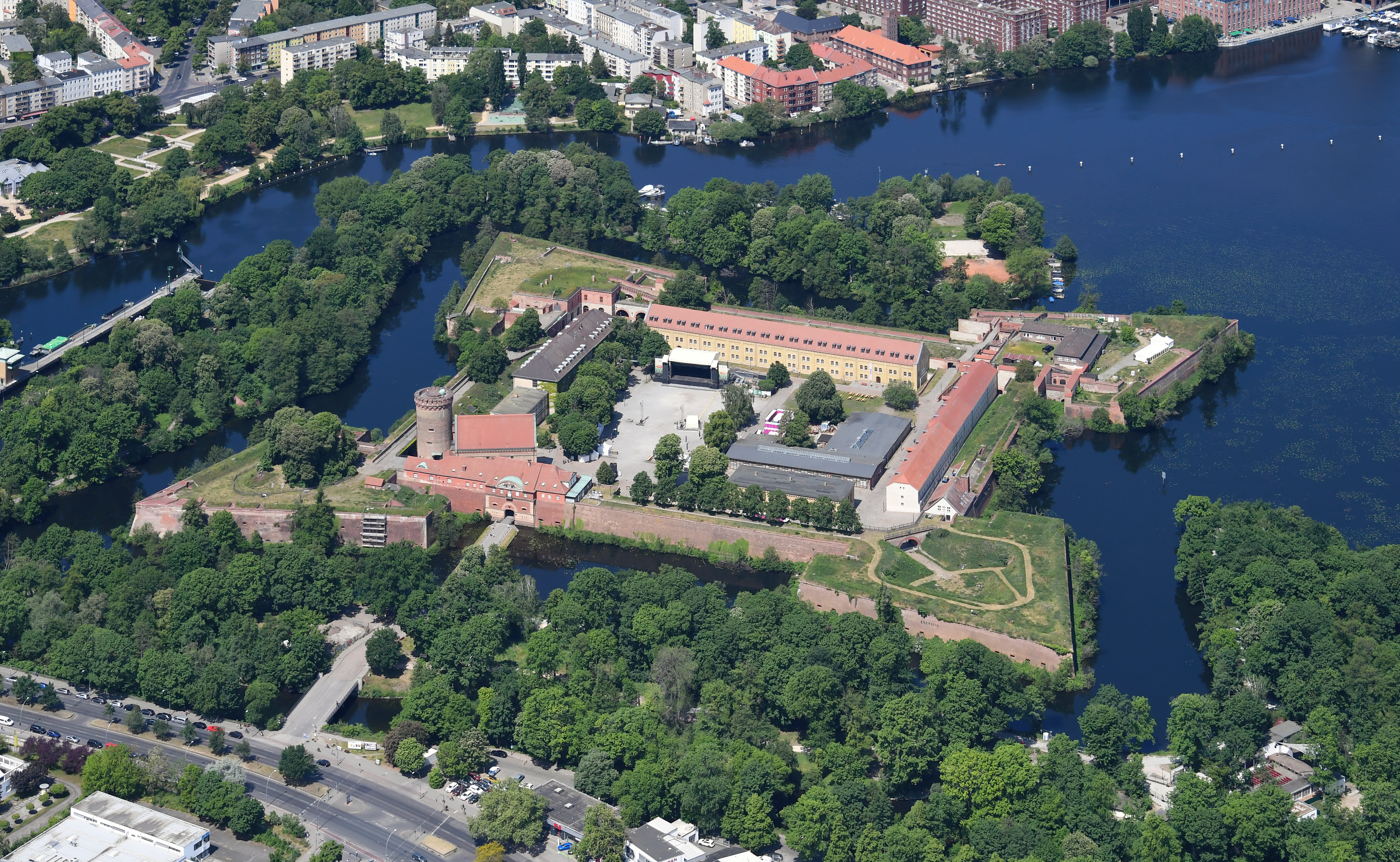
Aerial view of the Spandau Citadel

The citadel is composed of different buildings all related to defence or representative housing. The gate house with a draw bridge used to hinder attackers from entering the citadel. The Gothic hall building palace was used as residential building. Gravestones dating back to 1244 bear witness to Jewish life as an important trade town, and the function of the citadel as a refuge. Julius tower is Spandau's most famous sight. Originally built as a keep or watchtower, it was also used as a residence tower. Its castellated top was designed by Karl Friedrich Schinkel in 1838 and is an example of Romantic architecture. After the Franco-Prussian War 1870/71, part of the war reparations paid by France, 120 million marks in gold coin, was stored at Julius tower until its restitution to France in 1919.

The word Juliusturm has since been used in Germany for governmental budget surpluses.

From 1950 to 1986, the citadel housed vocational school Otto Bartning. Subsequently, more and more buildings were redesigned for museums and exhibition. Today, Spandau Citadel is famous for its open-air concerts during the Citadel Music Festival.

Scenes from the 1985 action film Gotcha! were filmed at and around Spandau Citadel.

== See also ==
- Spandau Prison
- Haselhorst
