= History of Metz =

Metz, the capital and the prefecture of the Moselle department in France, has a recorded history dating back over 2,000 years. During this time, it was successively a Celtic oppidum, an important Gallo-Roman city, the Merovingian capital of the Austrasia kingdom, the birthplace of the Carolingian dynasty, a cradle of Gregorian chant, and one of the oldest republics of the common era in Europe. As an important city in the heart of Europe and the crossroads of different cultures, Metz has variously experienced an integration into the Roman Empire, the period of christianization, the barbarian depredations, religious wars, the French Revolution, the Industrial Revolution, an annexation into the German Empire, and World War II.

== Ancient history ==
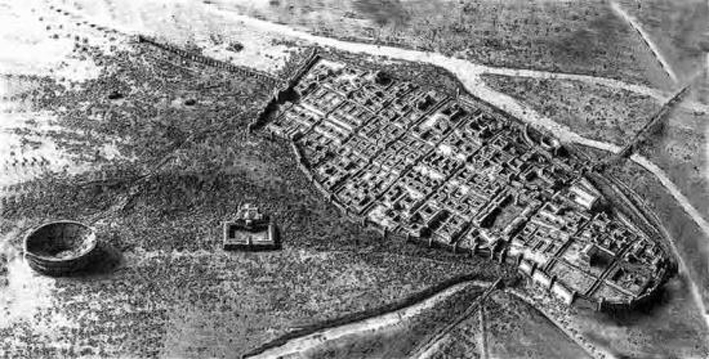
City scape of Divodurum Mediomatricum, ancestor of present-day Metz, ca. 2nd century AD.

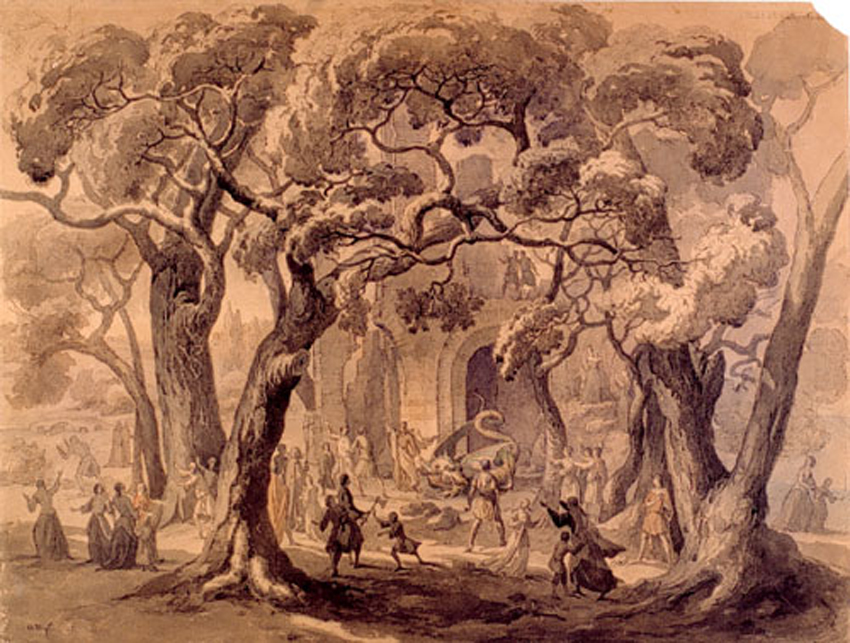
Representation of Saint Clement fighting the Graoully dragon in the Roman amphitheater of Metz.

The Celtic Mediomatrici tribe was ruler of the city from 450 BC until the Roman conquest, making the town its principal oppidum. The city became an important centre of trading for metal and terracotta. With the conquest of Gaul by Julius Caesar in 52 BC, Metz came under Roman rule and was integrated into the Roman Empire.

=== Roman Empire ===
As a well-fortified town, Divodurum, at the junction of several military roads, Metz became one of the principal towns of Gaul, more populous than Lutetia (ancestor of present-day Paris), and rich thanks to its wine exports. The city had one of the largest amphitheatres in Gaul, and an aqueduct of 23 km (14.29 mi) and 118 arches, extending from Gorze to Metz, was constructed in the 2nd century AD to supply the thermae with water. Remains of the aqueduct may still be seen today, notably in the cities of Jouy-aux-Arches and Ars-sur-Moselle, and the vestiges of the thermae can be visited in the basement of the Golden Courtyard museum.

The first barbarian depredations into the city by the Alemanni and Franks started during the 3rd century AD. The city was sacked by the Huns of Attila in 451. One of the last Roman strongholds to surrender to the Germanic tribes, Metz passed into the hands of the Franks about the end of the 5th century.

==== Massacre of 69 AD ====
The troops of Vitellius while marching on their way to Italy stopped at Divodurum and inexplicably massacred almost 4000 innocent civilians.

==== Christianization ====
According to tradition, Saint Clement of Metz is believed to be the first bishop of Metz. He was sent by Saint Peter to Metz during the 1st century, with two disciples: Celestius and Felix, who are listed as his successors. Nonetheless, the first fully authenticated bishop is Sperus or Hesperus, who was bishop in 535.

Clement of Metz, like many other saints, is the hero of a legend in which he is the vanquisher of a local dragon, the Graoully. The legend states that the Graoully, along with countless other snakes, inhabited the local Roman amphitheater. The snakes' breath had so poisoned the area that the inhabitants of the town were effectively trapped. After converting the local inhabitants to Christianity after they agreed to do so in return for ridding them of the dragon, Clement went into the amphitheater and quickly made the sign of the cross after the snakes attacked him. They immediately were tamed by this. Clement led the Graoully to the edge of the Seille, and ordered him to disappear into a place where there were no men or beasts. Authors tend to present such legend as a symbol of Christianity's victory over paganism, represented by a harmful dragon.

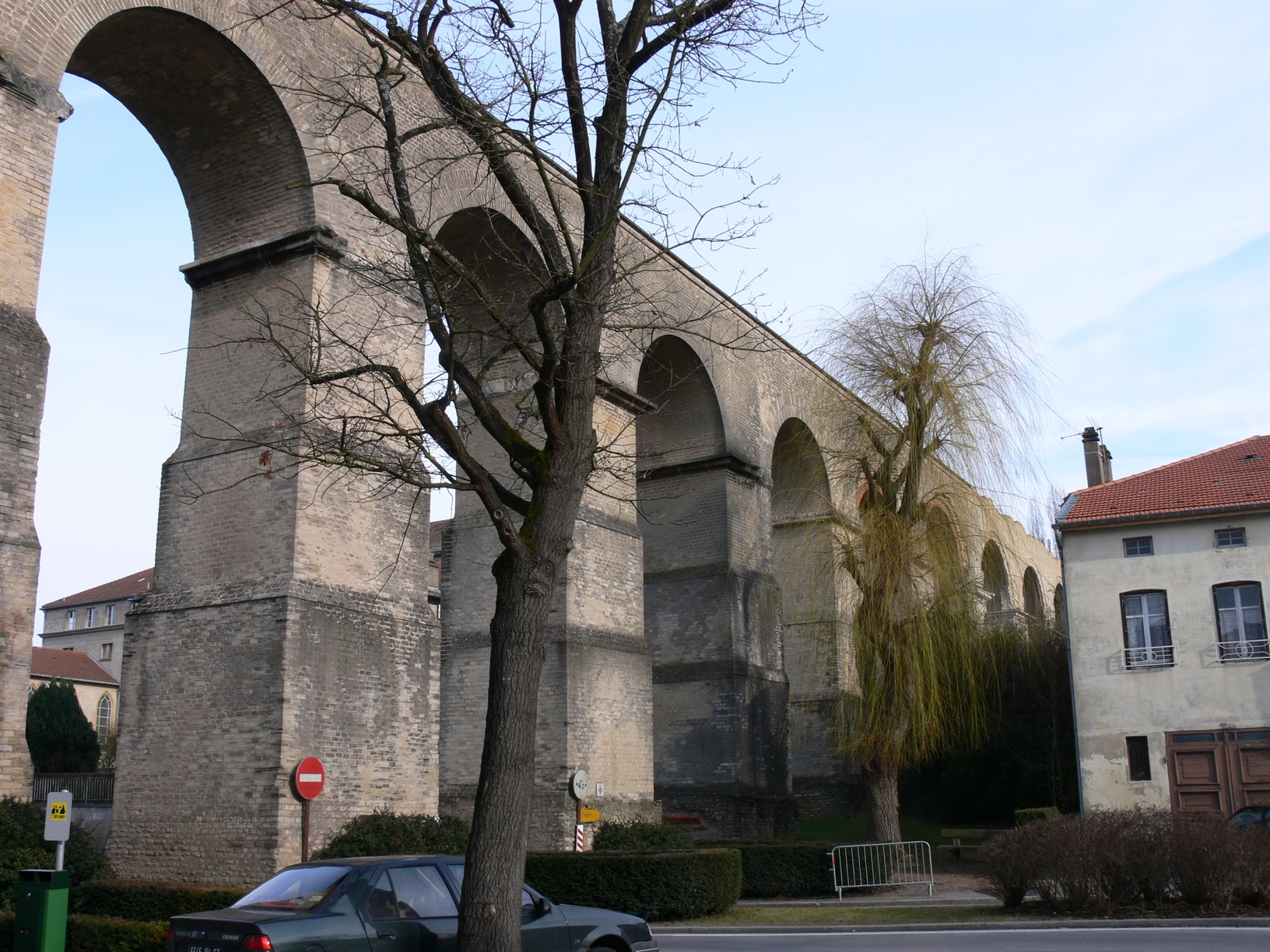
Remains of the Roman aqueduct from Gorze to Metz.

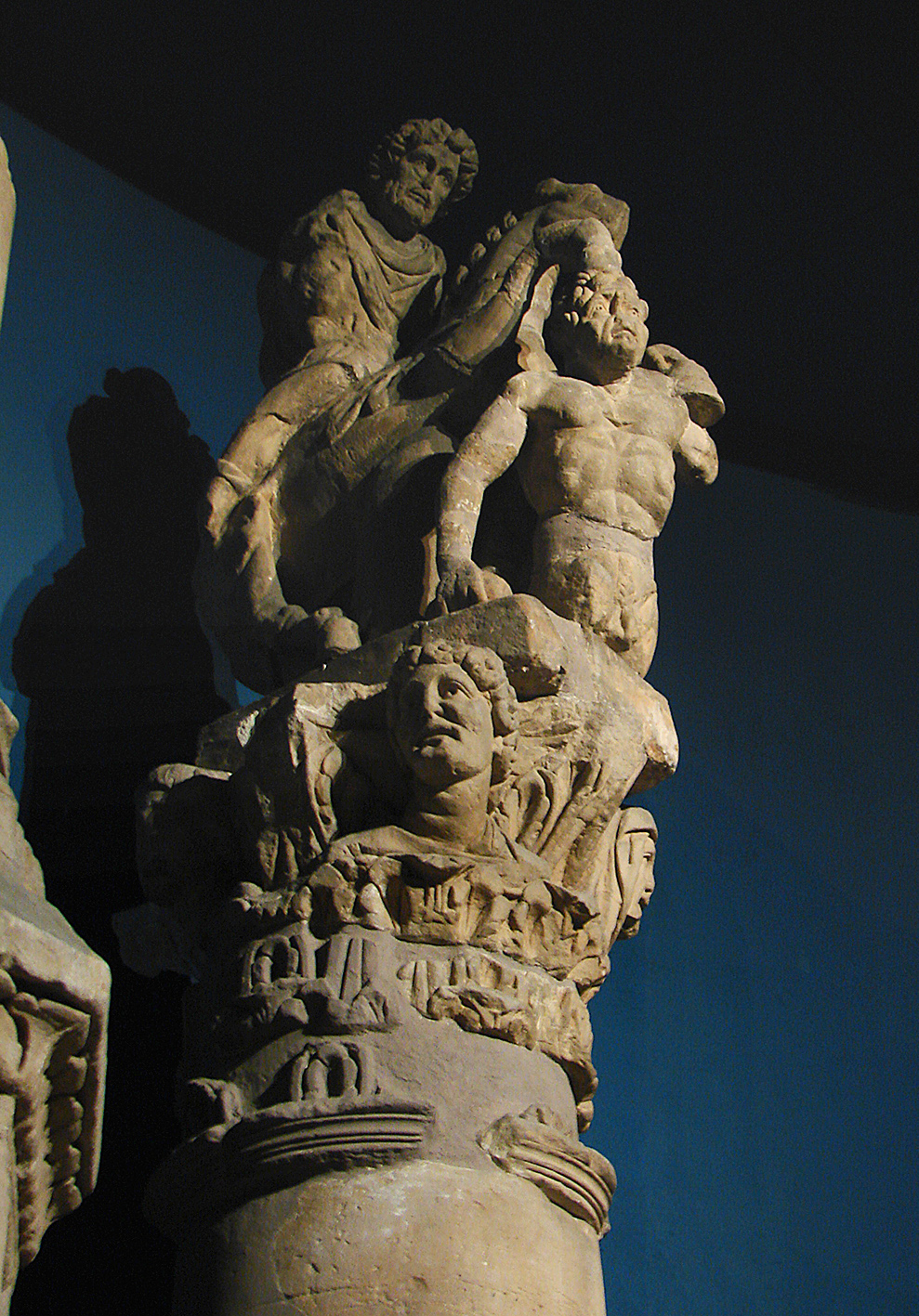
Jupiter Column of Merten, Metz museum.

== A Merovingian capital ==
=== The capital of the kingdom of Austrasia ===
From the time of King Sigibert I, Metz was frequently the residence of the Merovingian kings of Kingdom of Austrasia. When the Carolingians acceded to the Frankish throne, the town retained their goodwill as it had long been a base of their family and their primal ancestors; Saint Arnuff and Chlodulf had been bishops of Metz. The Emperor Charlemagne considered making Metz his imperial capital, but eventually chose Aachen. His sons, King Louis the Pious and Bishop Drogo of Metz, were buried in the Basilica of Saint-Pierre-aux-Nonnains in 840 and 855 respectively.

=== The capital of the kingdom of Lotharingia ===
Subsequent to the Treaty of Verdun in 843, Metz became the capital of the Kingdom of Lotharingia ruled by Emperor Lothair I. After the death of his son, King Lothair II, Lotharingia and its capital was disputed between the kingdoms of East Francia and West Francia. In 869, Charles the Bald was crowned king of Lotharingia in Metz.

In 910, Metz became part of East Francia and subsequently of the Holy Roman Empire, granting semi-independent status. In 959, Metz was the capital of Upper Lotharingia, gradually known as Lorraine, until the 11th century. During this period, the Bishops of Metz increased their political influence. The Prince-Bishops gained their independence from the Dukes of Lorraine, making Metz their capital.

In 1096, Metz was one of the scenes of the massacres of Jews occurring during the First Crusade. A group of crusaders entered Metz and forced the sizeable Jewish community of the city to convert to Catholicism, killing 22 people who refused baptism.

==== Carolingian Renaissance ====
Metz was an important cultural centre during the Carolingian Renaissance. Gregorian chant was created in Metz during the 8th century as a fusion of Gallican and ancient Roman repertory, and remains the oldest form of music still use in Western Europe. Then called Messin Chant, the bishops of Metz, notably Saint-Chrodegang, promoted its use for the Roman liturgy in Gallic lands in the favorable atmosphere of Carolingian monarchs. The Messin chant made two major contributions to the body of chant: it fitted the chant into the ancient Greek octoechos system, and invented an innovative musical notation, using neumes to show the shape of a remembered melody. Also, Metz was an important centre of illumination of Carolingian manuscripts, producing some monuments of Carolingian book illumination such as the Drogo Sacramentary.

Map of the Merovingian Austrasia kingdom (darkest green), Metz was its capital from 511 to 751.

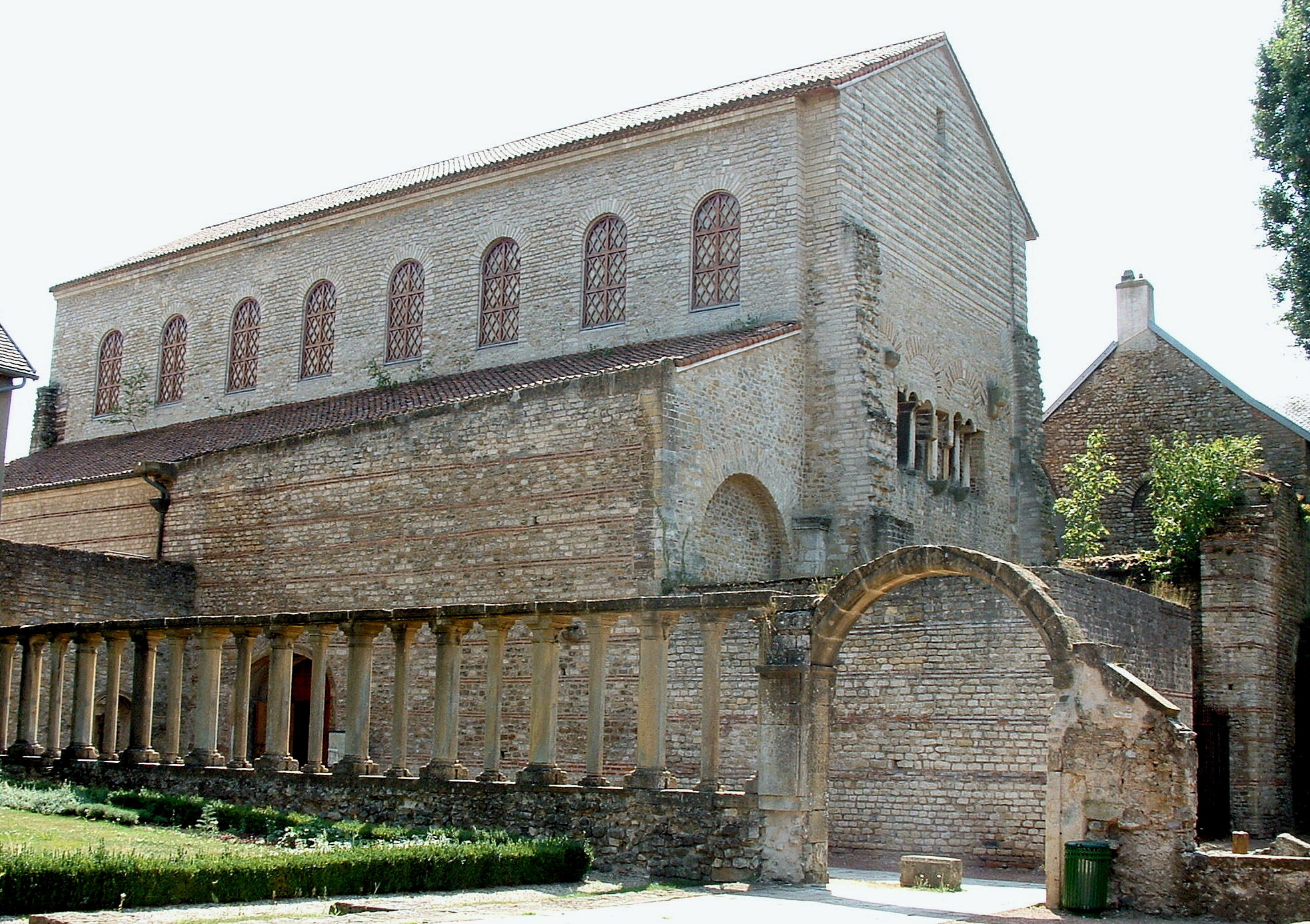
The basilica and former monastic church of Saint-Pierre-aux-Nonnains has been the cradle of the Gregorian chant.

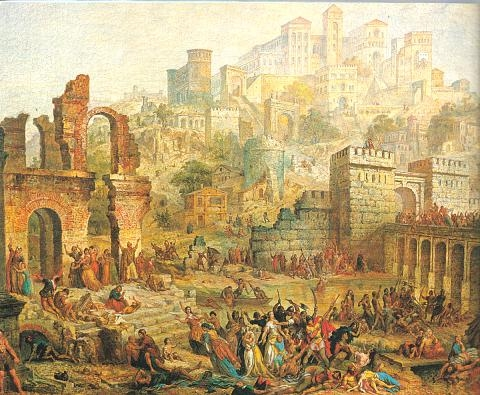
Depiction of the pogroms of 1096 in Metz.

== A Free Imperial City ==
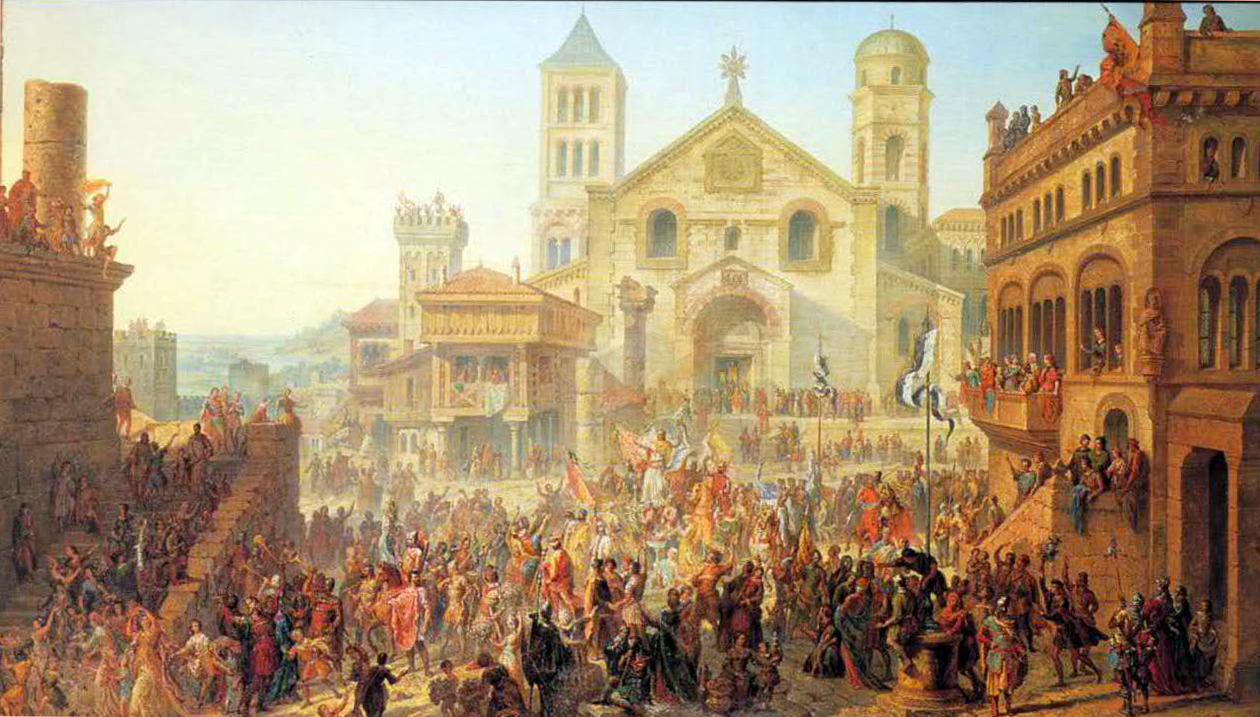
Beginning of the Republic of Metz. Election of the first Head-Alderman.

In 1189, Metz rose to the status of Free Imperial City, which sharply limited the influence of the bishops on the city. While the bishops left the city for Vic-sur-Seille, the burgesses organized to establish a republic.

=== The Messin Republic ===
Imperial Diet in Metz during which the Golden Bull of 1356 was issued.

The Republic of Metz was organized around three legislatures: the Head-Alderman representing the city, a comity of 13 aldermen acting as Lay community counsellors, and a House of Burgesses giving its opinion. Ultimately, the institutions changed to become a free oligarchic republic giving the command of the city to 21 aldermen, the Head-Alderman being elected. The Republic of Metz ruled until the 15th century, a prosperous period when it was renowned as "Metz the Rich". Metz was then a major banking centre, an occupation first controlled by Jews and then by the Lombards. The present-day Saint-Louis square used to be a site for money changers and trade fairs under its vaulted gallery and arches.

The Republic of Metz often had to fight for its freedom: in 1324, against the Dukes of Luxembourg and Lorraine in the War of Metz that saw an early use of cannons, as well as against Archbishop-Elector Baldwin von Luxemburg of Trier; in 1363 and 1365, against the English brigands under the command of Arnaud de Cervole; in 1444, against Duke René of Anjou and King Charles VII of France; and in 1473, against Duke Nicholas I of Lorraine. As a result of its continuing independence, Metz came to be called "The Maid" and "The Unviolated".

Emperor Charles IV in 1354 and 1356 held diets in Metz, where the Golden Bull decree of 1356 was promulgated, fixing important constitutional aspects of the Holy Roman Empire. Believing that the city occupied an almost independent position between the Kingdom of France and the Holy Roman Empire, the rulers of Metz wanted to evade the obligation of imperial taxes and attendance at the Imperial Diets. The Free Imperial City became estranged from the Imperial States, a rift exacerbated by the religious and political troubles of the Schmalkaldic War.

In 1546, French Renaissance writer François Rabelais came to Metz after being condemned for heresy by the University of Paris. During his time there he wrote his fourth book, in which he described a procession in the city with the effigy of the Graoully.

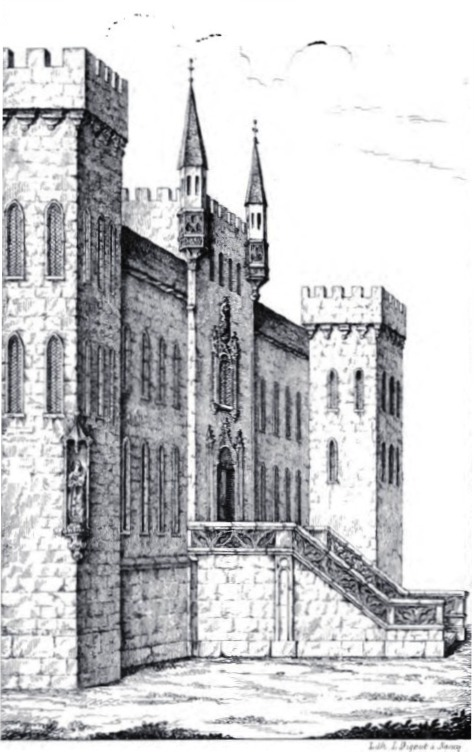
Engraving of the Palace of the Thirteens around 1610. The edifice was the seat of the Metz republic parliament.

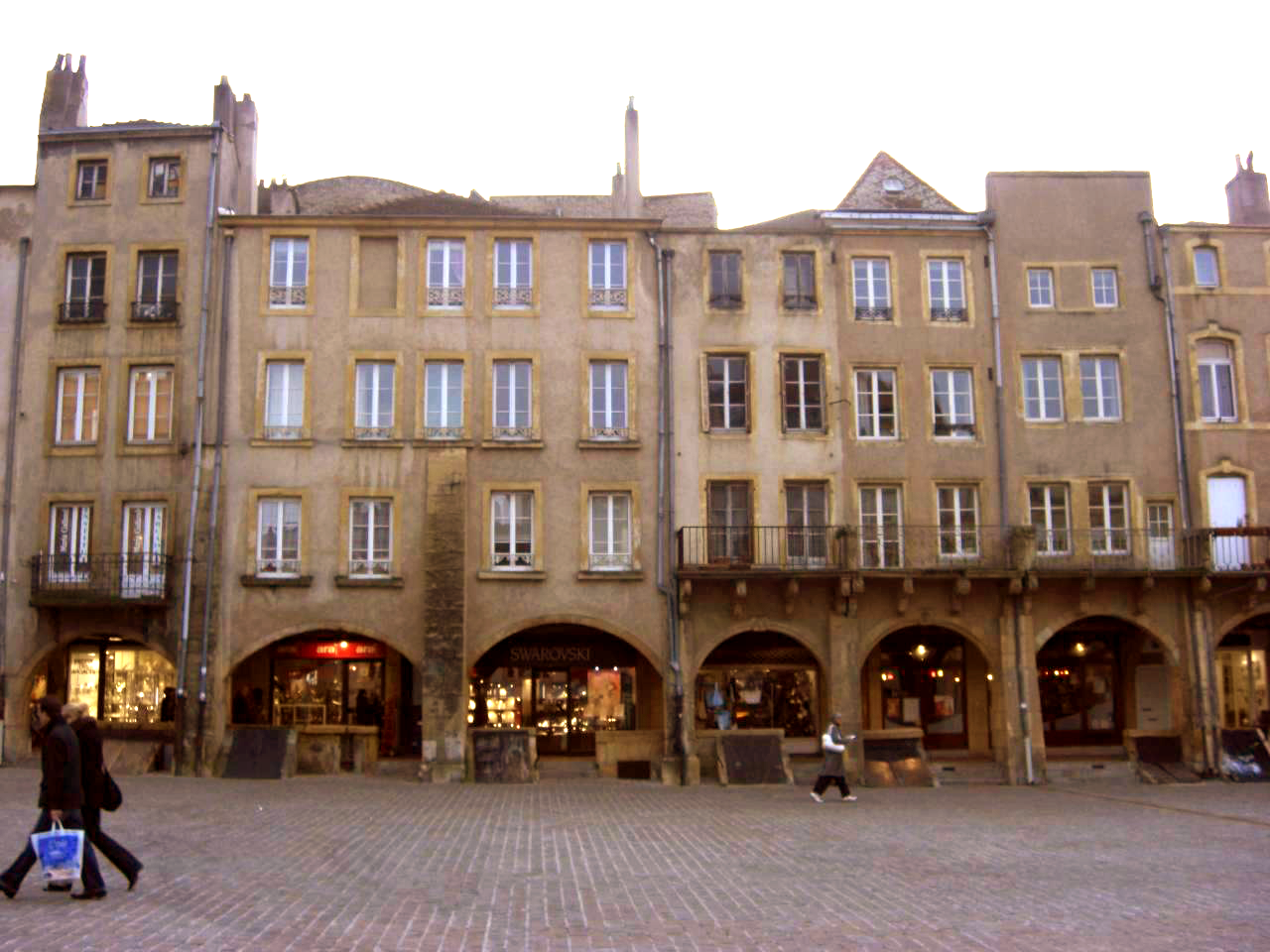
The Saint-Louis square with its vaulted gallery and arches was the site for money changers and the Lombards.

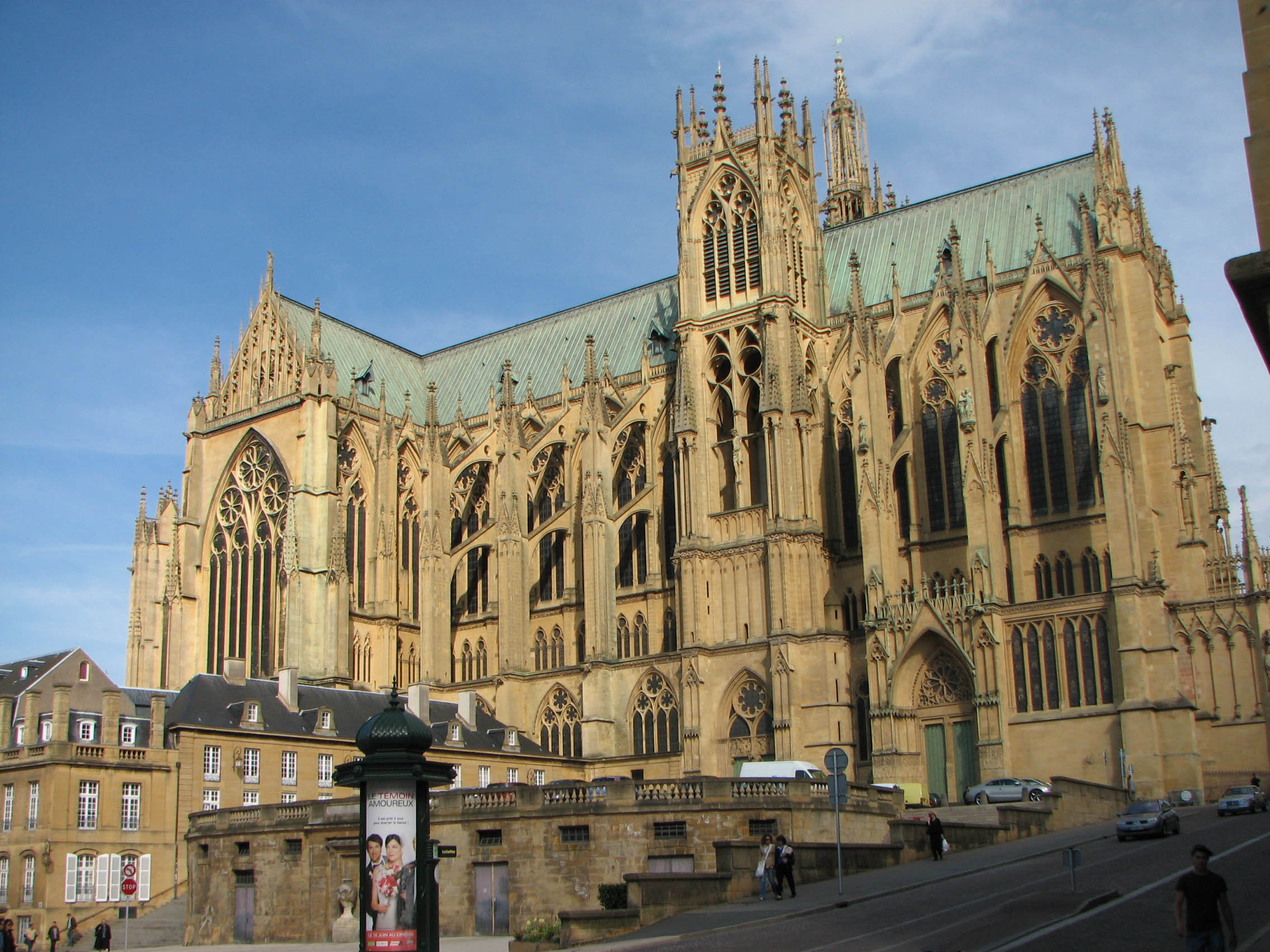
The construction of the Gothic Saint-Stephen Cathedral started in 1220. It is the cathedral of the Catholic Diocese of Metz and the seat of the Bishop of Metz.

== Integration into the kingdom of France ==
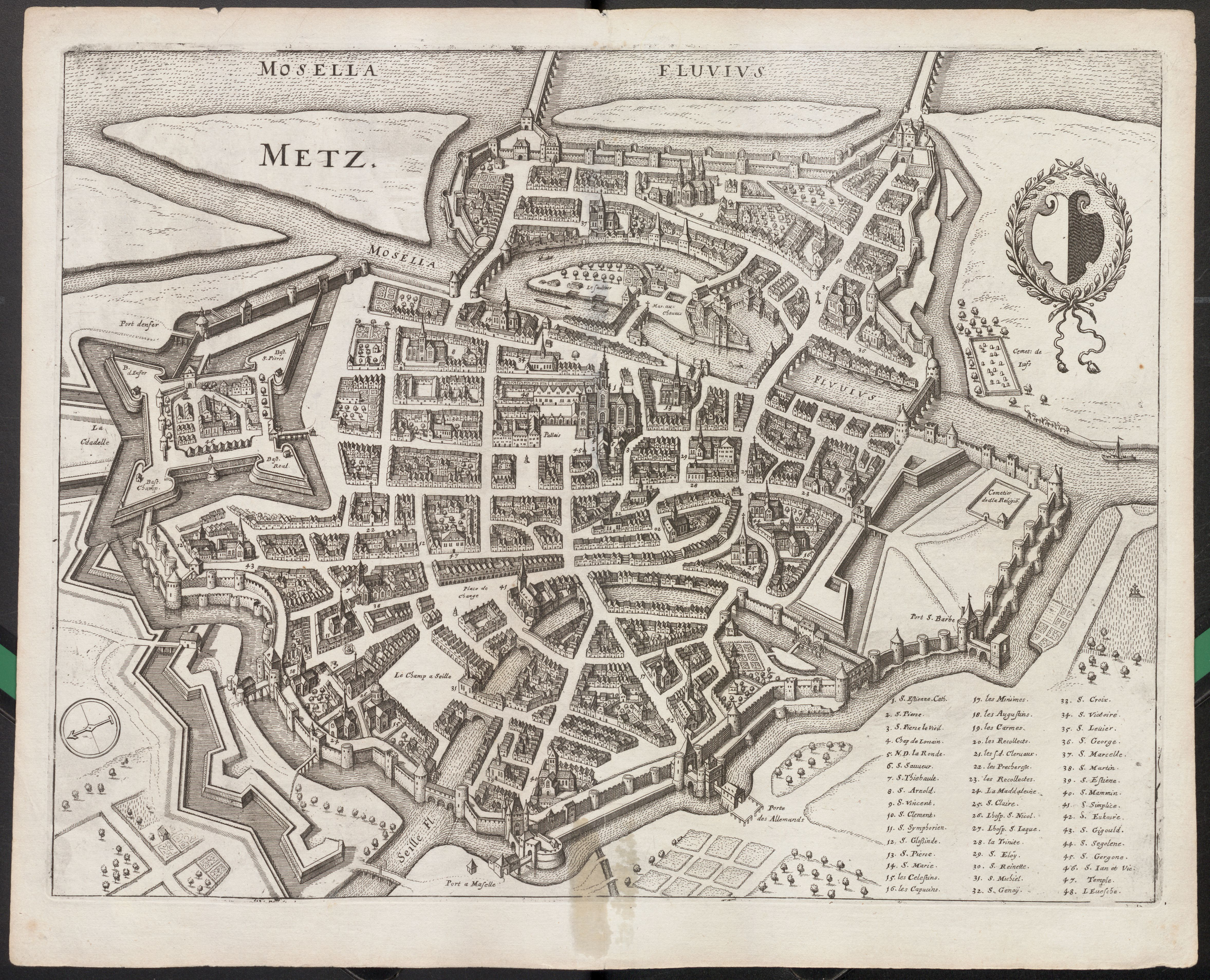
Metz in the 17th century

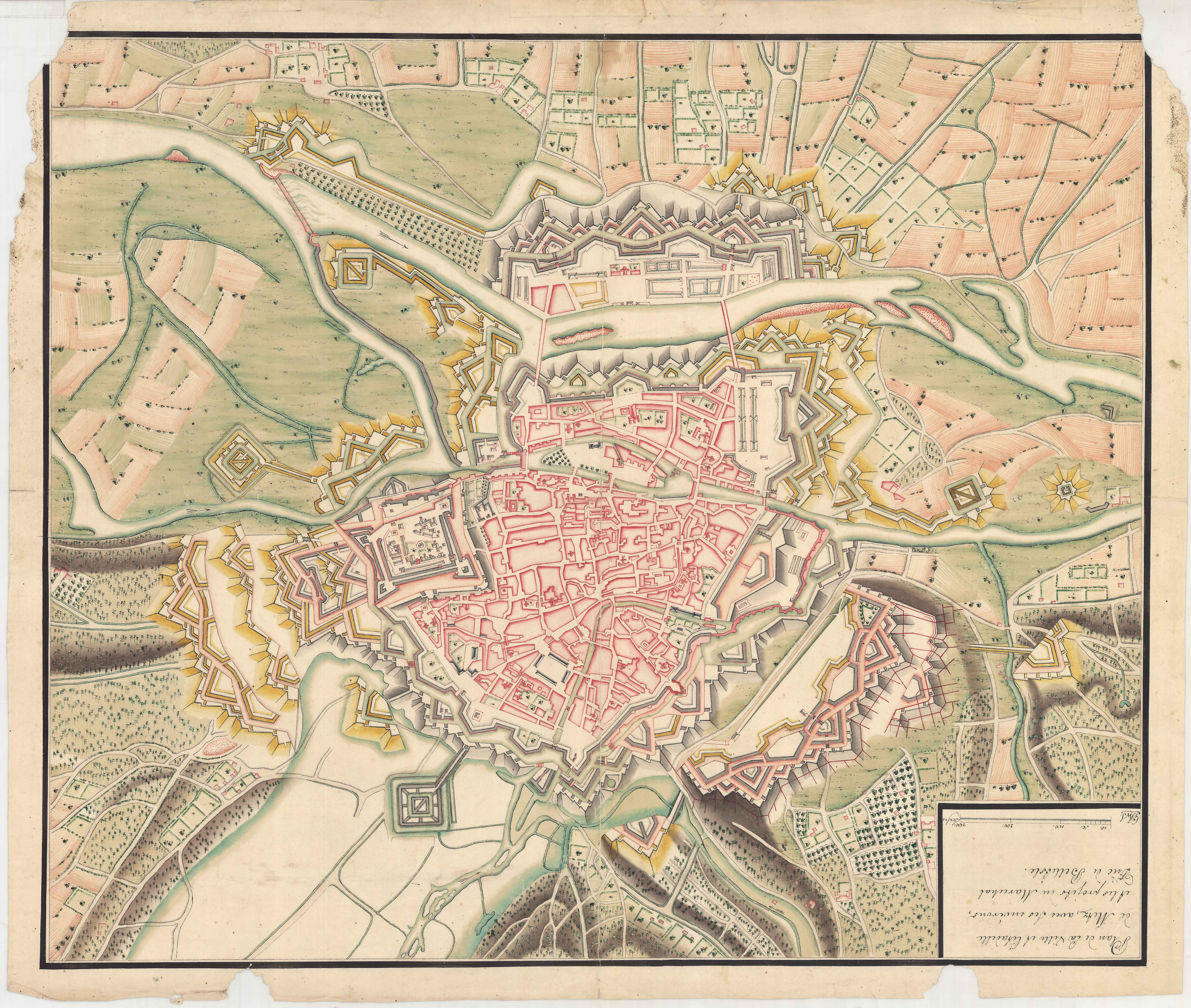
Fortress of Metz 1726

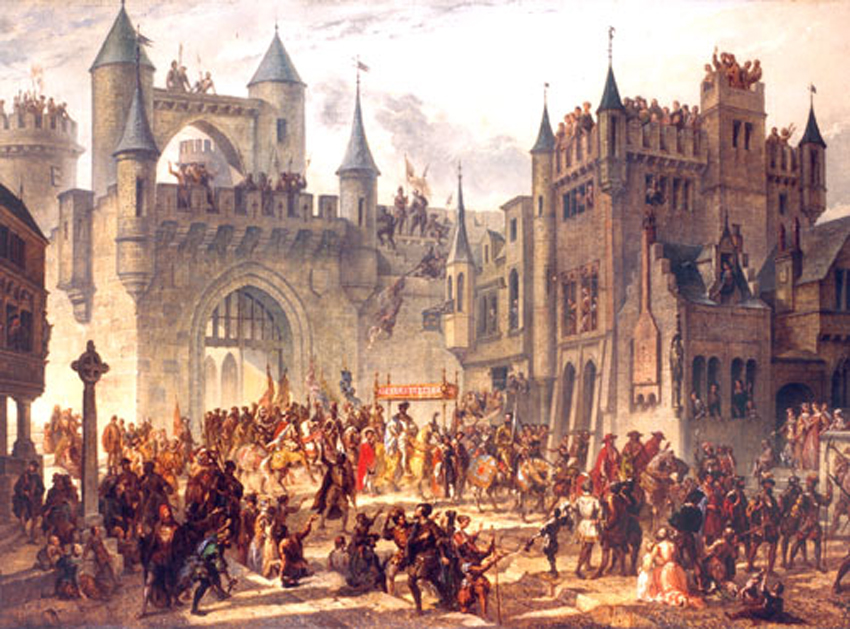
Ending of the Republic of Metz. Entrance of Henry II, King of France on 18 April 1552.

In 1552, King Henry II of France and members of the Schmalkaldic League signed the Treaty of Chambord and Metz passed de facto into the hands of the Kings of France. The population of the city peacefully accepted the conditions of the treaty. Emperor Charles V, during the Italian War of 1551–1559, made an attempt to regain overlordship of Metz by force of arms, besieging the city in 1552–1553. However, his troops were defeated by the French army defending the city under the command of Francis, Duke of Guise, and Metz remained French. A bridge castle from the 13th century, the Porte des allemands (German Gate), which played a crucial defensive role during the siege, is still visible today, and bullet impacts from the muskets used during the assaults can be seen on its facade.

Each one of the fortified towns of Your Majesty protects one province, Metz protects the State.

— Vauban to King Louis XIV

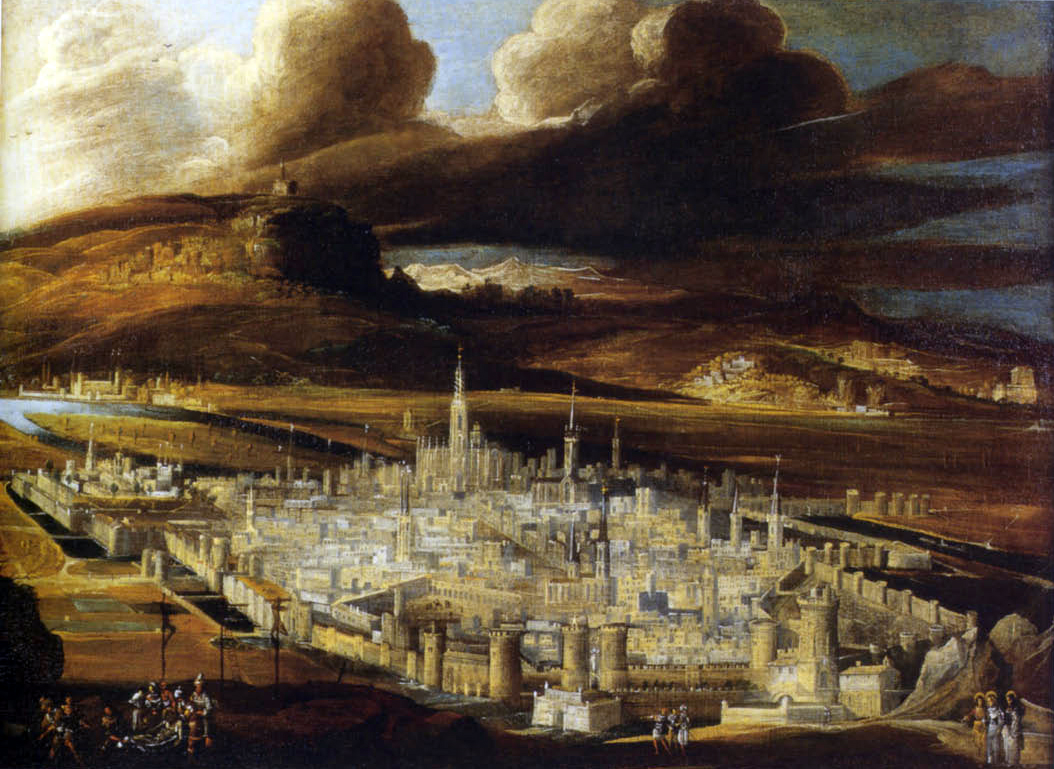
View of Metz from the Bellecroix hill, during the 17th century by Monsù Desidero. Oil painting, ca. 1620, Golden Courtyard museum.

Under the rule of the Kings of France, important constitutional changes were made to the Republic of Metz. In 1565, a few Jewish families were allowed to settle in the town. While the aldermen continued to administer the city, they were appointed by a Royal Governor, representative of the king, and the Bishops came back to Metz. Later, an Intendant and a Bailiff were sent to enforce the king's authority in the city, ultimately putting an end to the Republic of Metz in 1634. The Peace of Westphalia recognized de jure Metz as part the Kingdom of France in 1648, and the city was selected as capital of the Three Bishoprics of Metz, Toul and Verdun. Metz was now a strategic fortified town of France, with a citadel by Vauban and Cormontaigne being erected.

=== French Revolution ===
As benefactor of the city between 1736 and 1761, Duke of Belle-Isle initiated the modernization of the centre of Metz. Belle-Isle awarded royal architect Jacques-François Blondel in 1755 for the embellishment of the town square and the construction of the Hôtel de Ville (city hall), the parliament, and lodgings for the guard. He brought about the development of the Royal Governor's palace and an opera house, and in 1760 created the National Academy of Metz, which still operates.

During the course of the 18th century, the population of the city embraced the ideas carried by the Enlightenment and later French Revolution. In 1775, Lafayette met Charles-François de Broglie, marquis de Ruffec, and Prince William Henry, Duke of Gloucester and Edinburgh, in the present-day courthouse, and decided to support the American Revolutionary War. Also, future revolutionary leader Maximilien de Robespierre and abolitionist Abbé Grégoire were decorated by the National Academy of Metz in 1784 and 1787 respectively, for their essays on capital punishment and in favour of the education of underprivileged people and religious tolerance. With creation of the departments by the Estates-General of 1789, Metz became the capital of the Department of Moselle. General François Christophe Kellermann led the local Army of the Moselle during the French Revolutionary Wars, notably at the decisive Battle of Valmy against the Prussian troops. The French Revolution also brought hardship, and a guillotine for executions was erected during the Reign of Terror on the forecourt of the opera house, known then as the Place de l'égalité (Equality Square), today the Place de la comédie.

=== First and Second French Empires ===
Later, Metz was besieged by the Sixth Coalition during the campaign of 1814 against Napoleonic France, but the Allies were unable to take the city defended by General Pierre François Joseph Durutte and his army. In 1861, during the Second French Empire, Metz hosted the fourth universal world's fair in the Place de la république and the Esplanade gardens.

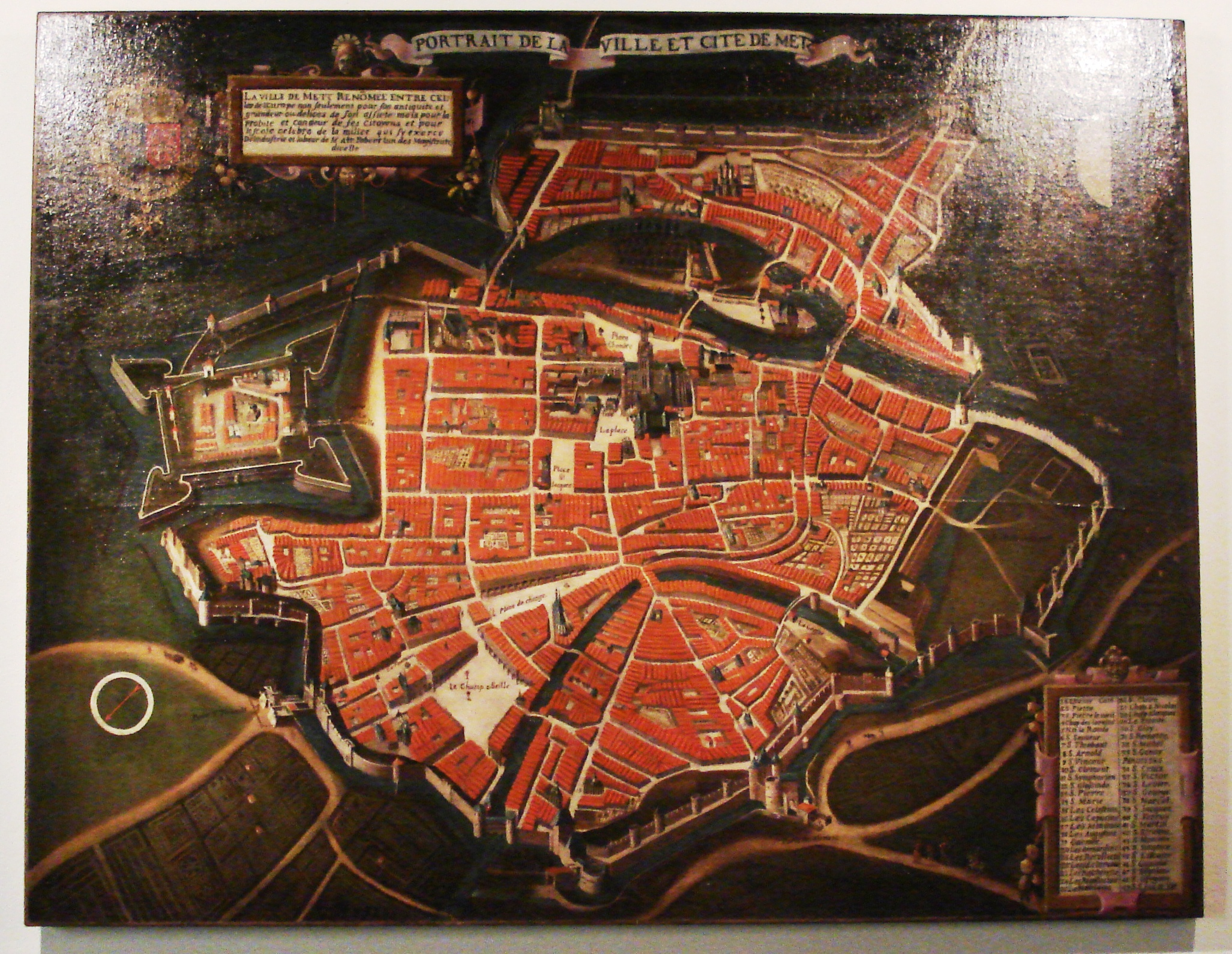
City scape of the Metz citadel built by Cormontaigne.

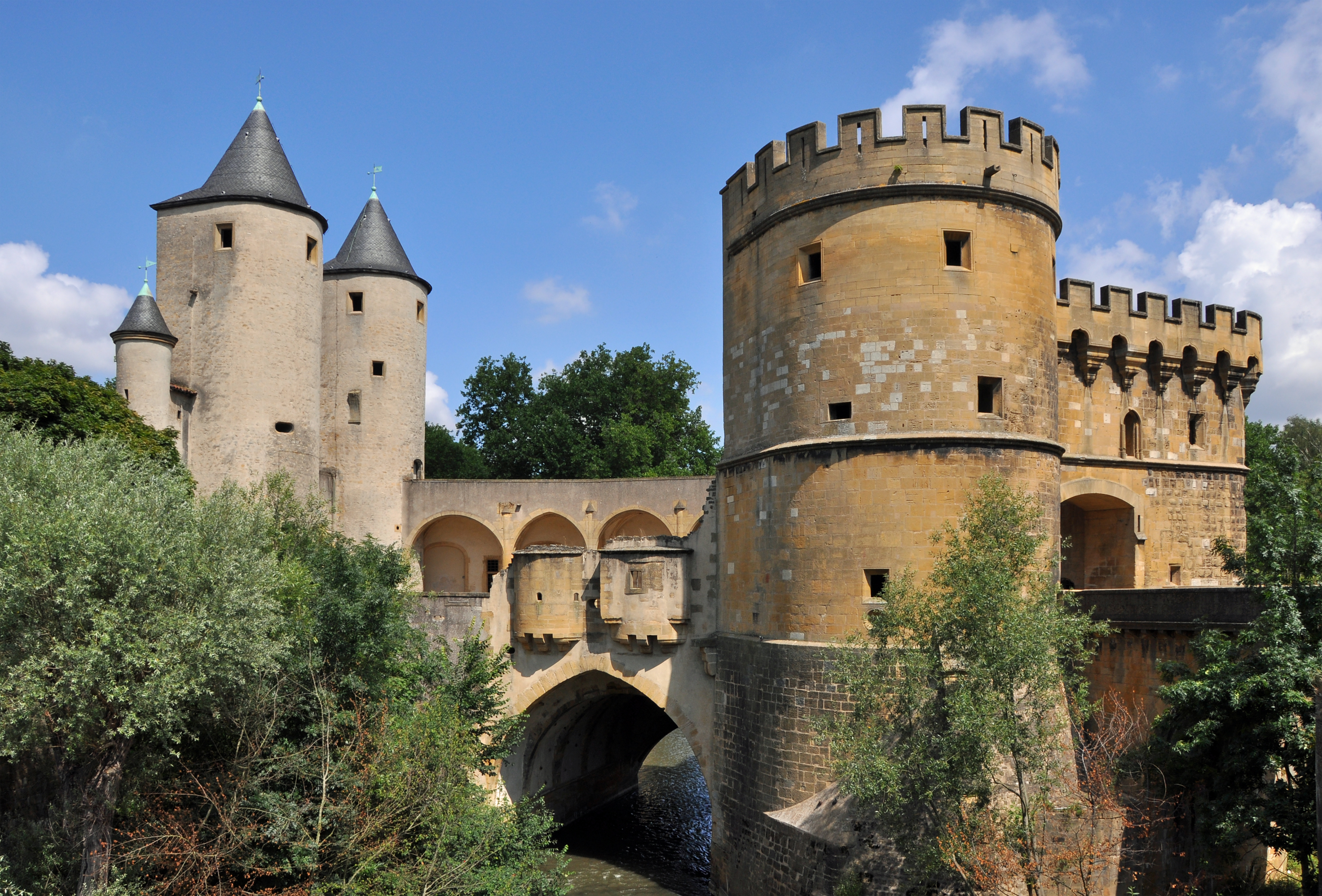
The Germans' Gate from the 13th century. It played an important defensive role during the siege of the city in 1552–1553.

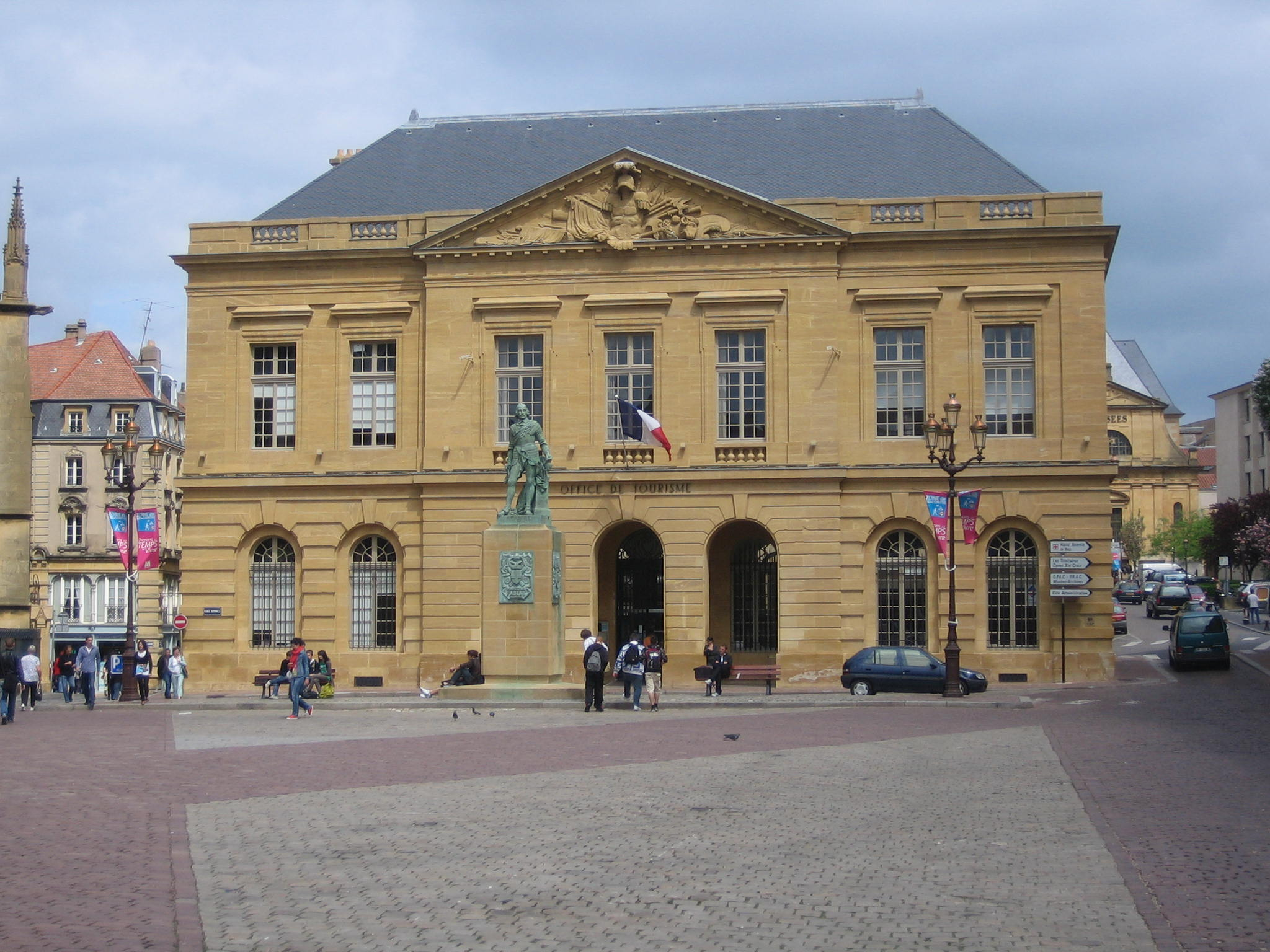
Example of work of Jacques-François Blondel, who redesigned and modernized the centre of Metz in the context of Enlightenment.

== The First German annexation ==
=== The Franco-Prussian War (1870-1871) ===
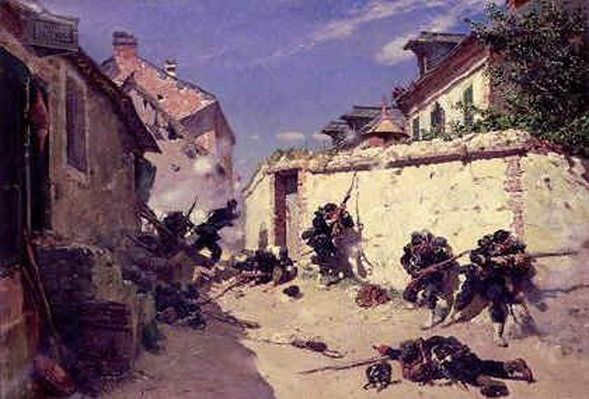
Surprise attack on the suburbs of Metz, during the Franco-Prussian War.

During the Franco-Prussian War of 1870–1871, Metz was the headquarters of the army under the command of General Bazaine. After the battles of Colombey, Mars-la-Tour, and Gravelotte, Bazaine retreated into the defenses of Metz and surrendered after several months of siege. The first airmail carrier was launched during the siege of the city by Doctor Julien-François Jeannel with the help of some officers of the Imperial Guard near the present-day France's square. French officer Louis Rossel, who participated to the defense of Metz during the siege, joined up with the Paris Commune in opposition to the felony of General Bazaine negotiating with and surrendering Metz to the Germans.

=== A German garrison town ===
Under the Treaty of Frankfurt of 1871, Metz was annexed into the newly created German Empire, being part of the Imperial Territory of Alsace-Lorraine administered directly by the imperial government from Berlin. The German-annexed bulk of the former Département Moselle and the two arrondissements of the former Département Meurthe also seized to Germany were merged into the German Département de la Lorraine with Metz as its capital. The departmental parliament (Bezirkstag von Lothringen/Conseil Général de la Lorraine) had its seat in Metz too, it delegated 10 members into the parliament of Alsace-Lorraine between 1874 and 1911, when its members were finally elected directly by the electorate.

The city kept its strategic military role and became an important German garrison town and the Germans decided to build second and third fortified lines around Metz. The dismantlement of parts of the medieval ramparts led to the extension of the city outside of its historical urban planning and the new Imperial Quarter was created. The urban architects, under the direct guidance of Emperor Wilhelm II, had to respond to two major challenges in planning the new district: the requirement of the military strategies and the erection of a functional and artistic ensemble. Indeed, the army required a well-planned district built with the prospect of a war between Germany and France in mind and strategically integrated to the Schlieffen plan. So the Metz railway station was directly linked to Berlin via the Kanonenbahn Cannons Railway. In parallel, the district should be a symbol of dynamism of a new modern city accommodating the upper class. The district encompassed the residence of Emperor Wilhelm II in the former Kaiser Headquarters (present-day Northeast France defense headquarters) during his frequent visits to Metz.

== Interwar period: Return to France ==
Following the armistice with Germany ending the First World War, the French army entered Metz in November 1918 and Philippe Pétain received his marshal's baton from French President Raymond Poincaré and Prime Minister Georges Clémenceau on the Esplanade garden. The city returned to France under the Treaty of Versailles in 1919.

== Second German annexation: World War II ==
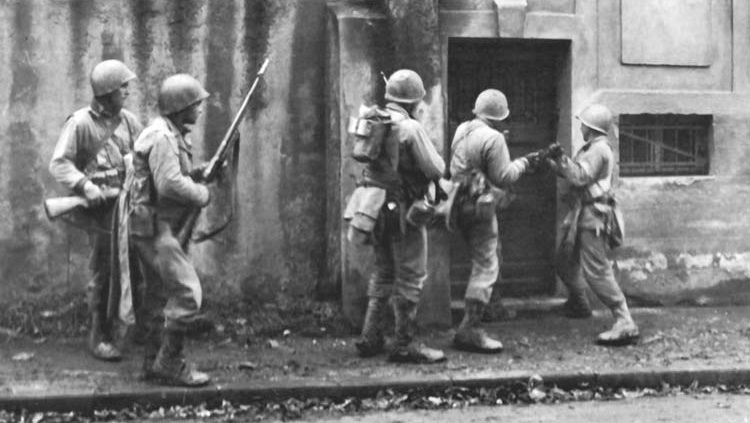
Troops of US 5th Infantry Division conducting a house-to-house search in Metz on 19 November 1944.

In the hell of fire along the Moselle and around the mighty forts of Metz you proved your courage, your resourcefulness, and your skill.

— General Harry L. Twaddle, commander of the 95th Infantry Division to his troops, The Iron Men of Metz

However, after the Battle of France in 1940 during the Second World War, the city was annexed once more by the German Third Reich into a Reichsgau named Westmark. As a symbol of the German annexation, Chancellor Adolf Hitler celebrated Christmas 1940 at the former bergamt of the Imperial District of Metz, but local people largely rejected the German occupation. Multiple French Resistance cells were active during this period in the region of Metz, such as the Mario and the Derhan groups, whose activities included collecting arms for the Liberation, distributing flyers, helping prisoners and resisters, and sabotage. Several resistants were detained and tortured in the Fort of Queuleu in Metz and Jean Moulin died in Metz's railway station while on a train in transit to Germany. In 1944, the attack on the city by the U.S. Third Army under the command of General George S. Patton faced heavy resistance from the defending German forces. The Battle of Metz lasted for several weeks and Metz was finally captured by the Americans in November 1944, and the city reverted to France after the war.

== Post-war period to the present day ==
During the 1950s, Metz was chosen to be the capital of the newly created Lorraine region. With the creation of the European Communities and the latter European Union and under the leadership of Robert Schuman, Metz became a central place of the Greater Region and the SaarLorLux Euroregion. In 1979, the city was home to the Metz Congress, the seventh national congress of the French Socialist Party, during which future French President François Mitterrand won the nominating process of the French presidential election of 1981 after defeating the internal opposition led by Michel Rocard. Later, Pope John Paul II delivered a Mass in the Saint-Stephen Cathedral during his visit to Metz in 1988 and pleaded in his speech for the European unity in the context of the Cold War. In 2010, Metz opened a branch of the French National Museum of Modern Art, the Centre Pompidou-Metz, designed by Japanese architect Shigeru Ban and inaugurated by French President Nicolas Sarkozy.

== See also ==
- Timeline of Metz
