= Hôtel de Ville, Metz =

Town hall in Metz, France

Hôtel de Ville
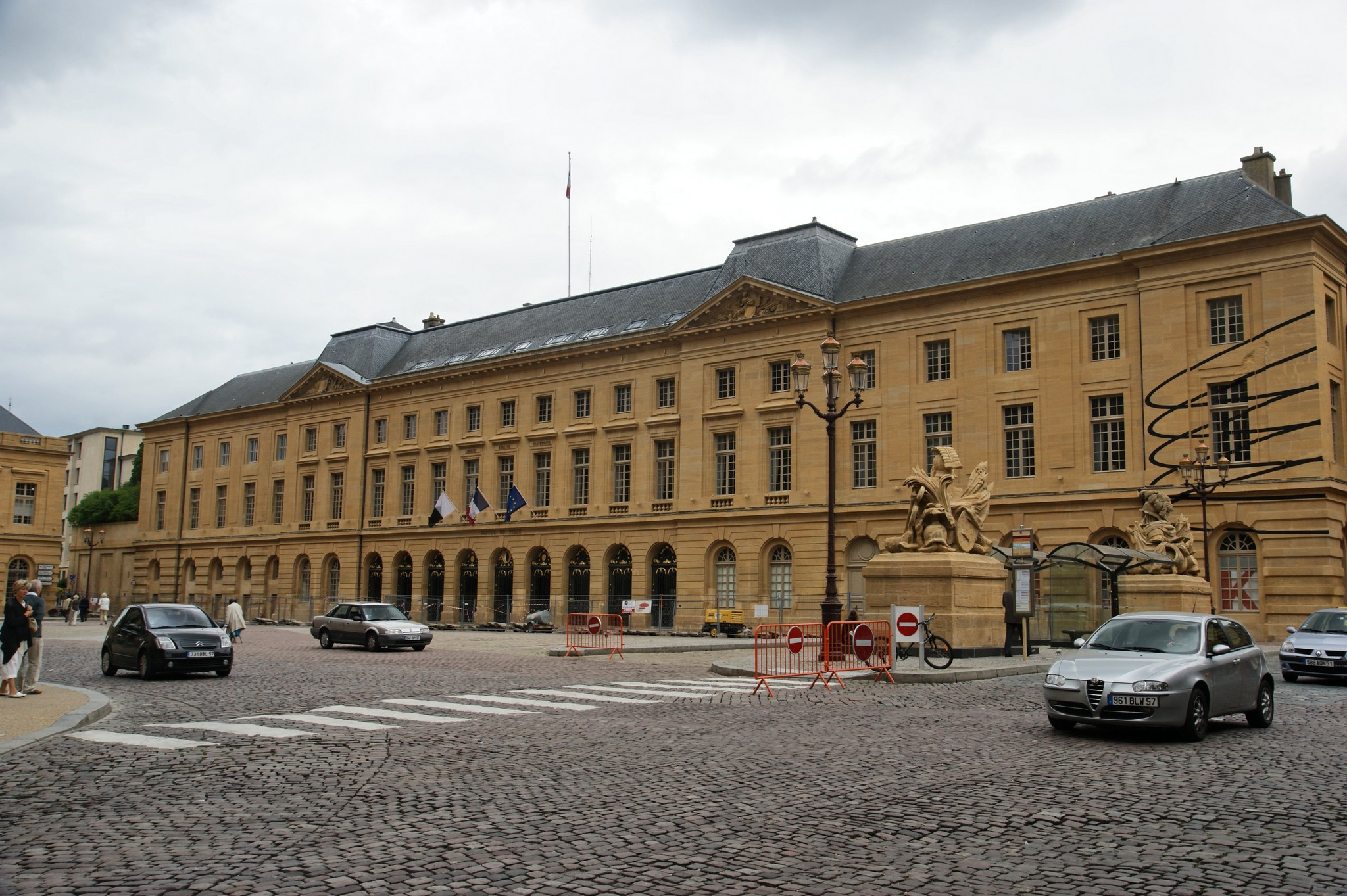
- The main frontage of the Hôtel de Ville in June 2009

General information
- Type: City hall
- Architectural style: Neoclassical style
- Location: Metz, France
- Coordinates: 49.1196°N 6.1763°E
- Completed: 1771

Design and construction
- Architect: Jacques-François Blondel

Monument historique
- Official name: Hôtel de ville
- Type: Inscrit
- Designated: 1922
- Reference no.: PA00106852

The Hôtel de Ville (French pronunciation: [otɛl də vil], City Hall) is a municipal building in Metz, Moselle, northeast France, standing on the Place D'Armes. It was designated a monument historique by the French government in 1922.

== History ==
Early meetings of the local council were held in a room in the Palais des Treize (Palace of the Thirteen) to the southwest of Metz Cathedral. It was a castellated building, designed in the Gothic style, which was completed in 1317.

In the mid-18th century, the governor of the Three Bishoprics, Charles Louis Auguste Fouquet, Duke of Belle-Isle, launched an initiative to redevelop the city centre. The initiative involved the demolition of many of the older buildings, including the Palais des Treize, and the construction of a series of prominent buildings around several new squares. The first two of these squares were on l'île du Petit-Saulcy: the Place de la Comédie, and the Place de la Préfecture. The intention was to follow this up with a grand civic square, the Place D'Armes.

The largest of the proposed buildings on the Place D'Armes was the new town hall. Construction of the new building started in 1761. It was designed by Jacques-François Blondel in the neoclassical style, built in ashlar stone and was completed in 1771. An extra wing was completed in 1788. The design involved a symmetrical main frontage of 23 bays facing onto the Place D'Armes with the end bays slightly projected forward. The main frontage was 92 metres (302 ft) long. The ground floor was rusticated and featured a series of round headed openings with voussoirs and keystones. The openings in the central section of nine bays contained wrought iron gates. The first floor was fenestrated by tall casement windows with cornices, while the second floor was fenestrated by square casement windows. The two-bay sections on either side of the central section were also slightly projected forward and surmounted by pediments with fine carvings in the tympana. At roof level, there was a modillioned cornice. The carvings in the typana were sculpted by Jean Chrysostome Rollier, who came from Lille.

Internally, there was a fine staircase with wrought iron banisters, flanked by statues representing justice and prudence, leading up to the Salon D'Honneur and the Salon De Guise, both on the first floor. Medallions depicting famous people from Metz, such as the artist, Sébastien Leclerc, the physiologist, Antoine Louis, and the balloonist, Jean-François Pilâtre de Rozier, were installed in the Salon D'Honneur, and stained glass windows, designed by a local artist, Charles-Laurent Maréchal, were installed in the Salle De Guise. A portrait of the French cavalry commander, General Antoine Charles Louis de Lasalle, who commanded a division during the Napoleonic Wars was installed in the building in the 19th century.

After the signing of the armistice at the end of the First World War, which returned Metz and other towns and cities in Alsace–Lorraine to France, Marshal Ferdinand Foch reviewed a march past in front of the town hall on 26 November 1918. Following the liberation of Metz by the US XX Corps on 22 November 1944, during the Second World War, a plaque was unveiled at the base of a memorial, slightly to the southwest of the town hall, to commemorate the handover of the town by General Walton Walker to the French authorities.

An extensive programme of external works, mainly intended to remove the effects of pollution on the façade the building, was completed in December 2007.
