= Museums of Metz =

Museum in Metz, France

Coordinates: 49°07′16″N 6°10′41″E

Musée de la Cour d'Or - Metz Métropole
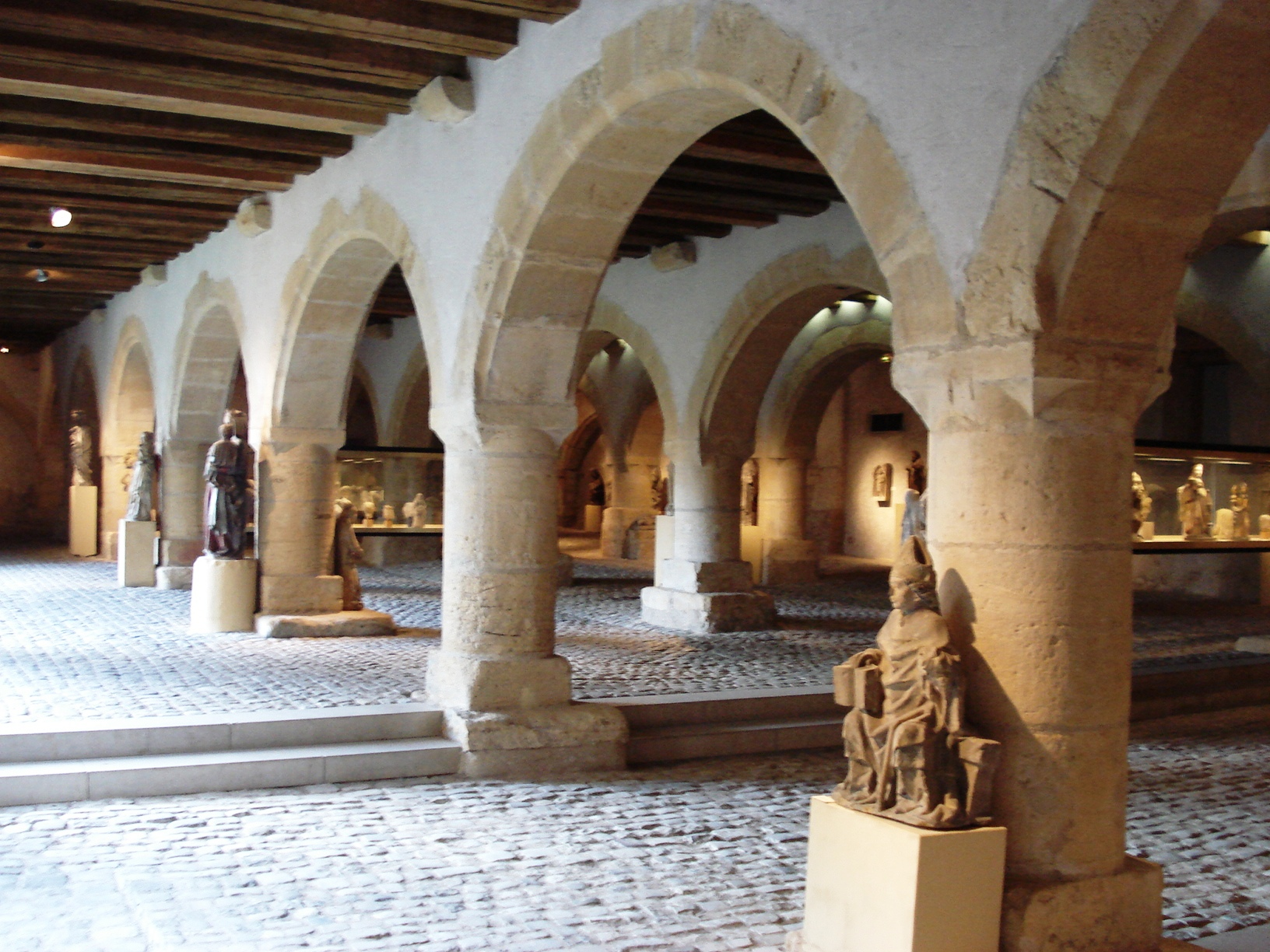
- Statuary of the Chèvremont granary
- Established: 1839
- Location: 2 rue du Haut Poirier, 57000 Metz, France
- Type: archeological museum, medieval museum. architecture Museum, Historic site
- Website: musee.metzmetropole.fr

The Museum of Metz (Musée de la Cour d'Or - Metz Métropole), in Metz, France, was founded in 1839. It is a labyrinthine organization of rooms, incorporating the ancient Petites Carmes Abbey, the Chèvremont granary, and the Trinitaires church. The institution is organized into four broad sections:

- The history and archeological museum, containing rich collections of Gallo-Roman finds — extension works to the museums in the 1930s revealed the vestiges of Gallo-Roman baths;
- The medieval department;
- The museum of architecture;
- The museum of fine arts.

The museum recreates the world of the ancient and medieval city's inhabitants.

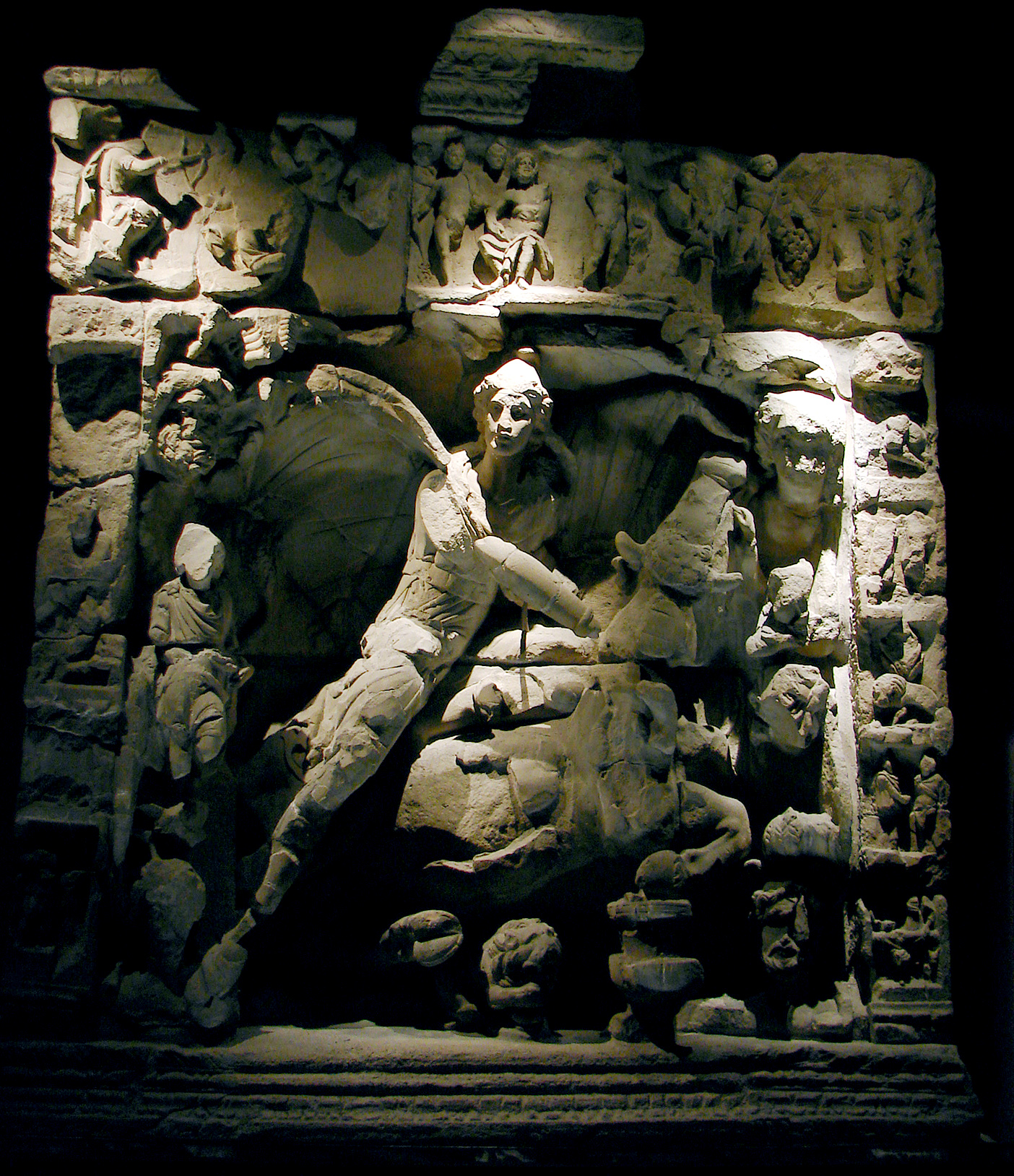
Altar of the oriental god Mithra.

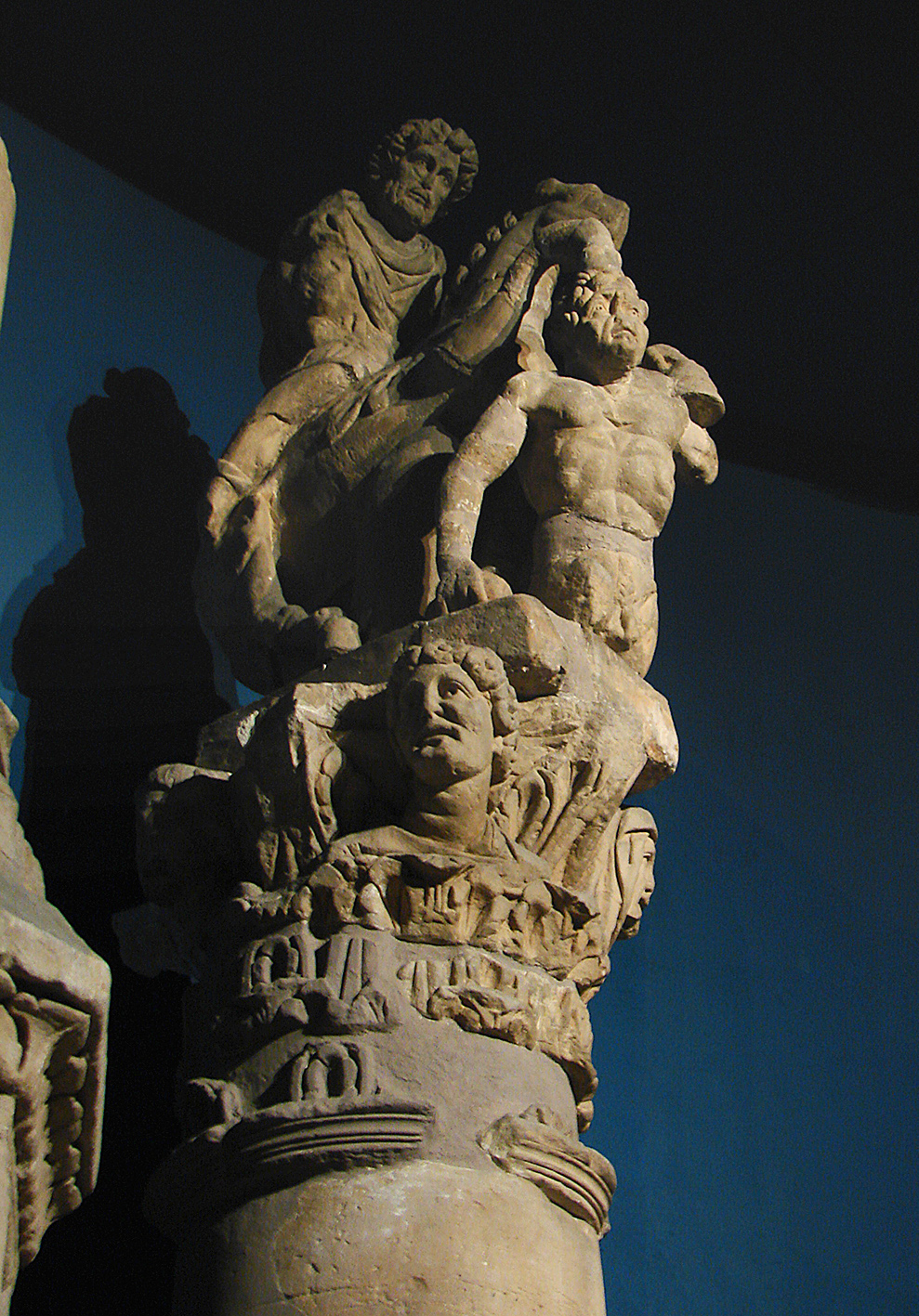
Jupiter Column of Merten

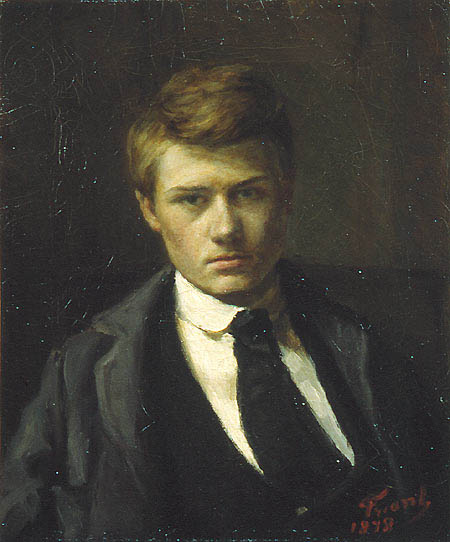
Emile Friant autoportrait

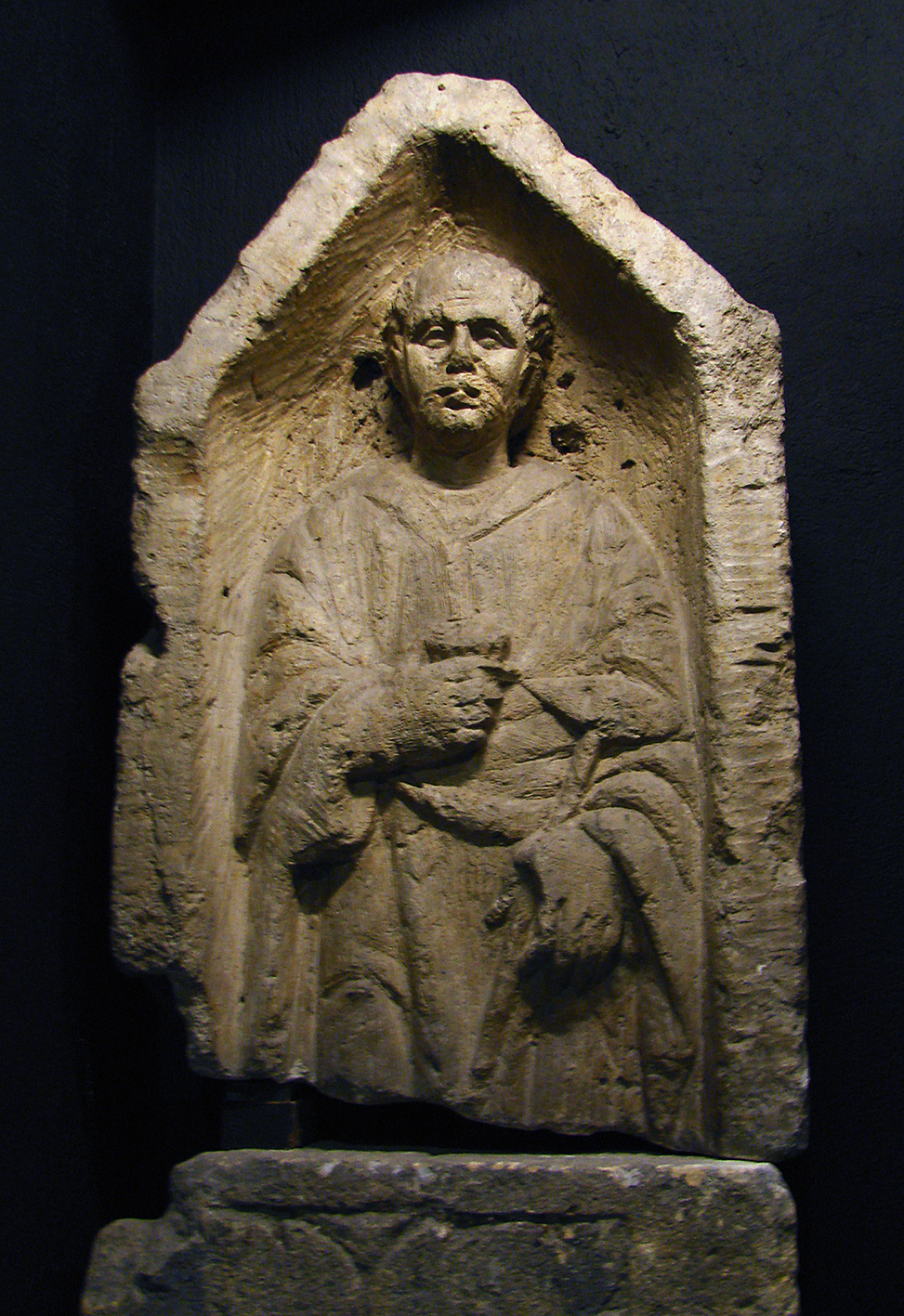
Gallo-Roman Stele of a stonemason

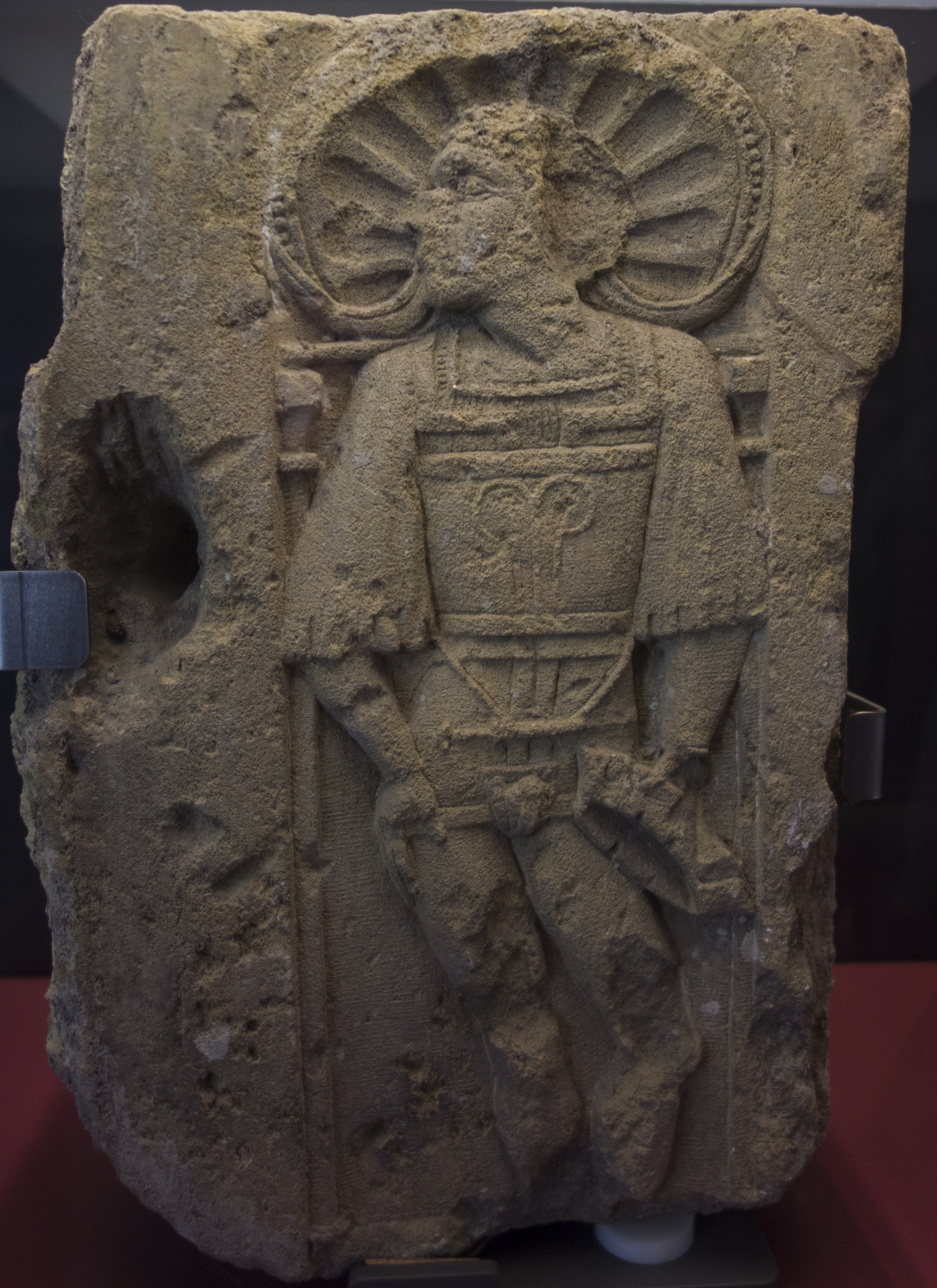
Man with a mouth harp
