= Imperial Quarter of Metz =

District of the city of Metz, France

Coordinates: 49.109°N 6.172°E

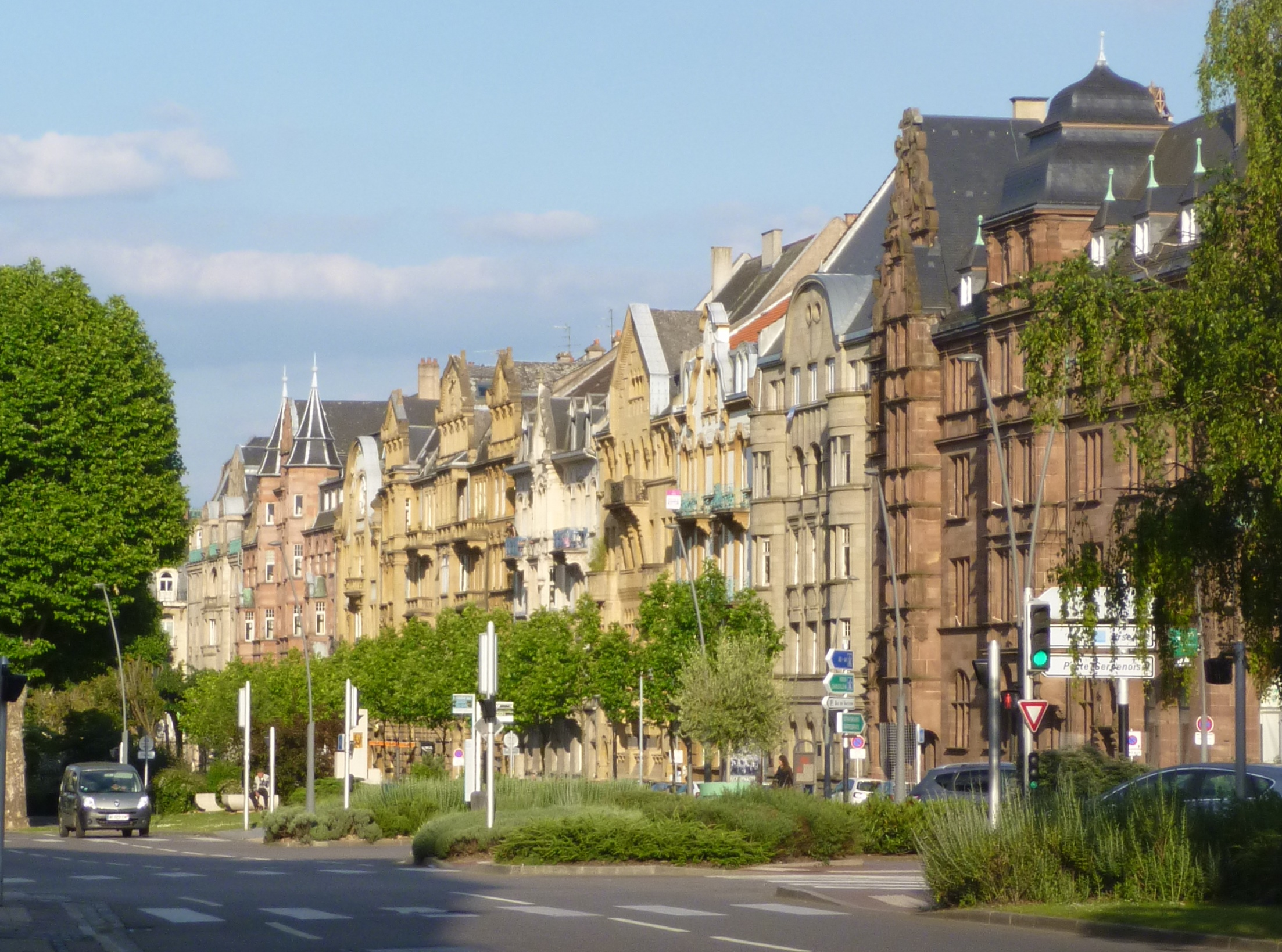
Enfilade of apartment houses along the Avenue Foch, seen from the Avenue Joffre, in the Imperial Quarter of Metz. These are characteristic of much of the mixed-use structures in the district, built between 1902 and 1914.

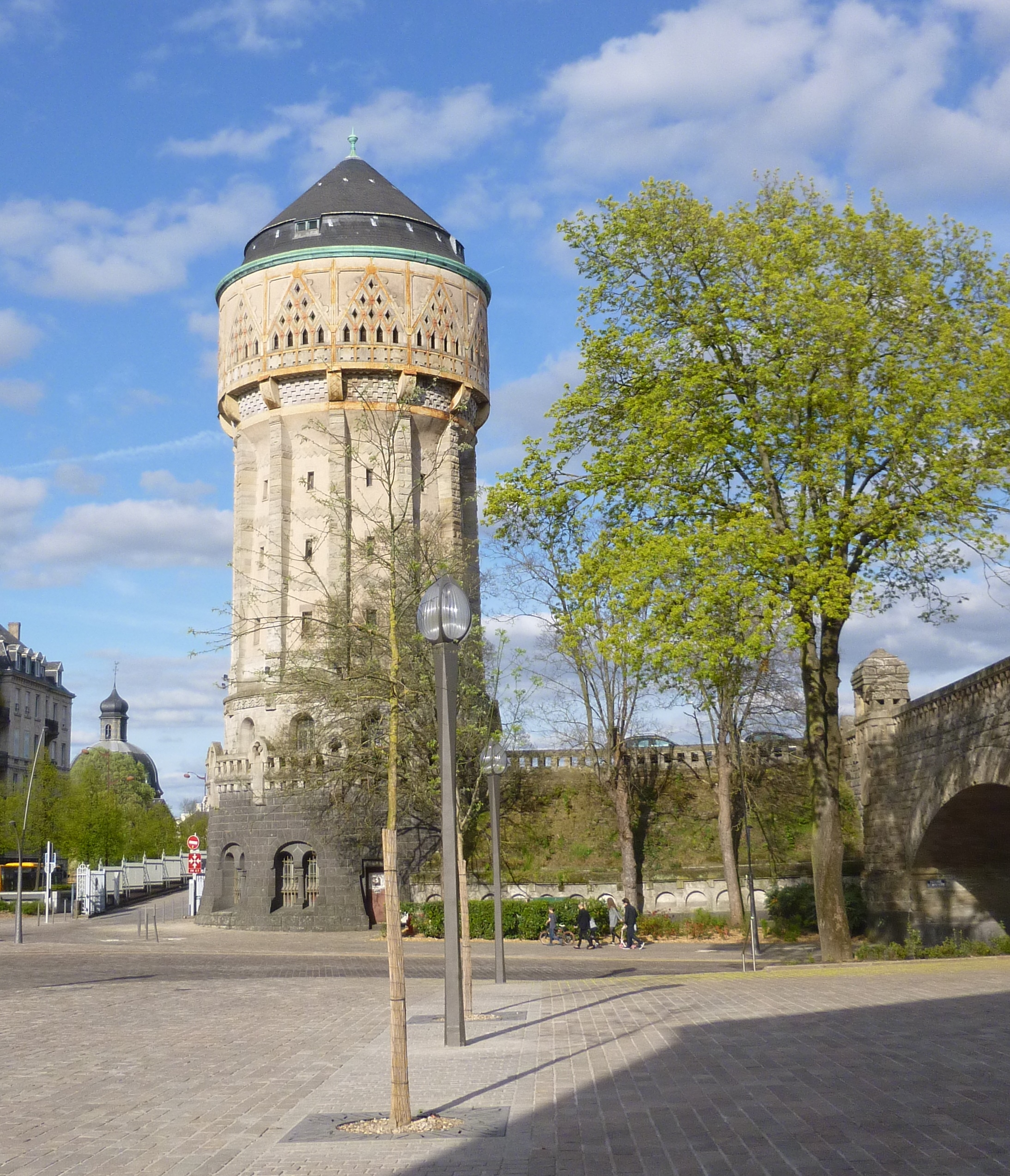
The water tower near the main railway station, one of the delineators of the informal boundaries of the Imperial Quarter. It used to provide water for steam-powered locomotives.

The Imperial Quarter of Metz is a district of the city of Metz, in the région of Grand-Est, in eastern France, initially built between 1902 and 1914 by the government of the ruling German Wilhelmine Empire, during the period of annexation of Alsace-Lorraine. Originally named "Neue Stadt" (literally "new city"), it is today divided between the administrative district of New Ville and Metz-Centre.

It is principally represented by the "Imperial Triangle," delineated by the area in between the water tower of the main railway station, St. Therese's Church, and the Serpenoise Gate. But the district extends beyond this core to include other edifices of the same period, such as the Governor's Palace, situated on the Place Giraud, behind the Serpenoise Gate.

Aside from the more important Neustadt district of Strasbourg, the Imperial Quarter of Metz contains the most complete and best-preserved examples of urbanism under the German Empire. In Germany itself, the comparable districts of such cities often suffered the bombardment by Allied forces in the Second World War. The Imperial Quarter is remarkable for the multiplicity of architectural styles represented, despite the voluntary Germanization assumed by the city.

== History ==
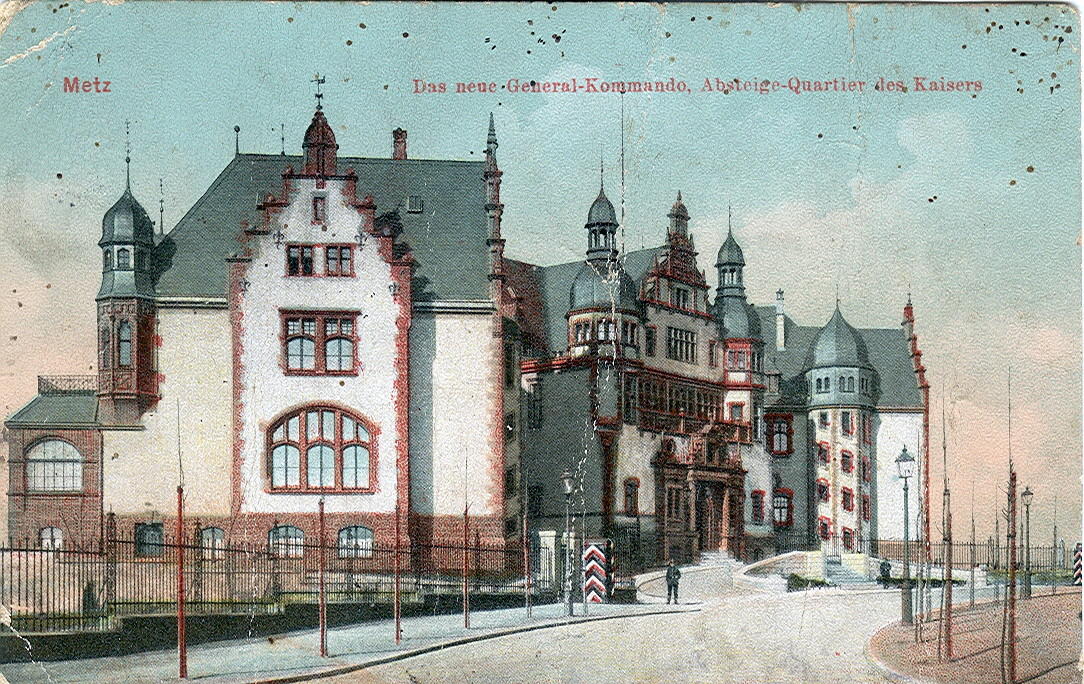
Das neue Generalkommando. Absteige-Quartier des Kaisers, vintage postcard dated 31 July 1917, showing the headquarters of the German Army garrison constructed in the Imperial Quarter between 1902 and 1914.

Up until the beginning of the twentieth century, the district was generally referred to as the Neue Stadt ("New City"), an area where the German authorities had decided to build a new extension south of the historic center of Metz. The enlargement of the city used the land ceded by the military garrison thanks to the removal of the old medieval city walls by order of Kaiser Wilhelm II in 1898, but most of the development only gathered steam starting in 1902. The moniker "New City" was reborn after the French regained control of Metz in 1918 in the name of the administrative district "Nouvelle Ville."

This urbanization project proceeded under the guise of the modernization of the city of Metz, but equally under a marked desire of Wilhelm's government to Germanize the city. Metz essentially had existed as a city characterized by a French building tradition since the Middle Ages, and despite its inclusion within the boundaries of the Holy Roman Empire, the use of High Gothic architecture was evident in monuments such as the cathedral, which was less Germanic in character than the Cathedral of Strasbourg. Wilhelm II hoped to give the Metz a much more Germanic identity, breaking with the policies instituted under the reign of his grandfather Wilhelm I, wherein stylistic continuity in architecture had generally been respected.

The urban guidelines of 1903 instituted a different status to the north side of the "ring" of open land that was opened up with the demolition of the old ramparts. It stipulated that this area should consist of houses encircles by gardens, having a maximum height of three floors, in order to soften the transition between the older buildings of the city center and the new, taller apartment houses that would populate the areas to the south. The villas on what is today known as the Avenue Foch in Metz exude this kind of neat and tidy character, reflecting the traditions of the period, and use a diverse, usually historicist, set of styles.

== Urbanism and general morphology ==
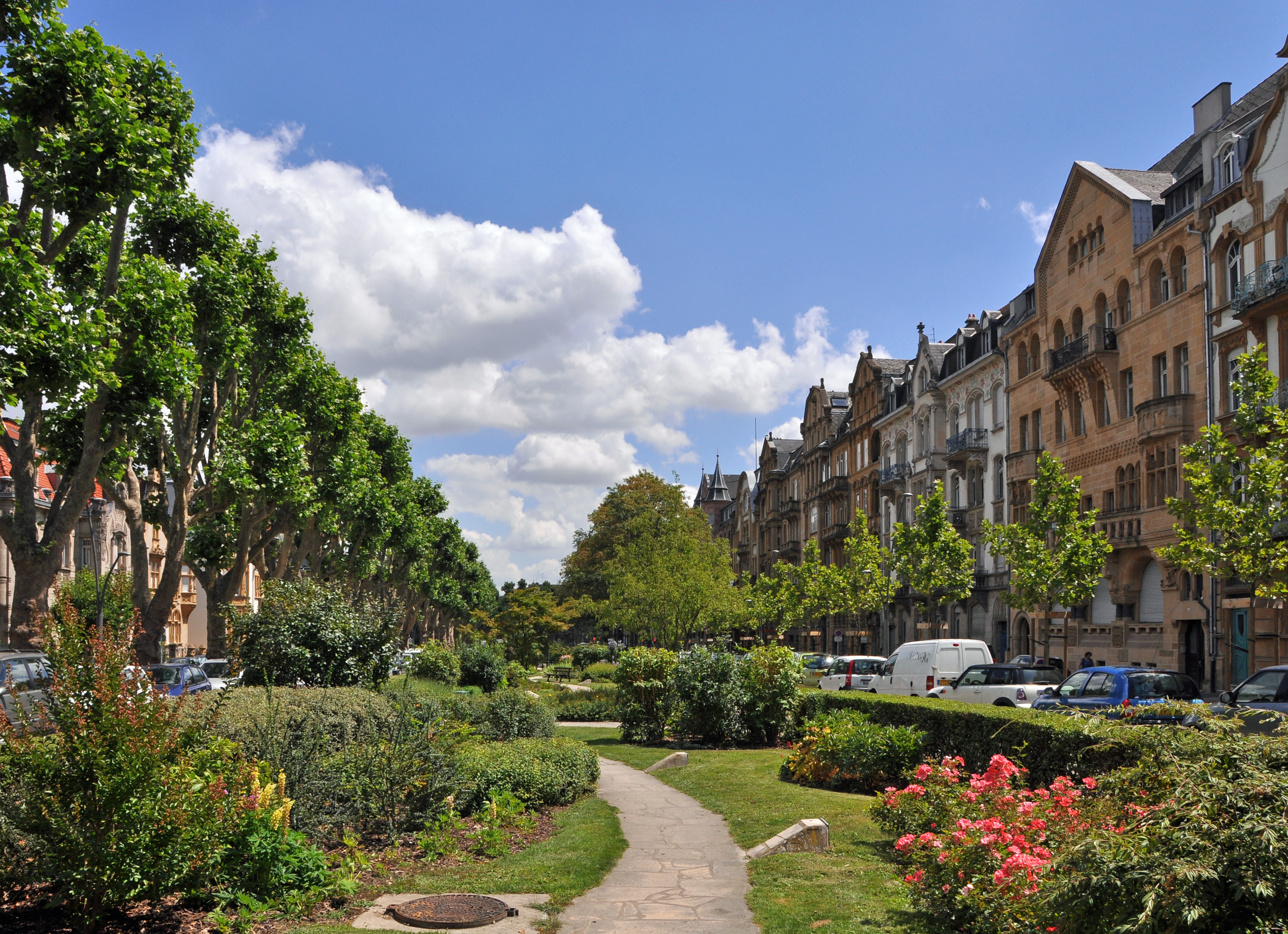
The Avenue Foch with its garden on the median strip.

The Imperial Quarter of Metz is distinguished by broader streets in a ring of urban development loosely defined by its main artery, the Avenue Foch. It is bordered to the north by the old city and to the south by the train lines and yards that form a man-made barrier. In keeping with the general tenets of Haussmannian nineteenth-century urban development, the Imperial Quarter is split up with regularity by large spaces such as public squares and isolated edifices that are distinguished from their neighbors by their style or their verdant surroundings. Thus, despite the dominating presence of rows of apartment buildings, certain parts of the district, such as the Vacquinière, to the southwest, neighboring the city of Montigny-lès-Metz, are composed entirely of mansions. The army installations, which predate the urban development of this area, are equally concentrated to the northwest.

The general organization of the space hinges on two main plazas, the Place Raymond-Mondon (formerly the Place Impériale), and the Place du Général-de-Gaulle, which forms the large forecourt to the main railway station, accessed from the rue Gambetta. When it was known as the Place Impériale, the Place Raymond-Mondon symbolized otherwise the associated powers of the Kaiser (an equestrian statue of whom, located there, was overturned in 1918 by the French). These included financial power, symbolized by the Imperial Bank; the corporate powers of the Chamber of Commerce; military power through the view of the Prince-Frederick-Charles army barracks; and the religious power with a church, whose construction was canceled due to the First World War. This plaza also constituted the junction between the new city and the old districts, as indicated by the preservation of the medieval Tour Camoufle, part of the old city walls.

=== Architecture ===
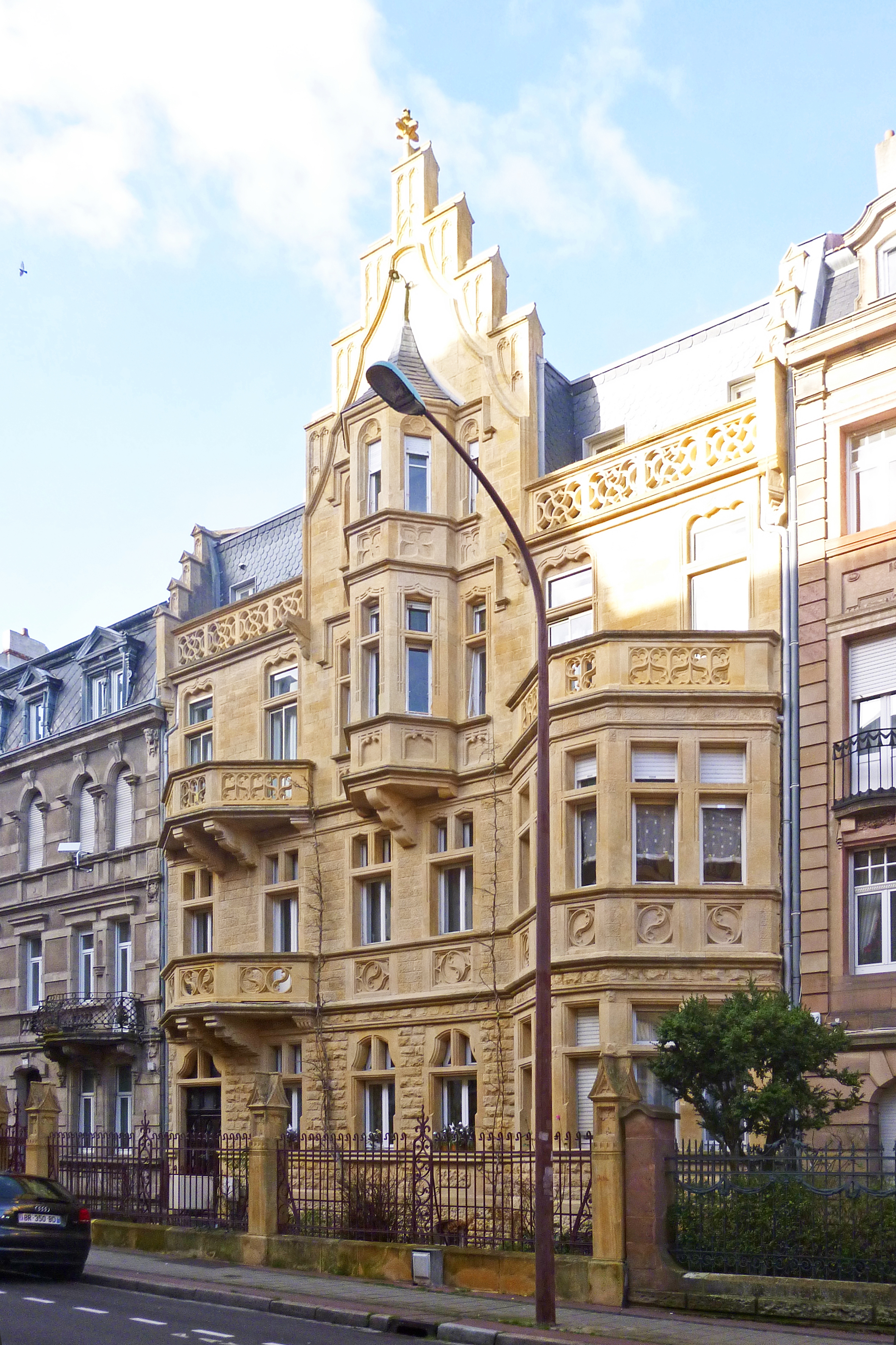
A Gothic-revival building on the rue Mozart in the Imperial Quarter, illustrative of the diversity of historicist architecture in the district.

The district is home to a remarkable diversity of architecture. It served, in effect, as a stylistic laboratory for the German architects in the city during the German Empire. Historicist styles characterize the majority of the buildings, but respond often to the desire of the Imperial state to Germanize the city, which meant that many buildings use architectural styles that recall the German Middle Ages. In turn, the parts of the district constructed during the interwar period (1919–1939) retain the trend of continuing modernization of the city, but in a way that recalls its French heritage.

The period of urbanization during the 1900s and 1910s often revives architectural terms such as Rhenish-Romanesque-revival for Metz's railway station and the main post office, or Flemish-Renaissance-revival for the Governor's Palace. Everywhere one notes a multiplicity of styles in the architecture of private buildings of the era, a development easily visible in the eclectic composition of structures on the Avenue Foch, mixing a kind of Neoclassical rigor with elements of Art Nouveau or traditional Alsatian residences. On the other hand, certain francophile architects maintained their symbolic opposition to the newly entrenched German regime through their preference for neoclassical, Haussmannian apartment buildings. Still others were inspired by currents such as the Vienna Secession, manifest in the so-called Crystal Palace, whose façade was only rediscovered in the 1960s.

The architectural decoration is equally distinctive for its variety of colors, dominated by the grey and pink of buildings constructed of sandstone and the yellow of those constructed out of the pierre de Jaumont, a type of local limestone.

The interwar period, when Metz reverted to French rule, was marked by a "revanchist" architecture, wherein one finds the large-scale use of Haussmannian Neoclassicism and a Baroque revival. These styles harmonize well with the heavy Neoclassicism characteristic of French architecture during the Belle Époque of roughly 1890–1914. These remain, however, less ostentatious overall than the German constructions throughout the rest of the district, out of respect in planning strategies for historic structures, as codified in an ordinance of the city of Metz between 1911 and 1939. In the 1930s, modern architecture also brought the implantation of Art Deco, already in full bloom elsewhere around the world.

== Recognition ==
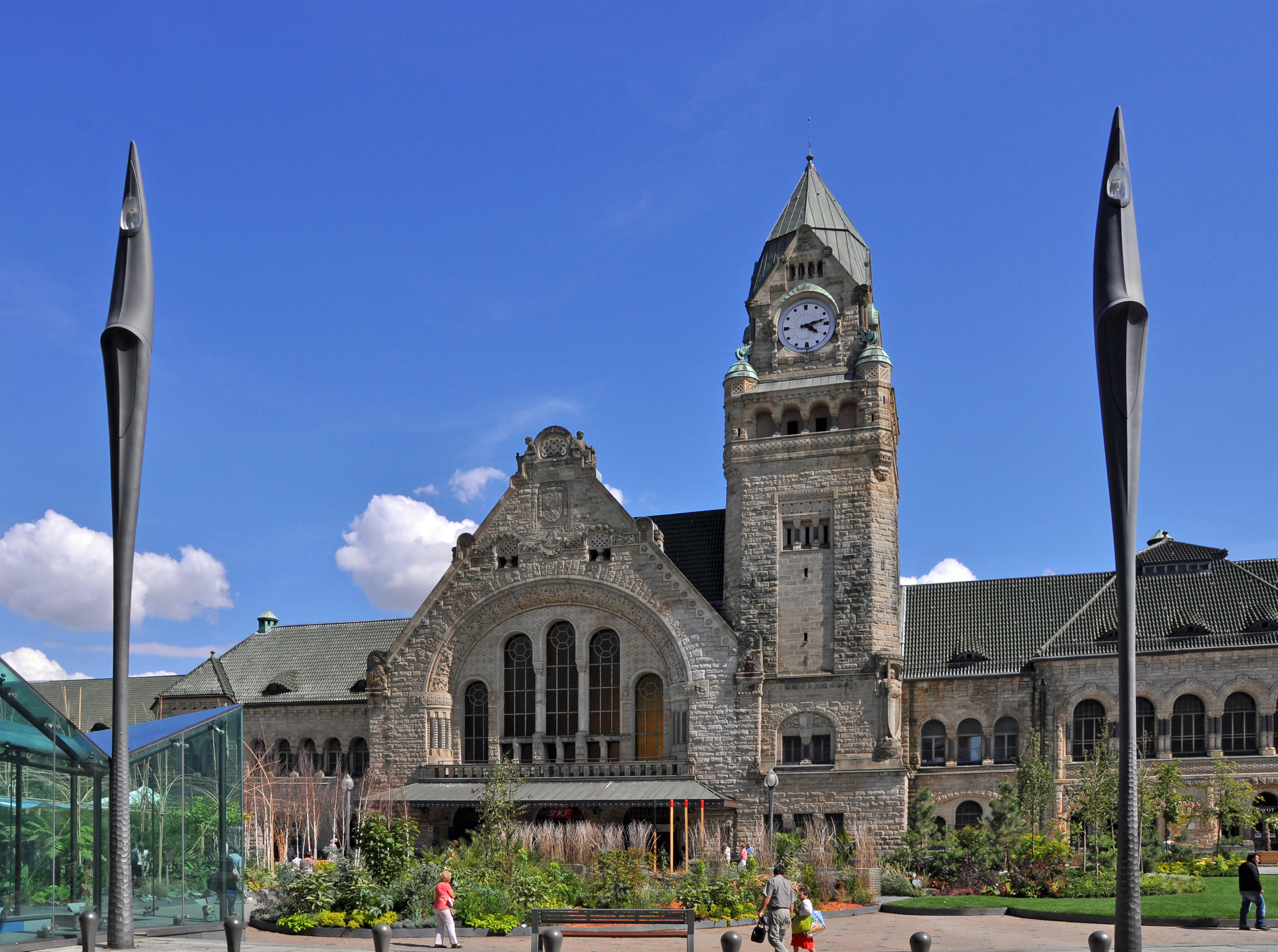
The main railway terminal in Metz serves as the focal point of the Place du Général de Gaulle in the Imperial Quarter.

Even though it is depicted in postcards of Metz from the early twentieth century, the Imperial Quarter was not well-appreciated by Messins of the interwar period. They instead favored the nationalism of the Lorraine native Maurice Barrès, who castigated the architecture of Metz's railway station (which had been designed by the Berlin architect Jürgen Kröger and built between 1905 and 1908): "One welcomes the dignified ambition of a cathedral, but this is only tortuous, an immense paté of meat."

However, starting in the 1980s the Imperial Quarter gained new favor with both local officials and residents. Several campaigns for the renovation and refurbishment of the architectural patrimony of the district began, such as the cleaning of building façades, most notably those of the train station, which had blackened over the years. By 2014, the remaining restorations to take place encompassed a much smaller scale, such as those to the façade of the former Hôtel du Globe, on the Place du Général de Gaulle, facing the train station.

The district was nominated by the city for inscription by UNESCO onto its list of World Heritage Sites in June 2007 due to several features of original urban planning and architectural character:

- The variety of architectural styles, from Romanesque revival to Jugendstil (Art Nouveau), by way of the Baroque
- The variety of colored stone used in construction, such as the pierre de Jaumont, a yellow stone; pink sandstone; or white stone.

When its candidacy was rejected, a new dossier was prepared in 2009 by the office of the mayor of Metz. This new application dubbed the district "Metz Royal and Imperial," thereby putting the emphasis on the double urban identity of the city, playing on the opposition and complementary nature between the "royal" old city around the cathedral (developed under the French monarchy of the ancien régime before 1789), and the Imperial Quarter developed under the Wilhelmine Empire. It thus showed the transformation of urban space from an older, clustered, topographically oriented and organically developed medieval city to the newer, rationally-planned, transportation-oriented and distinctly zoned sectors of the enlarged urban area. One month and a half after its submission to the French Committee for Worldwide Patrimony, the body approved its inscription to the list of French World Heritage Sites of UNESCO, later ratified by the Ministry of Culture and Communication. In April 2014, the internet site for UNESCO added the candidacy of Metz to its page for France.

== Landmarks and important buildings ==
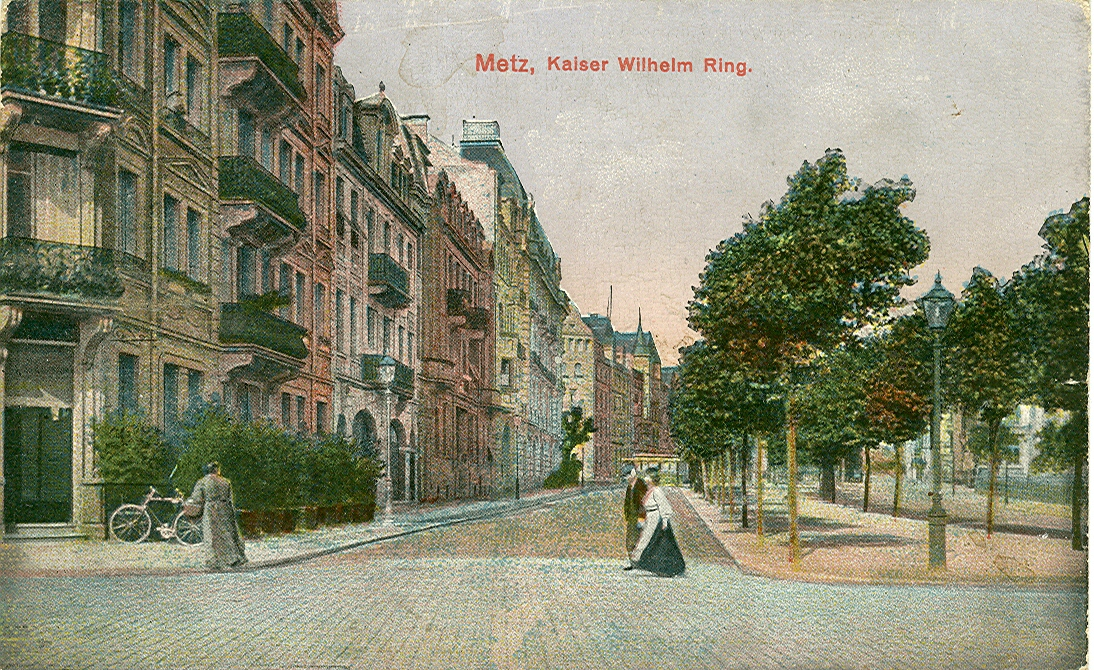
Kaiser Wilhelm Ring, old postcard mailed on 11 February 1917, showing the broad, tree-lined "ring" avenues along the path of the old city walls.

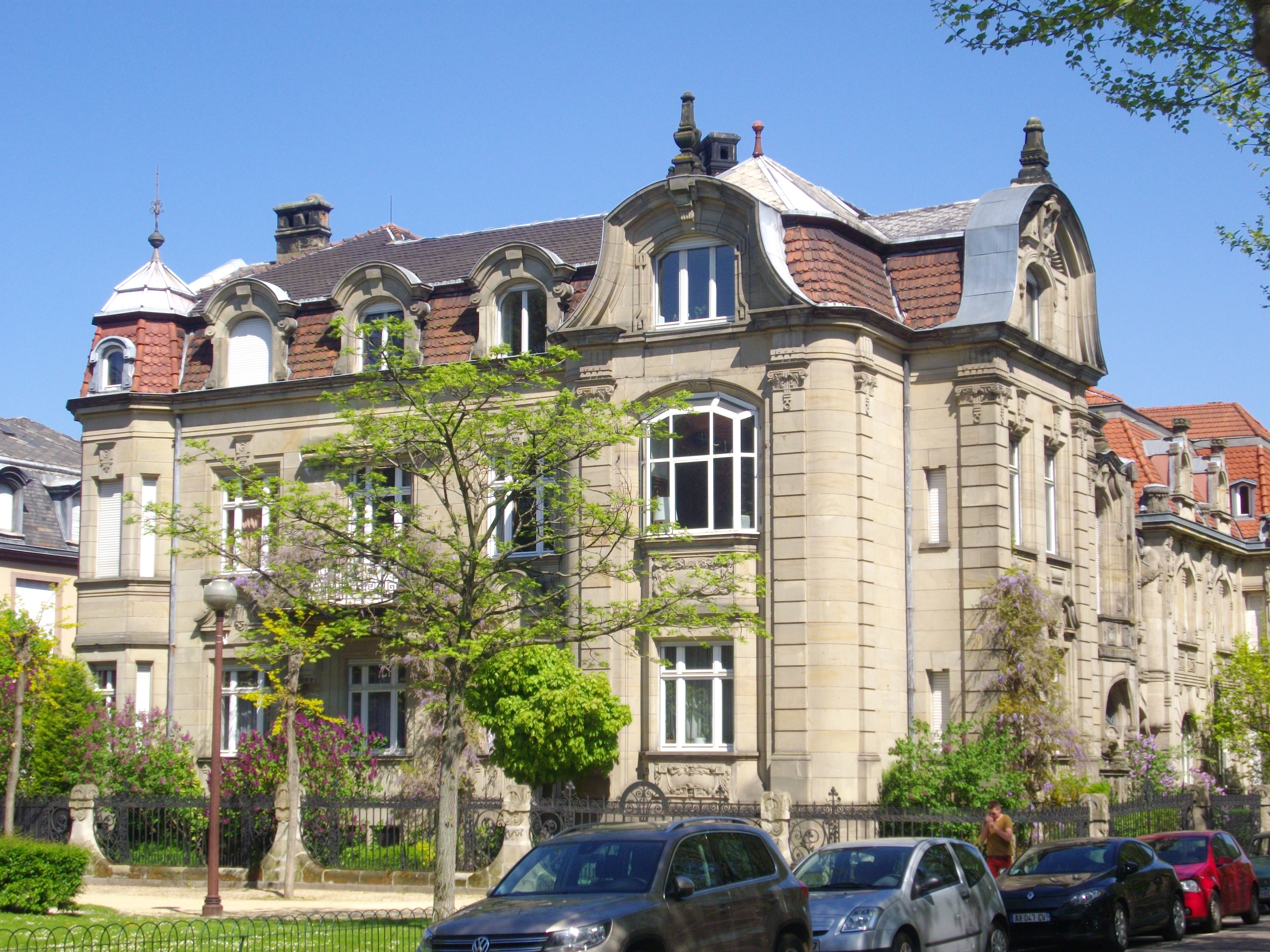
The Baroque-revival Villa Bleyler (1904–06).

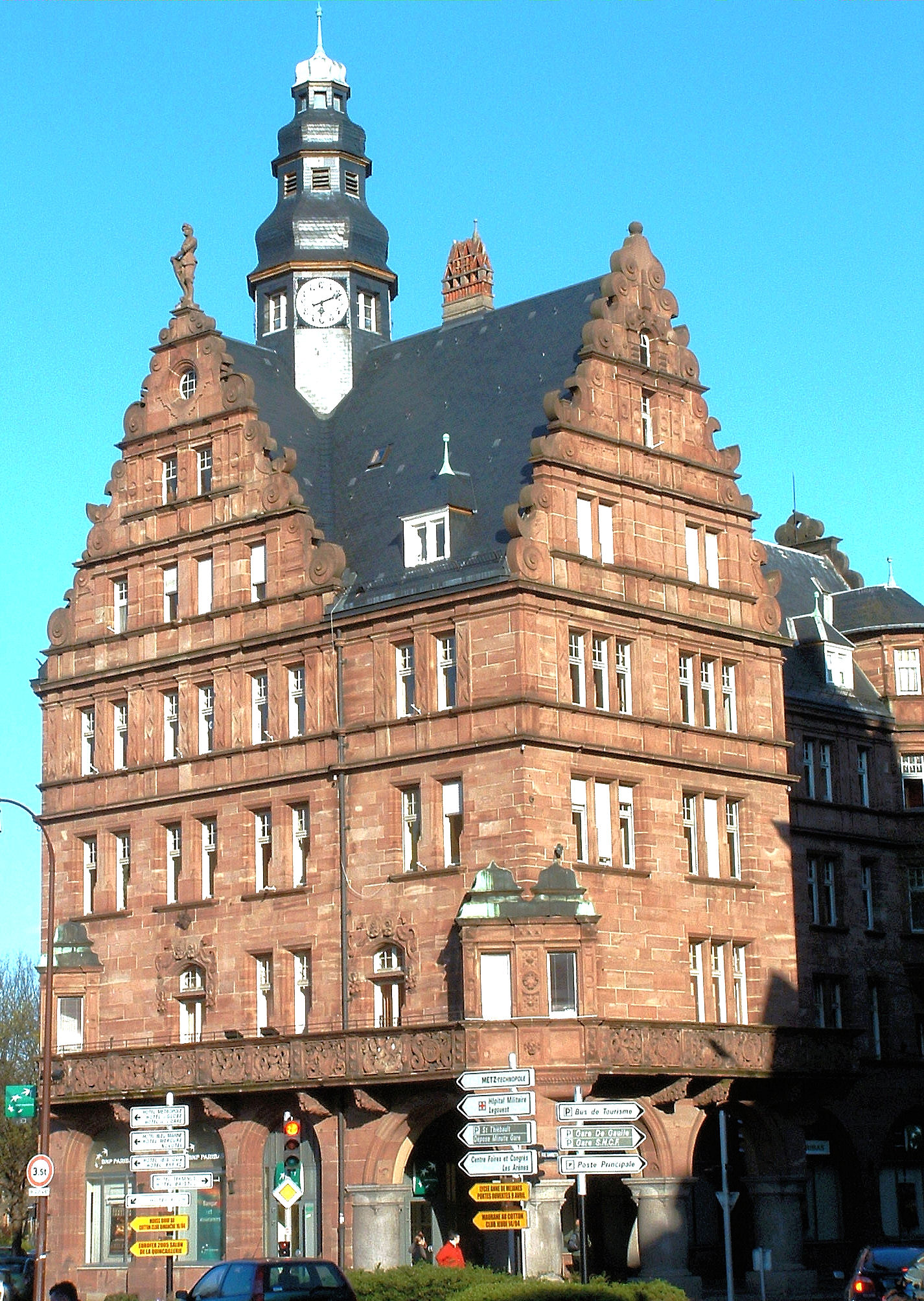
The Hôtel des Arts & Métiers (Hall of Arts & Crafts) housed the Chamber of Commerce when Metz was German territory before 1919. It is distinguished by its Flemish-Renaissance-revival architecture.

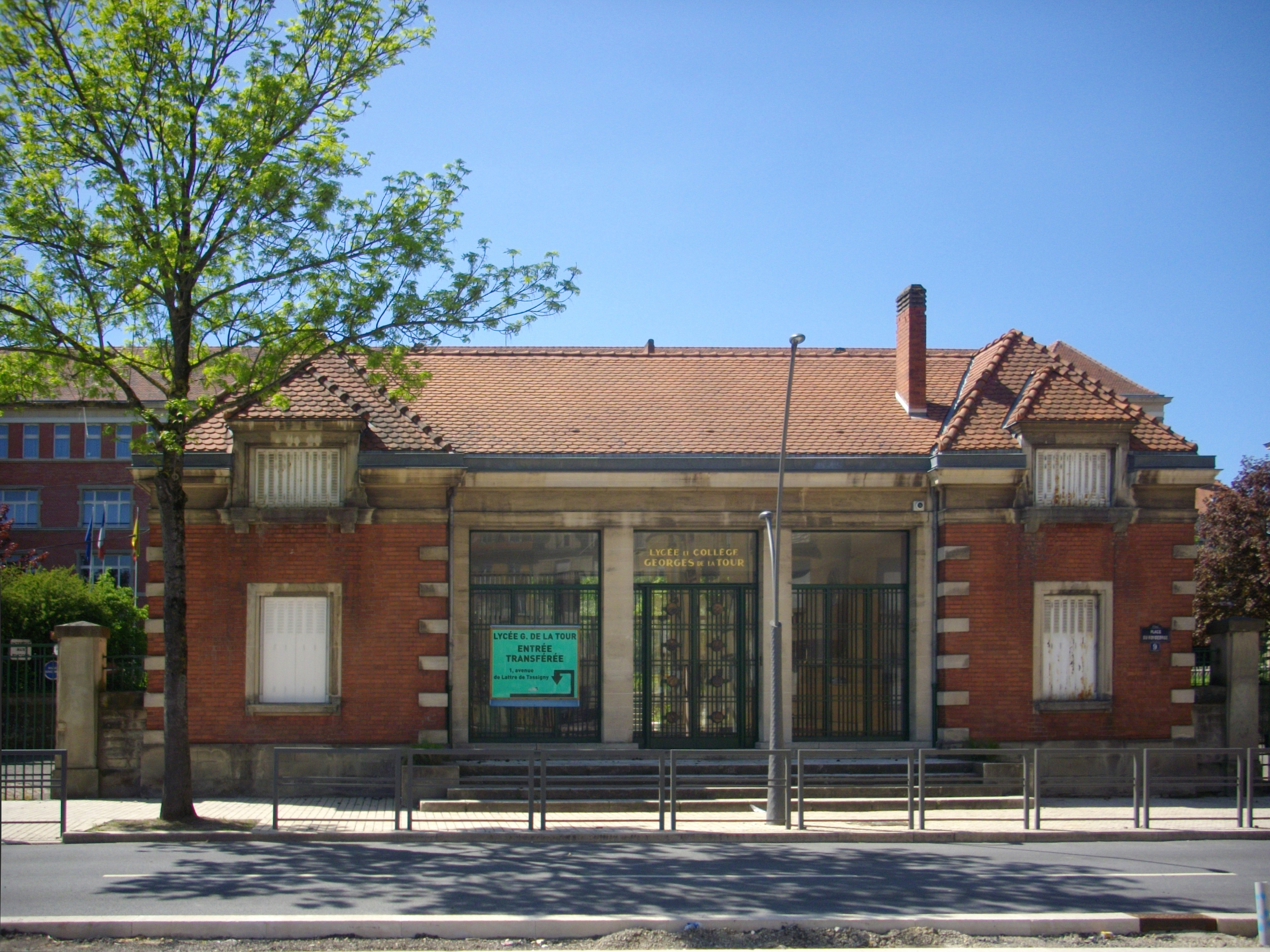
Entrance off of the Place du Roi-George to the Lycée and Collège Georges-de-la-Tour.

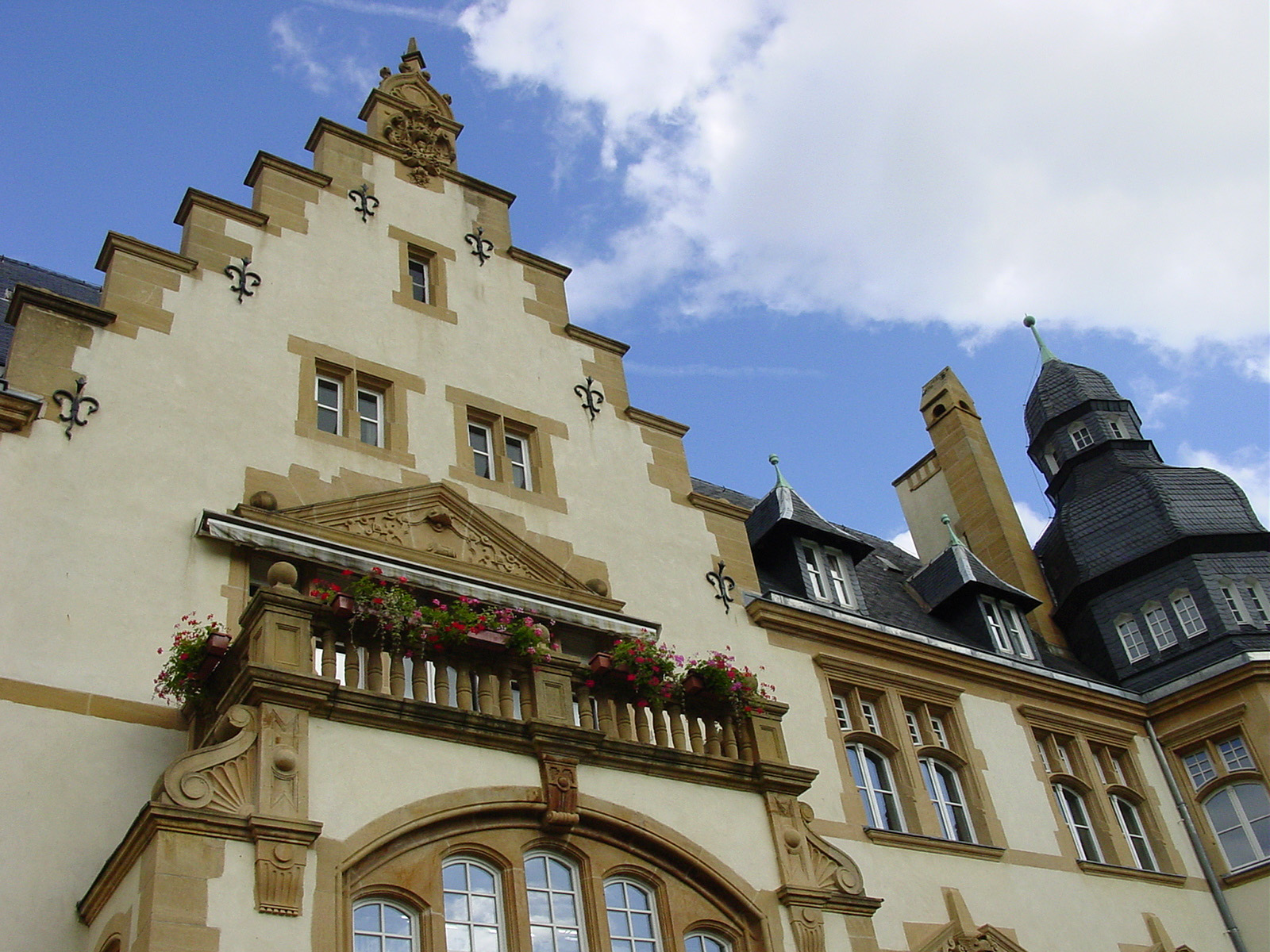
The façade and roofline of the Governor's Palace.

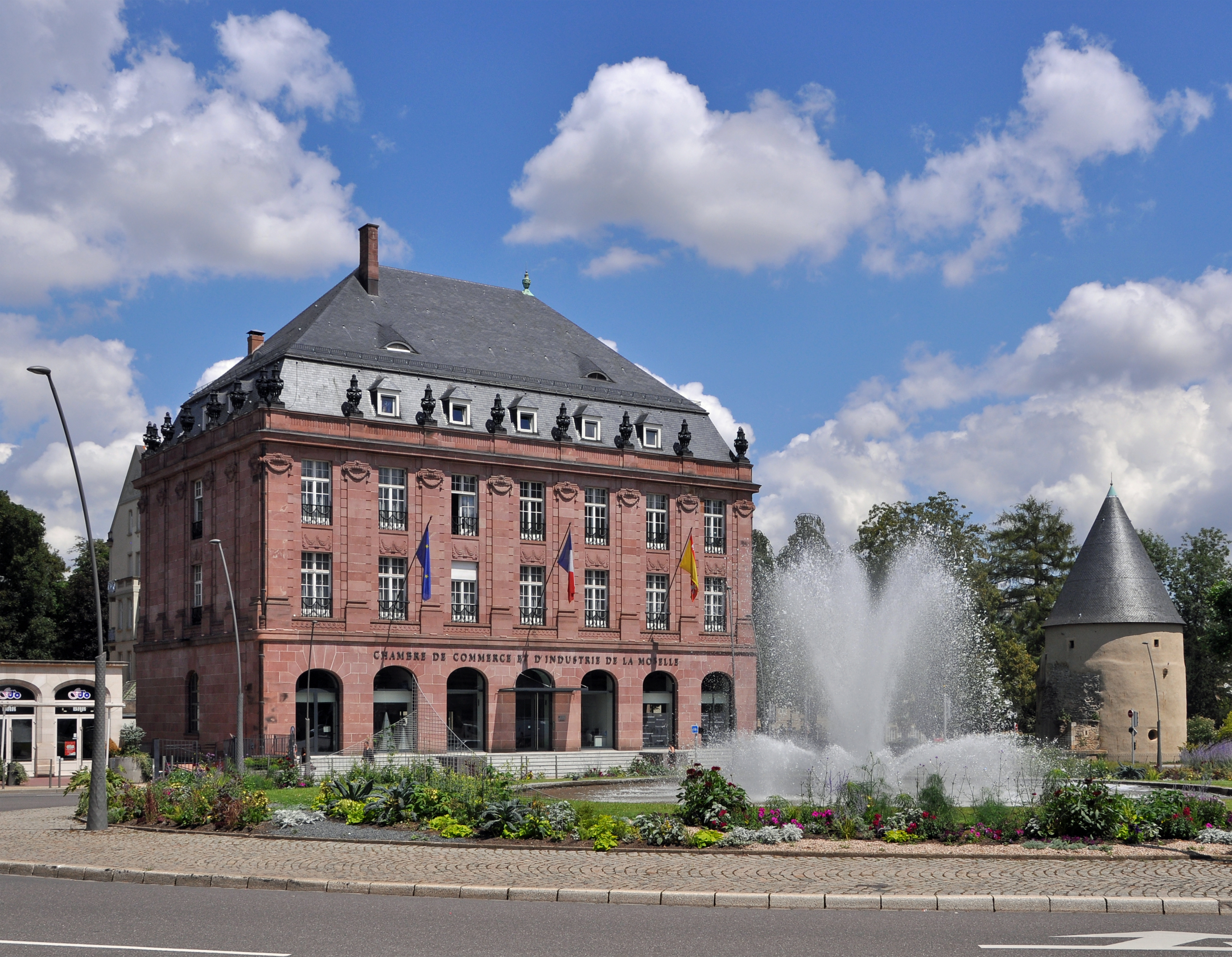
Chamber of Commerce and Industry of Moselle and the Tour Camoufle.

=== The Ring ===
Constructed in the wake of the demolition of the old city walls in 1902, the urban Ring of Metz begins at the Boulevard Paixhans/Boulevard du Pontiffroy, to the north of the historic city center, and enters the Imperial Quarter via the Avenue Jean XXIII and the Place Mazelle. Its southern side is dominated by the rail yards approaching the main railway station. Nearby here are situated:

- The Grand (Catholic) Seminary of Metz, dominated by its Chapel of St Charles Borromeo (1907)
- The railway station water tower (1908)

The avenue Foch, notable for its green space and central walking path, features several private mansions at its west entrance:

- Villa Bleyler (no. 14), Baroque-revival, punctuated by Art Nouveau, designed by Ludwig Becker, 1904–1906
- Villa Wildenberger (no. 16), Art Nouveau decoration, designed by Karl Griebel, 1903
- Villa Wahn (no. 18), Renaissance-revival, designed by Conrad Wahn, 1903
- Villa Linden (no. 20), Renaissance-revival, designed by Scheden, 1905
- Villa Burger, also known as Villa Salomon (no. 22) rural vernacular with wood paneling, designed by Eduard-Hermann Heppe, 1904
- Villa Lentz (no. 24), Neoclassical, designed by Jules-Geoffroy Berninger et Gustave Kraft, 1904

The avenue also includes some other impressive buildings:

- The Hôtel Royal, Rhenish-Renaissance-revival, 1905
- The Hôtel des Mines, also called the Hôtel Terminus, Renaissance-revival, 1906
- The General Treasury of Moselle, formerly the Bank of Luxembourg, Neoclassical

The Place Raymond-Mondon, built when the Imperial Quarter was laid out in 1902, was formerly the Place Impériale. In its center was an equestrian statue of Friedrich III of Germany, which the citizens of Metz toppled and destroyed in 1918. Around it, one will find:

- The Hôtel Foch, Baroque Revival, 1907
- The Chamber of Commerce and Industry of Moselle, no. 10-12 Avenue Foch, also constructed in pink sandstone as the Imperial Bank, a symbol of financial power, designed by Robert Curjel and Karl Moser, 1907
- The Hôtel des Arts et Métiers, no. 1-3 Avenue Foch, Flemish Renaissance-revival structure also of pink sandstone, built as the Chamber of Commerce, a symbol of German corporatist power, designed by Gustave Oberthür and Ernst Priedat, 1909
- The Tour Camoufle, in its eponymous square on the Avenue Foch, one of the last vestiges of the medieval walls of the city

The Avenue Joffre shows much more sobriety with one side including German buildings that are relatively austere, facing a set of French Haussmannian structures on the other side, leading up to the spot where Wilhelm II wanted to erect his church. The part of the avenue adjacent to the demolished walls—those dating from the Renaissance to the north and those built by Marshal Sébastien Vauban during the reign of Louis XIV to the south—is today an access ramp for the autoroute A31. Formerly a tree-lined avenue, this highway is marked at the north by the presence of the Square Gallieni and the gardens of the Governor's Palace. There, overlooking the Place Raymond-Mondon, are:

- The Rhenish Bank, with minimalist/geometric decoration inspired by the Vienna Secession, 1907
- A heavily Neoclassical-inspired apartment block ("Revanchist Haussmanianism"), 1925

And along the highway:

- The military barracks Barbot and de Lattre de Tassigny, located on the site of Vauban's bastion of the 17th century, built 1890–93
- The Serpenoise Gate, a triumphal arch whose current form dates from 1903; it was reconstructed (from an earlier version) in 1852 and enlarged in 1892
- The Monument to the Fallen by Paul Niclausse, Art Deco, from 1935

=== Monuments and sites of interest ===
- Metz-Ville railway station (Gare de Metz), the water tower, and the passage to the Amphitheater, designed by Jürgen Kröger, 1905–08
- Main post office, designed by Kröger and Ludwig Bettcher, 1905–11
- Arcades of the rue Gambetta (along the Hôtel des Arts & Métiers) and the Crystal Palace (whose façade is hidden, however)
- Old Metz railway station, 1878, on the place du Roi-George (formerly the place de la Gare); it replaced the initial train station, built in 1852 and destroyed by fire in 1872)
- Art Deco building at the corner of the rues Henry-Maret and Pasteur
- The Beer Hall, 1906, at no. 1 avenue Leclerc-de-Hautecloque, built in a regionalist German style, and no. 3, a Gothic-revival building dedicated to wine
- The Kaiser Wilhelm House, on the rue Mozart, Baroque-revival, 1903
- The Salle Braun and the Foyer Mozart, formerly the Protestant publishing house, 1907
- The Hôpital Notre-Dame-de-Bon-Secours, 1914, before 1919 named the Hôpital Sainte-Marie
- The former ceramics shop and studio of Villeroy & Boch, Art Nouveau
- Villas along the boulevard Clemenceau

=== Educational facilities ===
The expansion of Metz during the period of German rule also prompted the construction of various other educational institutions across the city. The Germanization of the architecture of schools is evident in the old Ecole de la Place de la Grève de Metz (Sandplatzschule), today the Ecole de Saint-Eucaire; the Ecole communale des filles de la rue de Chèvre (Madchenschule in der Ziegenstrasse); at the Ecole de la rue Paixhans (Volksschule in der Paixhansstrasse); and even in the Ecole normale d'Instituteurs (Lehrerseminar), a teacher's college. Two such institutions specifically within the Imperial Quarter were built during this period:

- The Ecole supérieure de jeunes filles (Höhere Mädchenschule), on the Place de Maud'huy, now the lycée (high school) Georges-de-la-Tour, built 1906–10 and enlarged in 1930
- The Ecole pratique supérieure de Metz (Oberrealschule), today the lycée Louis-Vincent, built 1913–16 with an expansion in 1933

More recently, the campus complex Georges-de-la-Tour—comprising both a collège (middle school), and the lycée (high school), has enlarged the site at the Place de Maud'huy, formerly that of the Barbot military barracks.

=== Military installations ===
- The barracks of Prince Frederick Carl, 1890; later renamed de Lattre de Tassigny and Barbot, the latter now part of the George-de-la-Tour campus
- The Governor's Palace, 1902–05
- The General Staff's residence, the former Palais de l'Intendance, on the Boulevard Clemenceau, Baroque-revival

=== Religious buildings ===
- Chapel of St. Charles Borromeo, at the Main Seminary, 1907–08
- Church of St. Therese of the Infant Jesus, 1954

=== Plazas, gardens, and green spaces ===
- Place Raymond-Mondon
- Place du Général-Mangin
- Place du Général-de-Gaulle
- Place du Roi-George
- Allée verte de l'Avenue Foch
- Jardin des Cinq Sens (in the Main Seminary)
- Place Saint-Thiébault
- Square Camoufle
- Square Gallieni
- Square Giraud and the gardens of the Governor's Palace
- Place de Maud'huy
- Square Jean-Pierre-Jean

== See also ==
- Media related to Quartier impérial at Wikimedia Commons
  - Media related to Avenue Foch at Wikimedia Commons
  - Media related to Gare de Metz at Wikimedia Commons
  - Media related to Boulevard Paixhans at Wikimedia Commons
