= Julian Swann =

British historian and academic

Julian Swann FRHS is a British historian and academic, a professor of early modern history at Birkbeck, University of London, where he has taught since 1989. Swann specialises in early modern French and European history.

== Writing ==
Swann has written several books about the French monarchy and politics, including Politics and the Parlement of Paris, 1754–1774 (Cambridge, 1995), Provincial Power and Absolute Monarchy. The Estates General of Burgundy, 1661–1790 (Cambridge, 2003) and The Crisis of the Absolute Monarchy: France From Old Regime to Revolution (Oxford, 2013), co-edited with Joël Félix. Politics and the Parlement of Paris, 1754–1774 pays particular attention to the government of Louis XV and how parlement and the monarchy interacted during the 1771 revolution.

== Memberships ==
Swann is a fellow of both the Royal Historical Society and Historical Association.

== Honours ==
Swann is a chevalier (knight) of the Ordre des Palmes Académiques (Order of Academic Palms), France.
