= François Marie Peyrenc de Moras =

French politician (1718–1771)

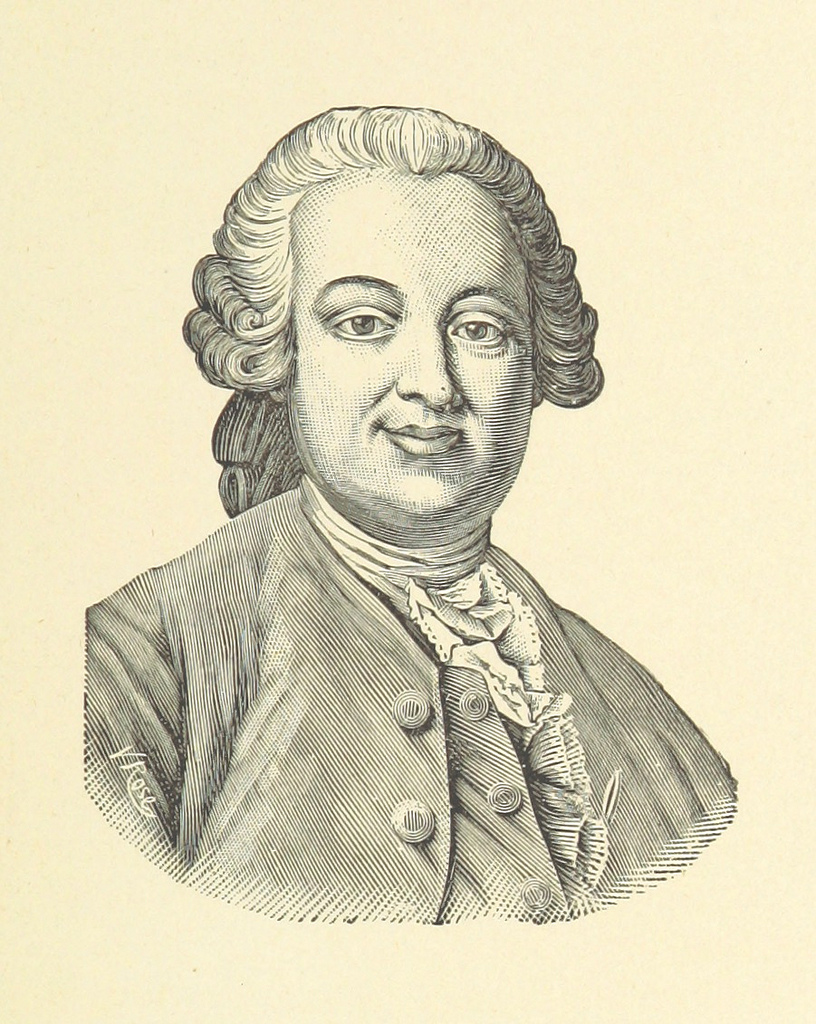
François Marie Peyrenc de Moras

François Marie Peyrenc de Moras (11 August 1718 – 3 May 1771) was a senior French politician.

In a family from the Cévennes, he was the son of Abraham Peyrenc de Moras (1686–1732), son of barber enriched in the system of Law, who built the Hôtel Biron (which since 1919 has housed the Musée Rodin), rue de Varenne in Paris and his wife, Anne-Marie-Josephe de Farges (1699–1738). He married Catherine Moreau Sechelles. Like his father, he is lord of Ambert, in Arlanc of Boutonnargues, Riols and Saint-Amand Roche Savine.

Francois Marie Peyrenc Moras is steward of Riom in 1750 to 1752, and the intendant of Hainaut Valenciennes from 1752 to 1754.

He was appointed Controller General of Finance on 24 April 1756 in place of his stepfather, John Moreau Sechelles.

In the early days of the Seven Years' War, 1 February 1757, to the disgrace of Jean-Baptiste de Machault d'Arnouville, he became Secretary of State for the Navy while retaining overall control of finances until 25 August 1757. Not wishing to juggle two key departments, he stepped down in favor of John Boullongne, as superintendent of finance. He was appointed Minister of State February 8, 1757. He maintained the Navy until 31 May 1758.

He retired to his castle of Grosbois, bought on 31 July 1762 from the heirs of Germain Louis Chauvelin.

Political offices
Preceded by Jean Moreau de Séchelles	Controllers-General of Finances; 24 April 1756 – 25 August 1757	Succeeded by Jean de Boullonges
Preceded by Jean Baptiste de Machault D'Arnouville	Secretaries of State for the Navy; 1 February 1757 – 31 May 1758	Succeeded by Claude Louis d'Espinchal, marquis de Massiac
