= Étienne de Silhouette =

French politician (1709–1767)

Controller-General of Finances of France
- In office 4 March 1759 – 21 November 1759
- Monarch: Louis XV
- Preceded by: Jean de Boullonges
- Succeeded by: Henri Bertin

Personal details
- Born: 5 July 1709 Limoges, Limousin (province), France
- Died: 20 January 1767 (aged 57) Bry-sur-Marne, France

Emblem of the Knights of Malta

Étienne de Silhouette (5 July 1709 – 20 January 1767) was a French Ancien Régime Controller-General of Finances under Louis XV.

== Life ==
Sometimes said to be akin to the next Niccolò Machiavelli, he was born at Limoges where his father Chevalier Arnaud de Silhouette, of Biarritz or de Zulueta (in Basque), had been posted as a Bourbon administrator. De Silhouette studied finance and economics assiduously and spent a year in London learning about the economy of Britain.

He translated into French several works by Alexander Pope, Henry Bolingbroke, William Warburton's The Alliance between Church and State, (1736) as Dissertations sur l'Union de la Religion, de la Morale, et de la Politique (1742) and Baltasar Gracián's El político. The Prince of Condé's party later used his translations from English to criticize him, but Madame de Pompadour's support and vision saw him awarded with the position of Controller-General on 4 March 1759; this was one of the most extensive administrative positions in the Ancien Régime, albeit a very unstable one. His task was to curb France's spiralling deficit and strengthen the finances for the Seven Years' War against Britain (1754–1763). Public opinion preferred his 72-million-livres public loan to the ferme générale, an outsourced tax collection system. He managed to curtail Royal household expenditure, revised state pensions and to encourage free trade he reduced some ancient taxes whilst establishing new ones in accordance with the vision of a unified French market.

De Silhouette forecast a bleak budget for 1760: income of 286 million livres compared to expenses of 503 million livres, including at least 94 million in debt service. In an attempt to restore the kingdom's finances by the English method of taxing the rich and privileged (nobility and church were exempt from taxes in the Ancien Régime), de Silhouette devised the "general subvention," i.e., taxes on external signs of wealth (doors and windows, farms, luxury goods, servants, profits). On 26 October, he took the war measure of ordering the melting down of goldware and silverware. He was criticized by the nobility including Voltaire, who thought his measures, though theoretically beneficial, were not suitable for wartime and the French political situation.

On 20 November 1759, after eight months in the position, he left the court and retired to Bry-sur-Marne, where he set about improving the budget. After his death in 1767, his nephew and heir Clément de Laage completed his work.

== The Silhouette legacy ==
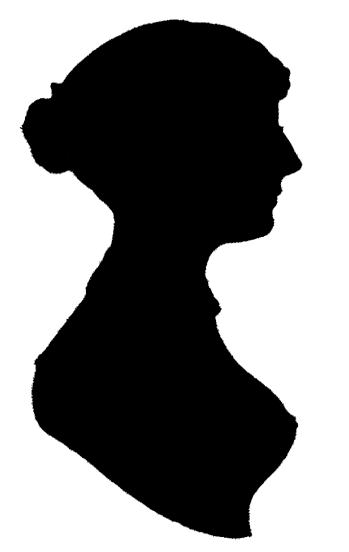
Silhouette of Jane Austen.

Despite Étienne de Silhouette's short tenure as Treasury Chief, it caused him to become the subject of hostility. His penny-pinching manner led the term à la Silhouette to be applied to things perceived as cheap or austere.

During this period an art form of growing popularity was a shadow profile cut from black paper. It provided a simple and inexpensive alternative for those who could not afford more decorative and expensive forms of portraiture, such as painting or sculpture. Those who considered it cheap attached the word "silhouette" to it. This art-form is still practiced and named silhouette cutting, or art, to this day.

Despite his name being applied to the silhouette art form, Étienne de Silhouette ironically has no portraits in existence, not even a silhouette. Although several portraits were created depicting Silhouette, all were oil paintings destroyed during the French Revolution.

== See also ==
- France in the Seven Years' War
- List of Ambassadors of France to Great Britain

== Sources ==
- The corresponding page at the French Wikipedia.
- extract from the Dictionnaire des surintendants et contrôleurs généraux des finances, Françoise Bayard, Joël Felix, Philippe Hamon, ISBN 2-11-090091-1
