= Joel Felix =

Joel Felix may refer to:

- Joel Felix (historian)
- Joel Felix (footballer)
