= Faubourg Saint-Germain =

Historic district in Paris, once known for attracting French nobility

Coordinates: 48.8580°N 2.3200°E

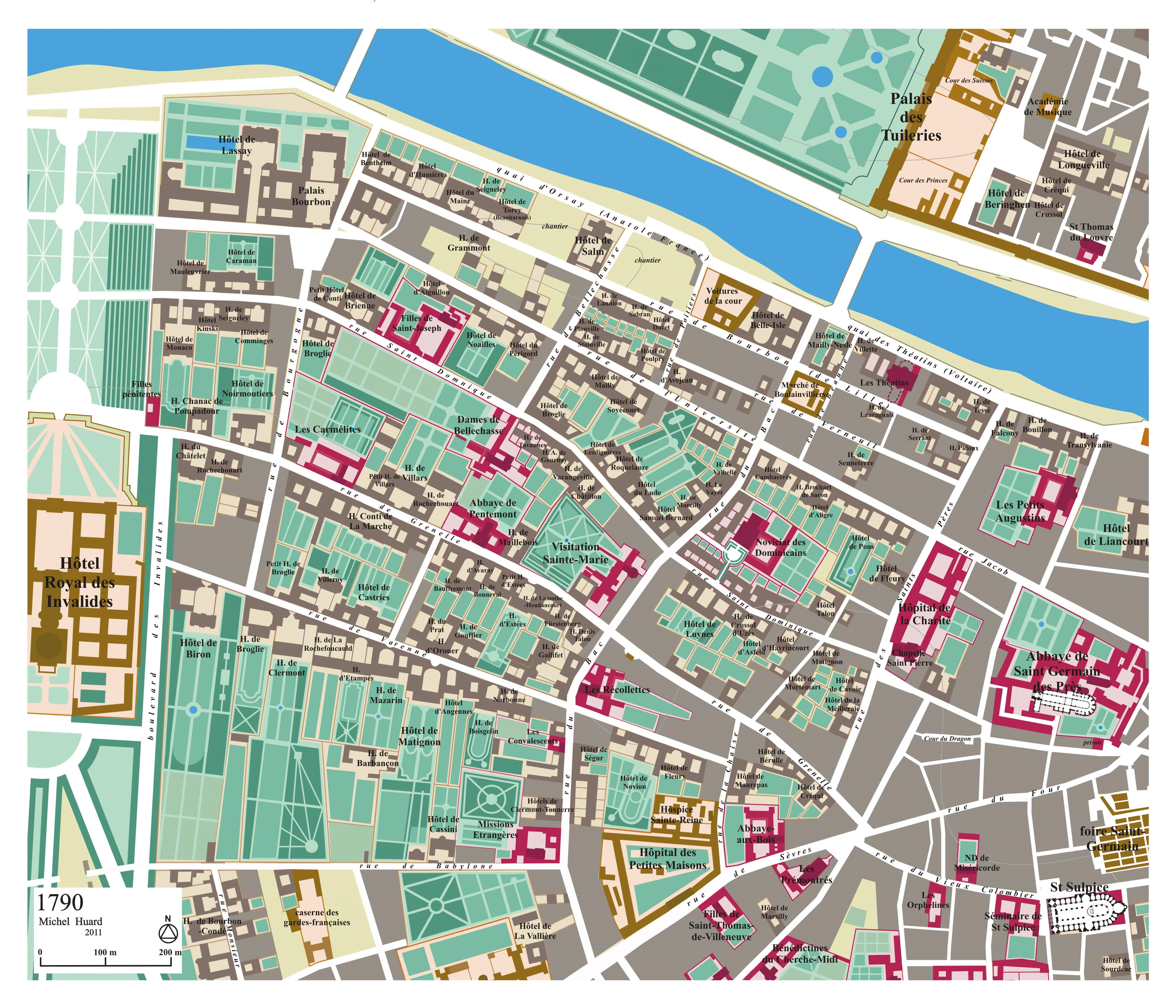
Faubourg Saint-Germain in 1790

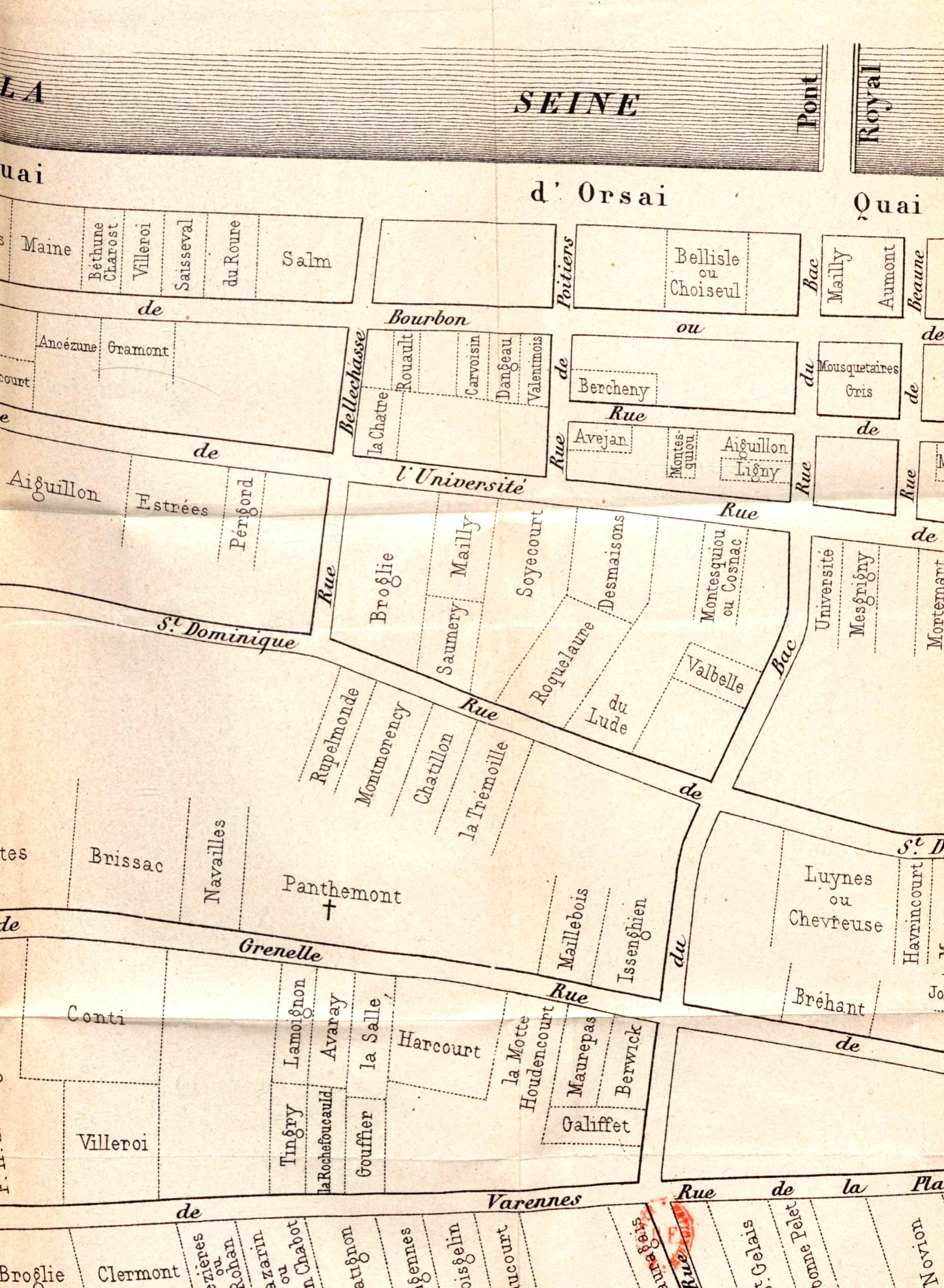
Map of various hôtels particuliers

The Faubourg Saint-Germain (French pronunciation: [fobuʁ sɛ̃ ʒɛʁmɛ̃]) is a historic district of Paris's Rive Gauche, France. The Faubourg has long been known as the favourite home of the French high nobility and hosts many aristocratic hôtels particuliers. It is currently part of the 7th arrondissement.

== History ==
=== Early royal history ===
In its early history, the Faubourg Saint-Germain was an agricultural suburb of Paris, lying west of the historical Saint-Germain-des-Prés urban district.

In 1670, Louis XIV began to build a grandiose hospital and retirement home for aged and unwell soldiers: the Invalides. The king chose a site at the western end of the Faubourg and commissioned architect Libéral Bruant. The enlarged project was completed in 1676. Stretching 196 metres along the Seine River, the complex had 15 courtyards, the largest being the cour d'honneur ("court of honour") for military parades. Jules Hardouin Mansart assisted the aged Bruant, and the chapel was finished in 1679 to Bruant's designs after the elder architect's death. The construction of the Invalides opened a new district to urbanizing, offering large empty spaces between the new monument and the old city limit.

During the 18th century, French high nobility started to move from the central Marais, the then-aristocratic district of Paris where nobles used to build their urban mansions (see Hotel de Soubise) to the clearer, less populated and less polluted Faubourg Saint-Germain that soon became the new residence of French highest nobility. The district became so fashionable within the French aristocracy that the phrase le Faubourg has been used to describe French nobility ever since. The oldest and most prestigious families of the French nobility built residences in the area, such as the Hôtel Matignon, the Hôtel de Salm or the Hôtel Biron.

=== The French Revolution ===
Riots that occurred on September 14, 1788, instigated by the retirement of the publicly-hated, royalist minister Guillaume-Chrétien de Lamoignon de Malesherbes, resulted in troops being called into Faubourg Saint-Germain, and, according to Peter Kropotkin, "in the Rue Mélée and the Rue de Grenelle there was a horrible slaughter of poor folk who could not defend themselves."

During the French Revolution, many of these mansions, offering large reception rooms and exquisite decoration, were confiscated and turned into national institutions. The French expression "les ors de la Republique" (literally, "the golds of the Republic"), referring to the luxurious environment of the national palaces (official residences and institutions), comes from that time. One of the few hôtels particuliers that was not confiscated was the Hôtel de Besenval, as it belonged to Pierre Victor, Baron de Besenval de Brunstatt, a Swiss military officer in French service.

=== The Restorations ===
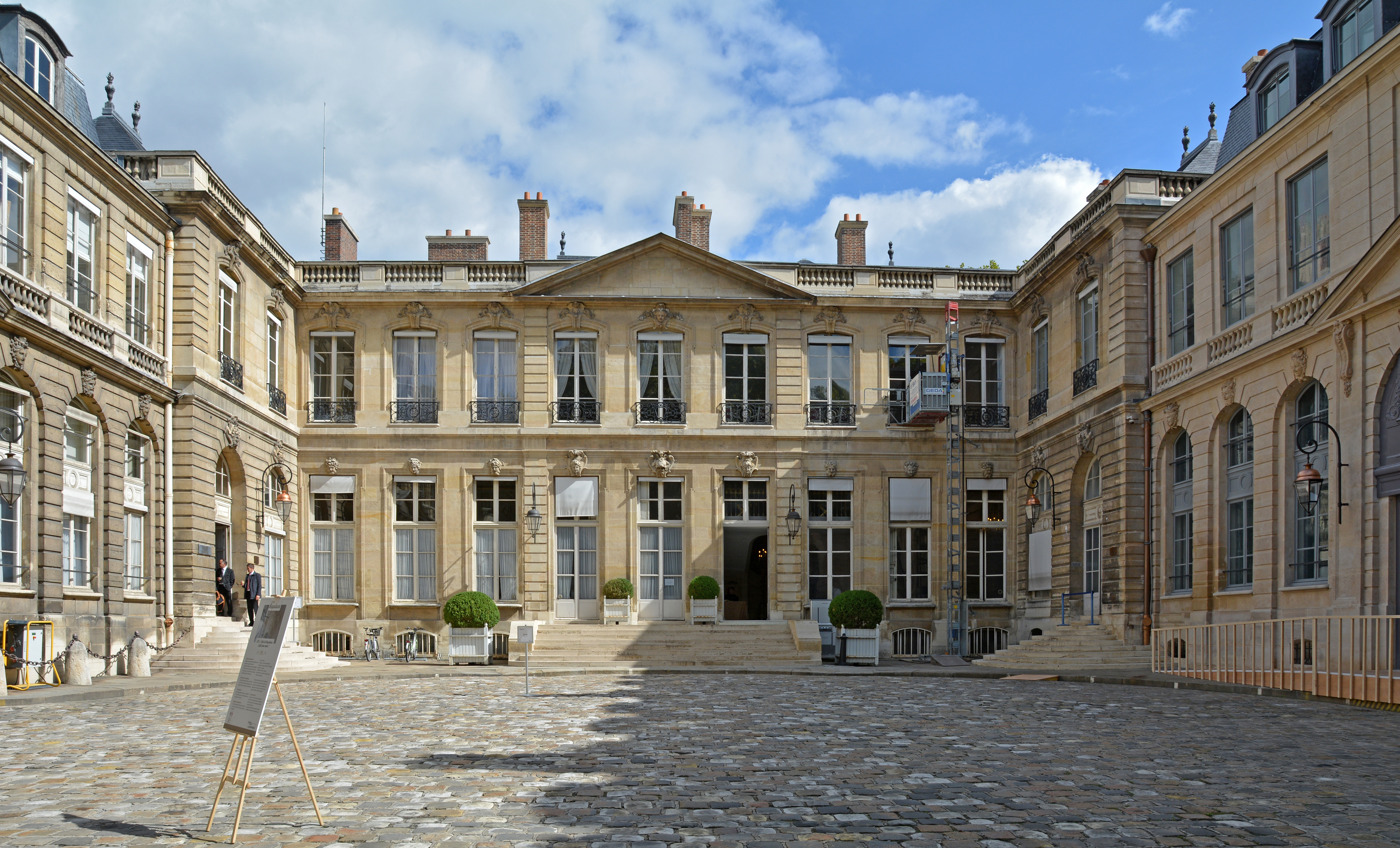
Hôtel de Roquelaure, 246 Boulevard Saint-Germain

During the restoration of the Bourbon dynasty, the Faubourg recovered its past glory as the most exclusive high nobility district of Paris. Moreover, as home to the Ultra-royalist Party, it was the political center of the country. The Ultra pushed towards counter-revolutionary laws, reinforcing the Catholic Church's power (Anti-Sacrilege Act) and enacting the Loi du milliard aux émigrés (literally, the "Law of the Billion to the Emigrants" [meaning "Exiles"]), which allowed the French nobility to return from exile and compensated them for their loss of fortune and land in the Revolution.

However, after the fall of Charles X in 1830 during the July Revolution, the district lost most of its political influence. During the July Monarchy, from 1830 to 1848, when the junior Orleanist branch held the throne, the Faubourg was politically marginalized, many noble families withdrawing from active participation in political life to their châteaux in the countryside and their hôtels particuliers in Paris, urban mansions in the Faubourg and led a passive but brilliant social life.

"The world of the Faubourg Saint-Germain" of this era appears in Marcel Proust's epochal novel series In Search of Lost Time as "the world of Guermantes" – The Guermantes Way (Le Côté de Guermantes) is the title of the third volume. The figure of the Duchess of Guermantes is inspired by the real countess Élisabeth Greffulhe. Proust depicts this exclusive "world" in all its facets, as well as the (mostly futile) efforts of social climbers (like himself) to penetrate it. The Nouveau riche had no access to this society. The families of the Ancien Régime even looked down on the Nobility of the First French Empire, the Napoleonic nobility, in the period before the First World War.

Thereafter, the Faubourg remained the center of French upper class social life. Nowadays, the Faubourg – as with the rest of the 7th arrondissement – is still one of the most exclusive districts of Paris.

== Geography ==
The Faubourg Saint-Germain is the eastern part of the current 7th arrondissement, roughly the area between the Invalides, the 15th arrondissement and the 6th arrondissement's border. The neighborhood is more precisely bounded by the Seine River on the north, the Esplanade des Invalides/Boulevard des Invalides on the west, Rue de Babylone on the south, and the Boulevard Raspail and Boulevard Saint-Germain on the east.

== Gallery ==
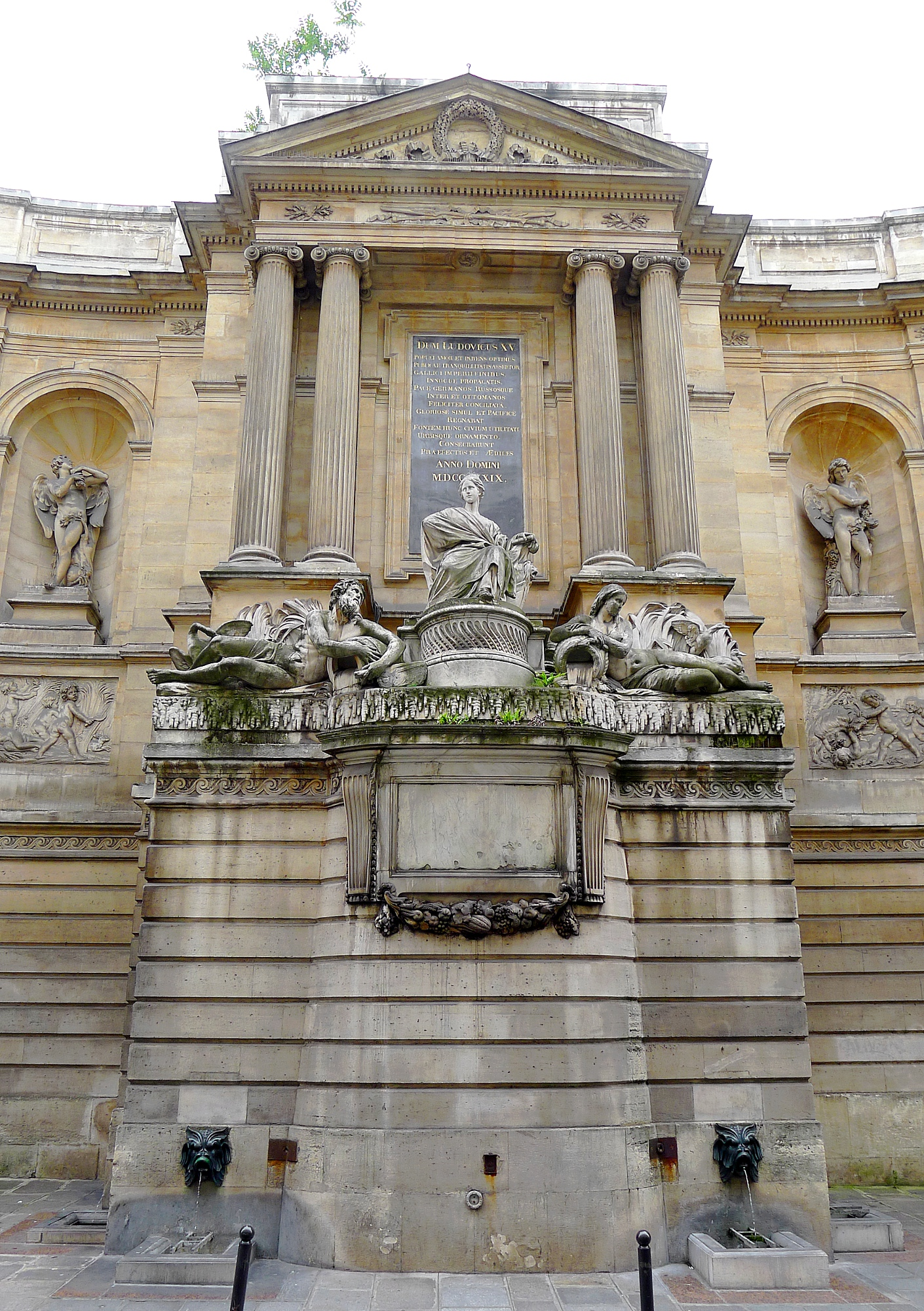
Fontaine des Quatre-Saisons

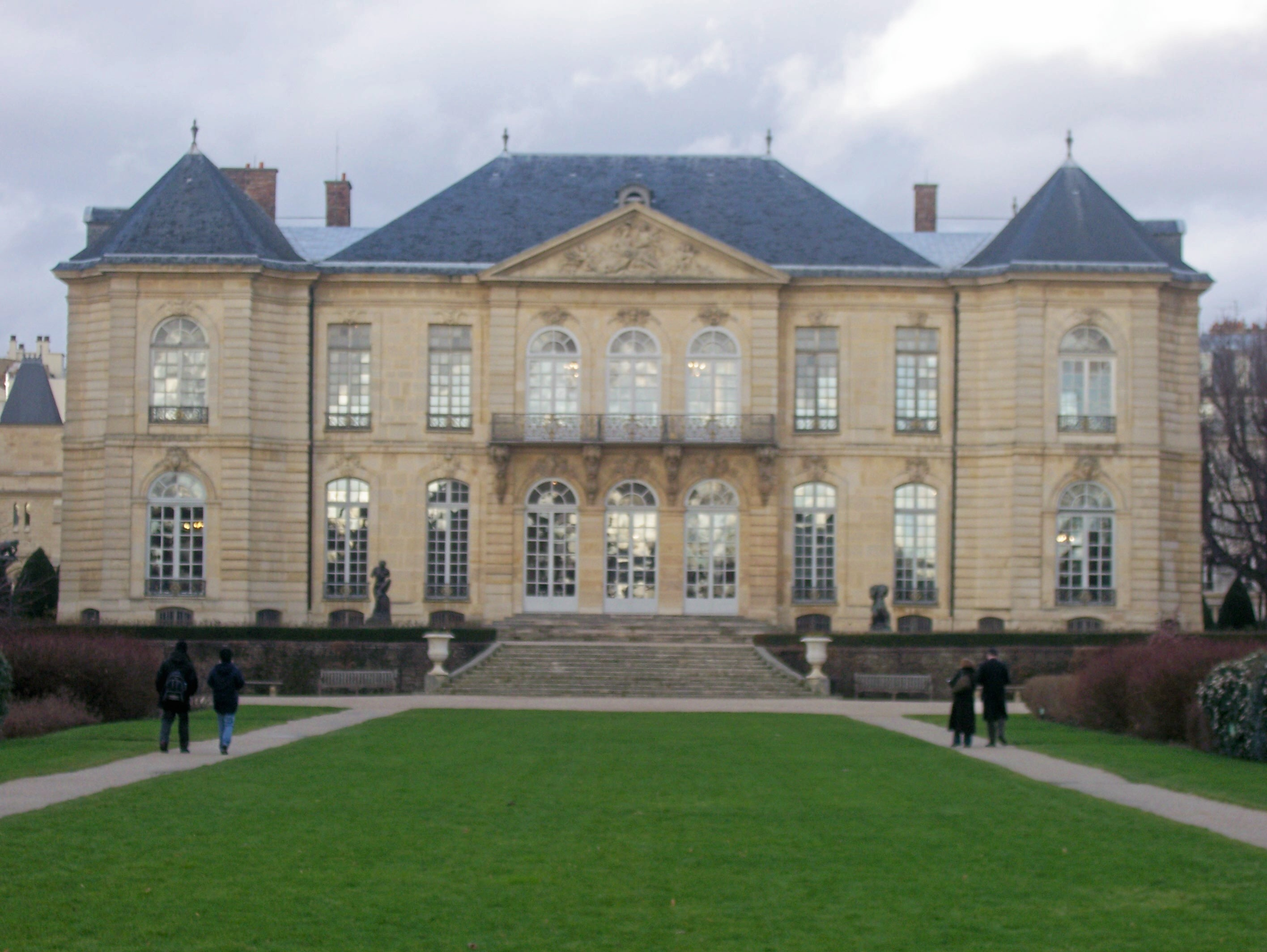
Hôtel Biron

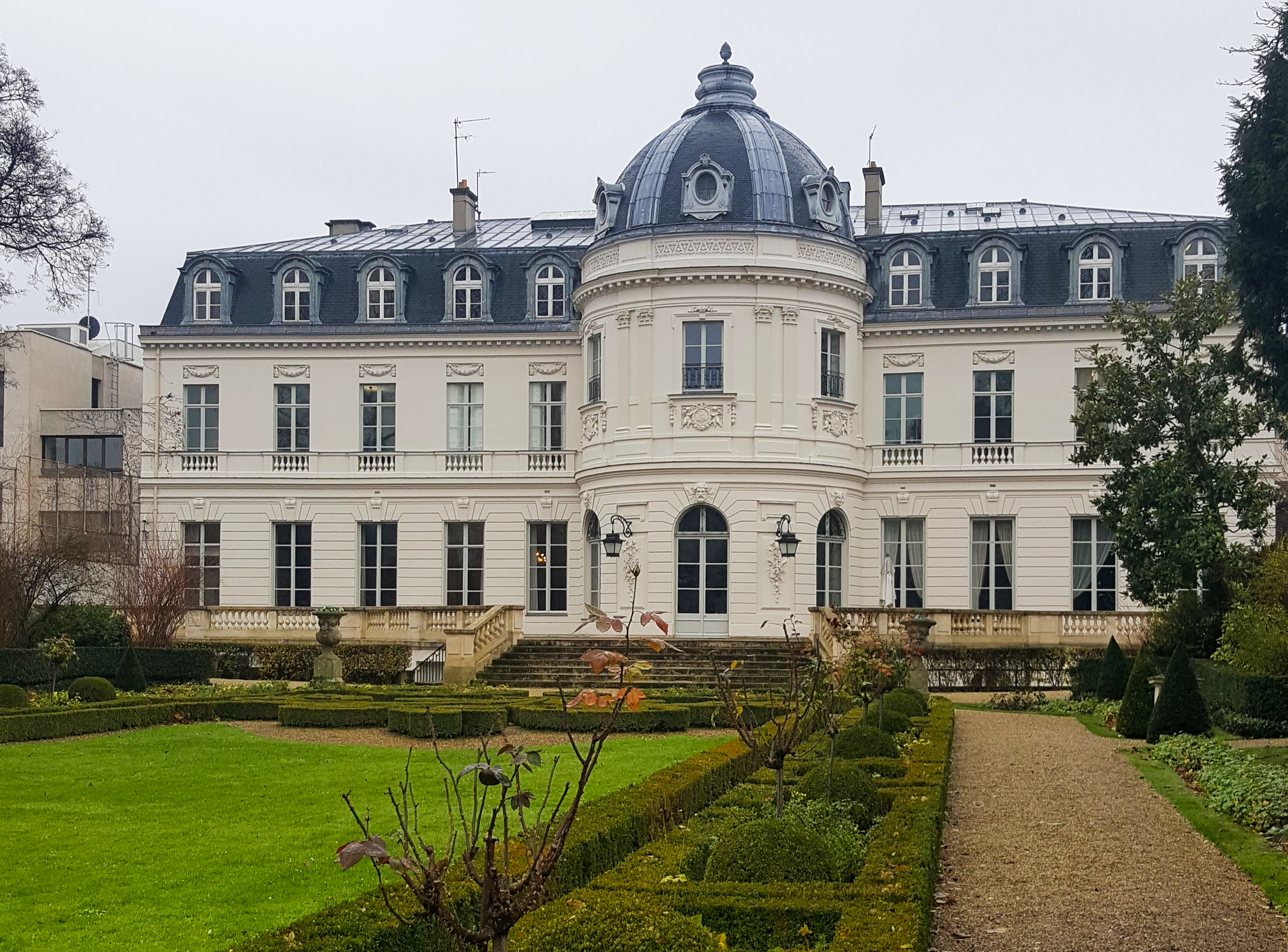
Hôtel de Cassini

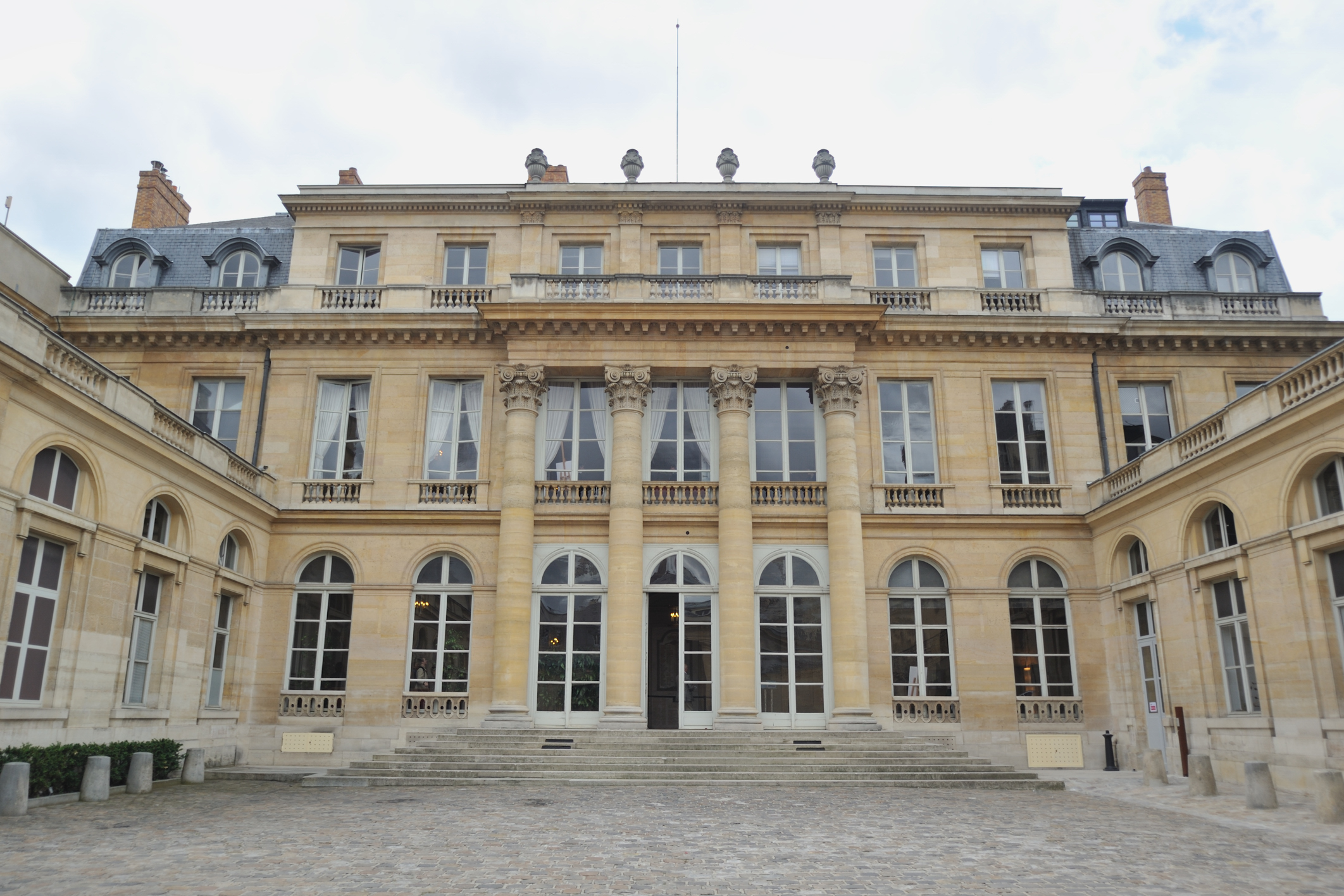
Hôtel du Châtelet

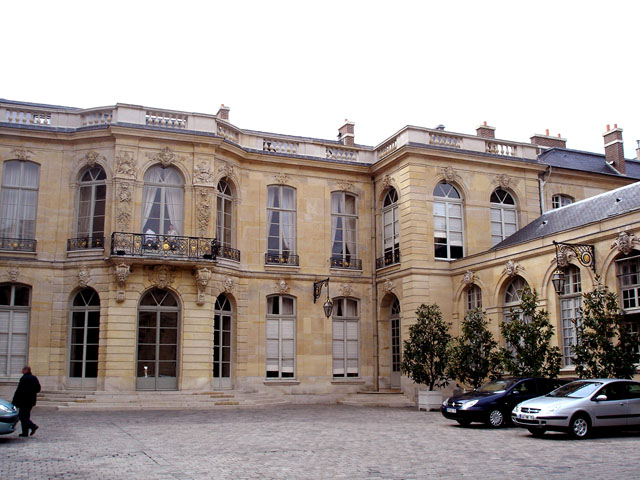
Hôtel Matignon

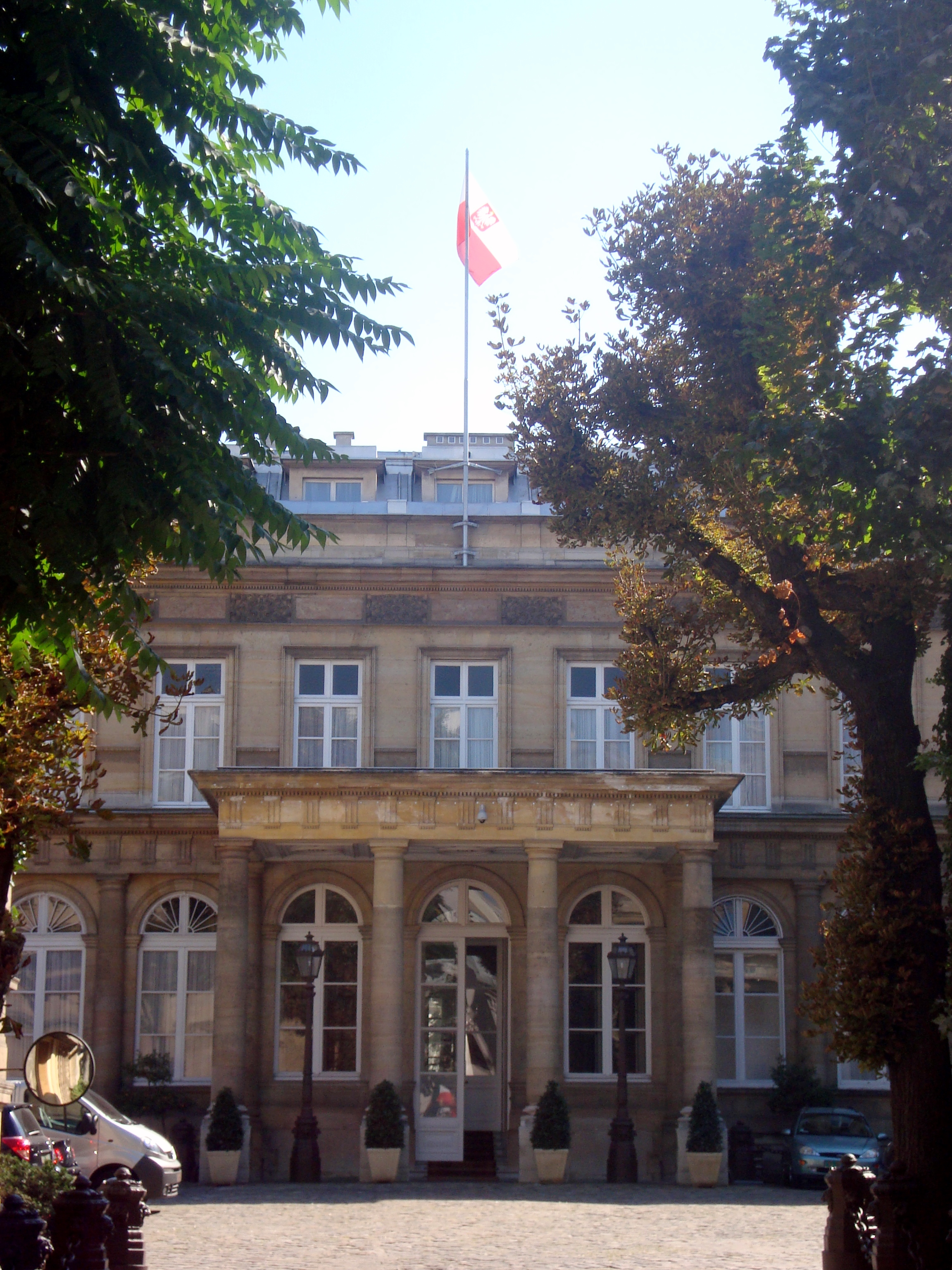
Hôtel de Monaco

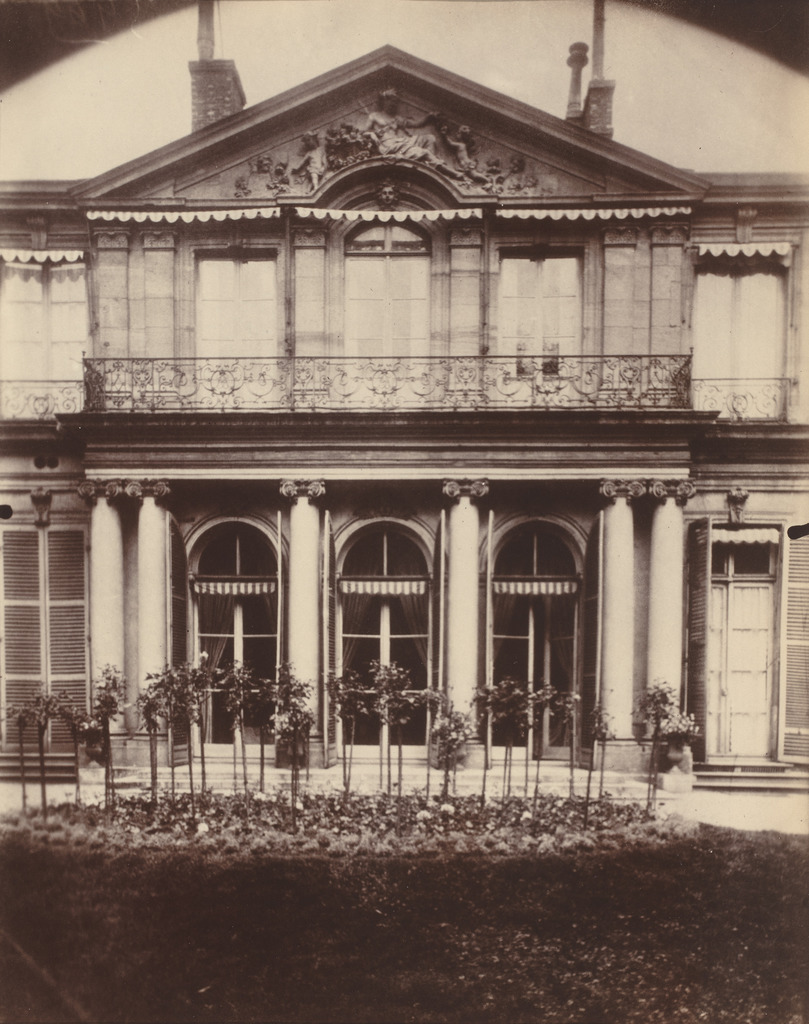
Hôtel de Rothelin-Charolais

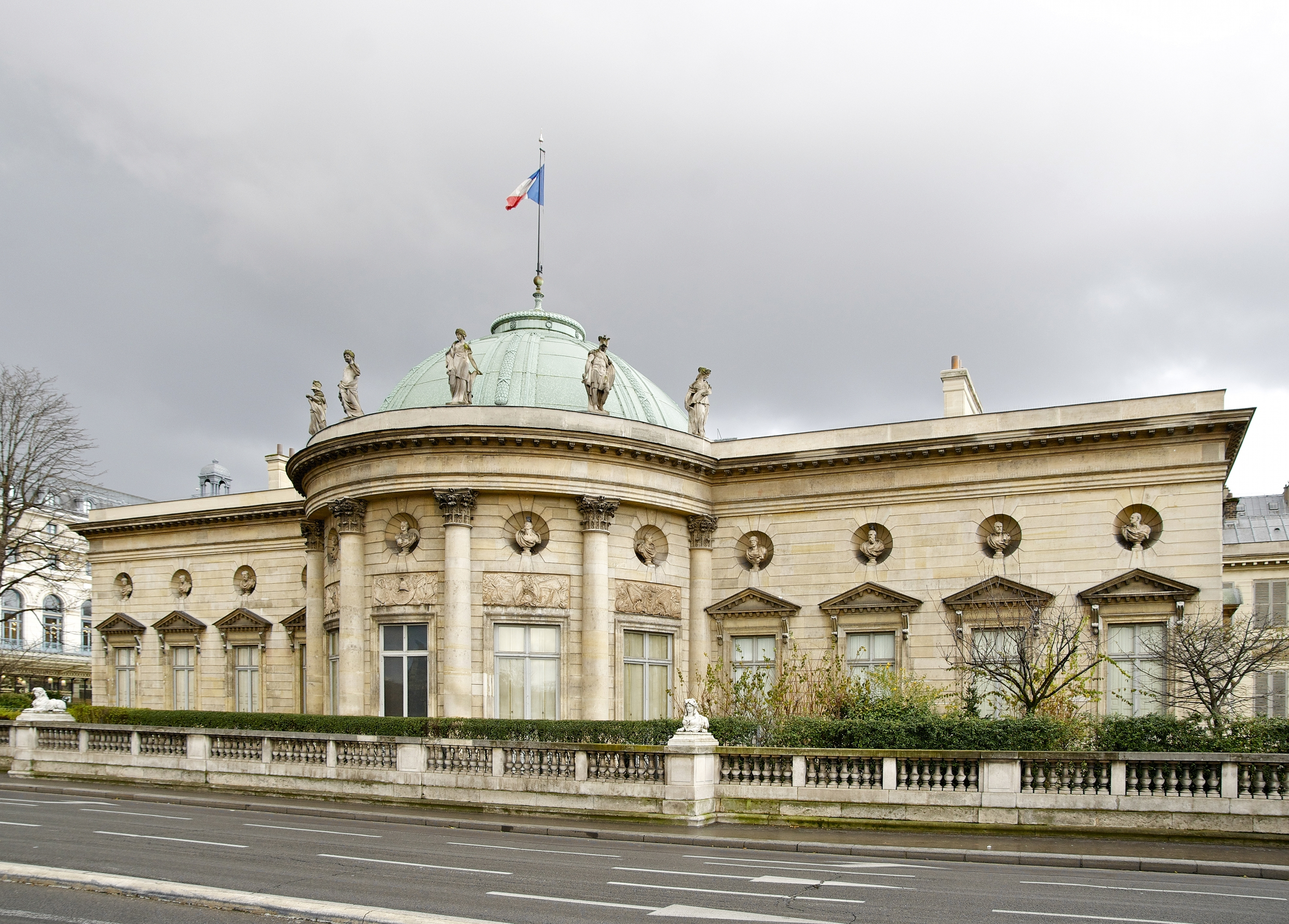
Hôtel de Salm

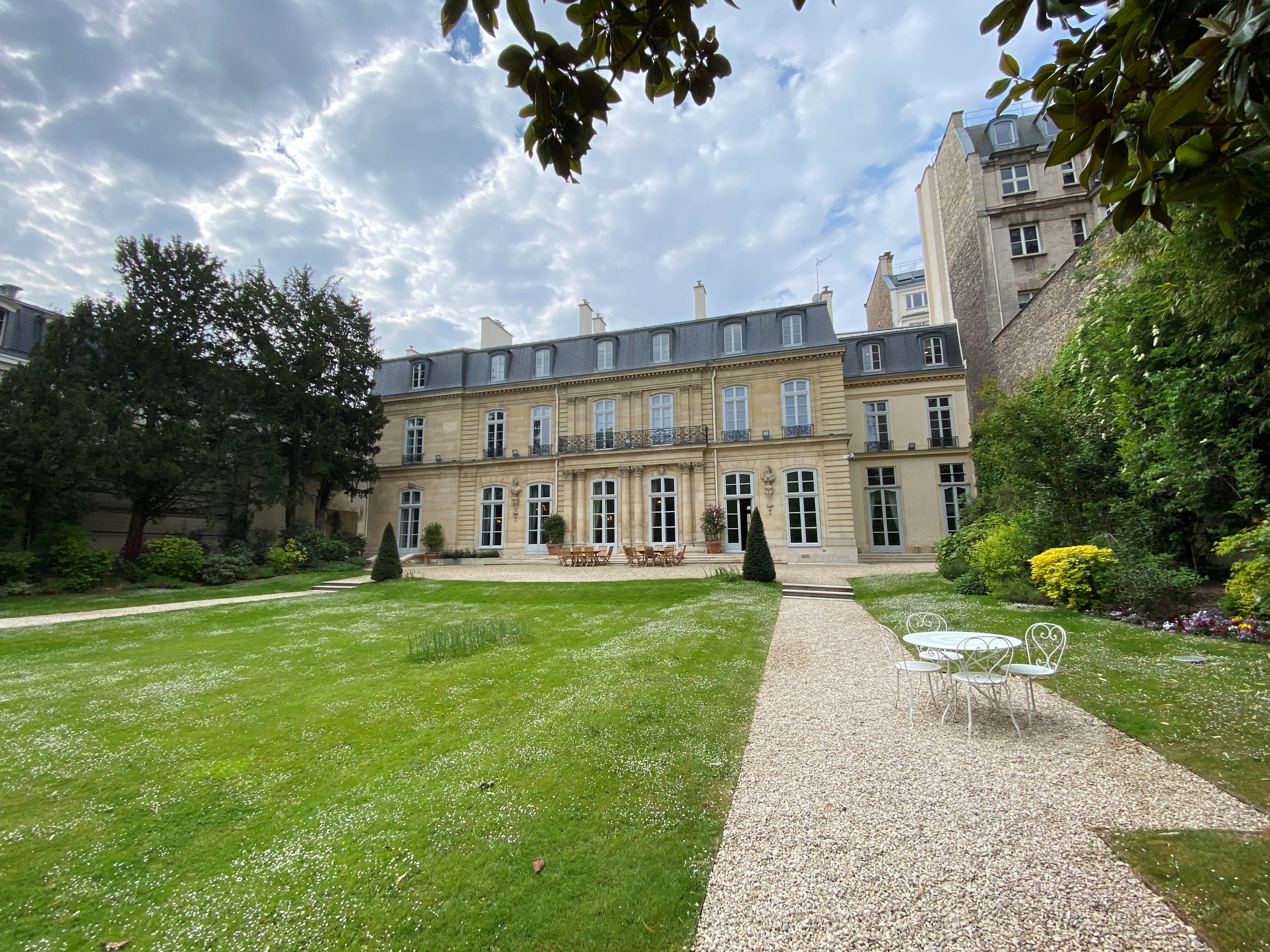
Hôtel de Besenval

== See also ==
- Île Saint-Louis
- Saint-Germain-des-Prés
