= Claude Louis d'Espinchal, marquis de Massiac =

French admiral and minister

Coat of arms of d'Espinchal de Massiac

Claude Louis d'Espinchal, marquis de Massiac (15 November 1686, Brest, Province of Brittany – 15 August 1770, Paris) was a French Admiral and Minister.

He was son of Barthélémy d'Espinchal de Massiac, 1626–1700, lawyer. Claude-Louis-René de Mordant, Marquis of Massiac (1746–1806), inherited his fortune including sugar plantations in Santo Domingo. He held the Club de l'hôtel de Massiac at the Hotel de Massiac, which opposed the Society of the Friends of the Blacks.

Political offices
Preceded by François Marie Peyrenc de Moras	Secretaries of State for the Navy; 31 May 1758 - 31 October 1758	Succeeded by Nicolas René Berryer
