= Jean-Baptiste de Machault d'Arnouville =

French politician (1701–1794)

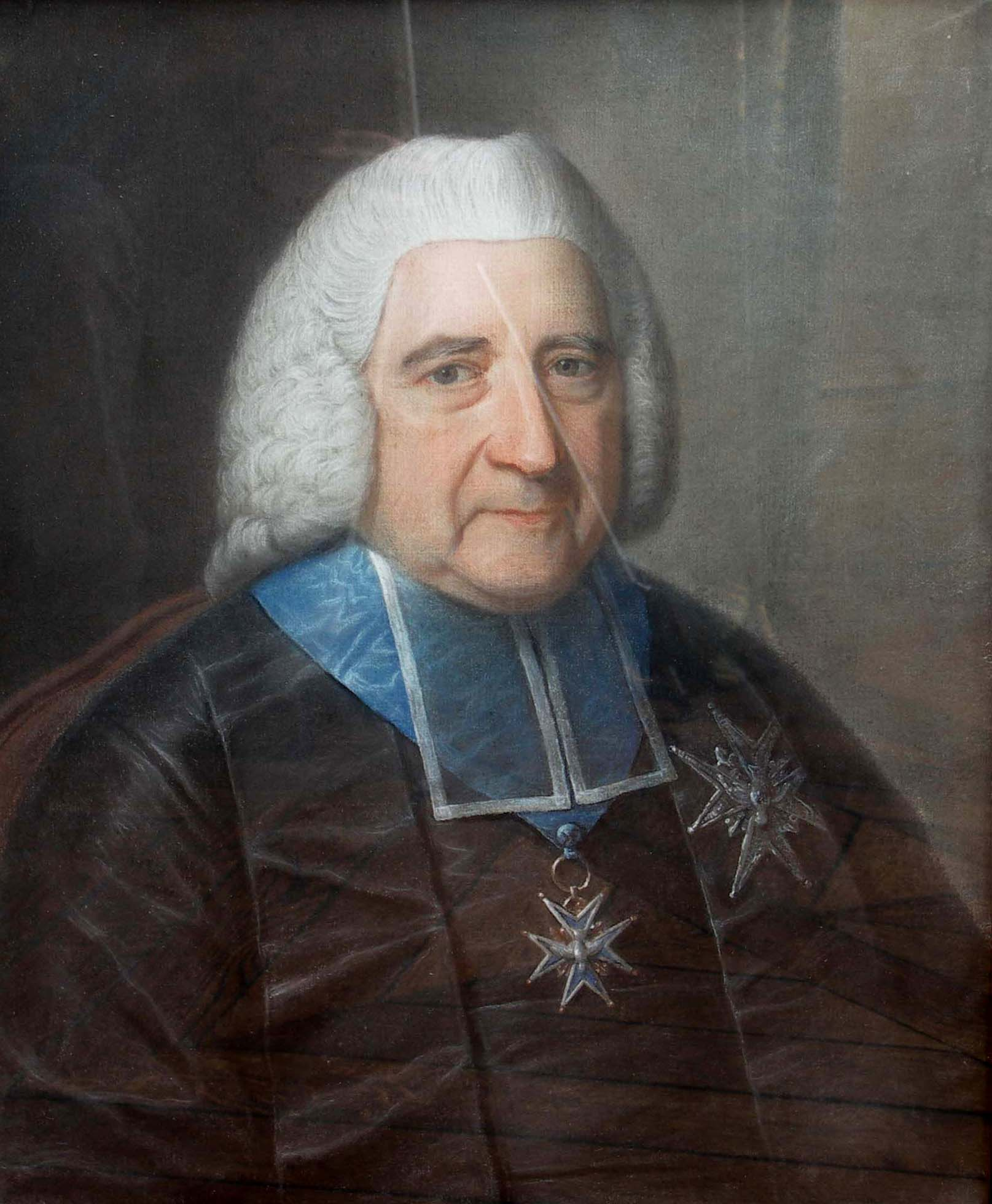
Jean-Baptiste de Machault d'Arnouville

Jean-Baptiste de Machault, comte d'Arnouville, seigneur de Garge et de Gonesse (Paris, 13 December 1701 – Paris, 12 July 1794), was a French statesman, son of Louis Charles Machault d'Arnouville and lieutenant of police.

In 1721, he was counsel to the Parlement of Paris; in 1728, he was maître des requêtes, and ten years later, he was made president of the Great Council although he had opposed the court in the Unigenitus dispute, he was appointed intendant of Hainaut in 1743. From this position, through the influence at court of his old friend the marquis d'Argenson, he was called to succeed Philibert Orry as Controller-General of Finances in December 1745. On taking office, he found that in the four years of the War of the Austrian Succession the economies of Cardinal Fleury had been exhausted, and he was forced to develop the system of borrowing which was bringing French finances to the verge of bankruptcy.

In 1749, he attempted a reform in the levying of direct taxes, which, if carried out, would have done much to prevent the later Revolutionary movement. He proposed to abolish the old tax of a tenth or tithe (in French dîme), which was evaded by the clergy and most of the nobility, and substituted a tax of one-twentieth (in French "vingtième") that would have been levied on all. The inclusion of the church made this bill popular with the larger public, in addition to the Philosophes, the Jansenists, and the Gallicans. However, there were loud remonstrances from bishops (particularly Christophe de Beaumont, the Archbishop of Paris) and the Dévot party at Louis XV's court. The clergy stood by their historical privileges, and the outcry of the nobility was virulent, and the proposal was rejected. Despite this, Machault managed to retain his office until July 1754, when he exchanged the controllership for the Naval Ministry.

Foreseeing the disastrous results of the alliance with Austria, he was drawn to oppose more decidedly the schemes of Madame de Pompadour, whose personal ill-will he had gained. On 1 February 1757 Louis XV acquiesced in her demand for his removal. Machault retired to his estate at Arnouville until the Revolution broke out in 1789, when, after a period of hiding, he was apprehended in 1794 at Rouen and brought to Paris as a suspect. He was imprisoned in the Prison des Madelonnettes, where he died after a few weeks at the age of ninety-three.

== Family ==
His eldest son, Louis Charles de Machault d'Arnouville (1737–1820), was bishop of Amiens from 1774 until the Revolution. He was one of the most uncompromising conservatives at the Estates-General of 1789, where he voted consistently against every reform. He emigrated in 1791, which provoked the arrest of the members of his family still in France in 1793, when his father and his brothers Charles and Armand were arrested as parents and relatives of an émigré. Upon his return to France in 1802, he resigned his bishopric in order not to be an obstacle to Concordat of 1801, and he retired to the ancestral château of Arnouville, where he died in 1820.

Political offices
Preceded by Antoine Louis Rouillé	Secretaries of State for the Navy; 24 July 1754 – 1 February 1757	Succeeded by François Marie Peyrenc de Moras
