= Jean de Boullonges =

French politician

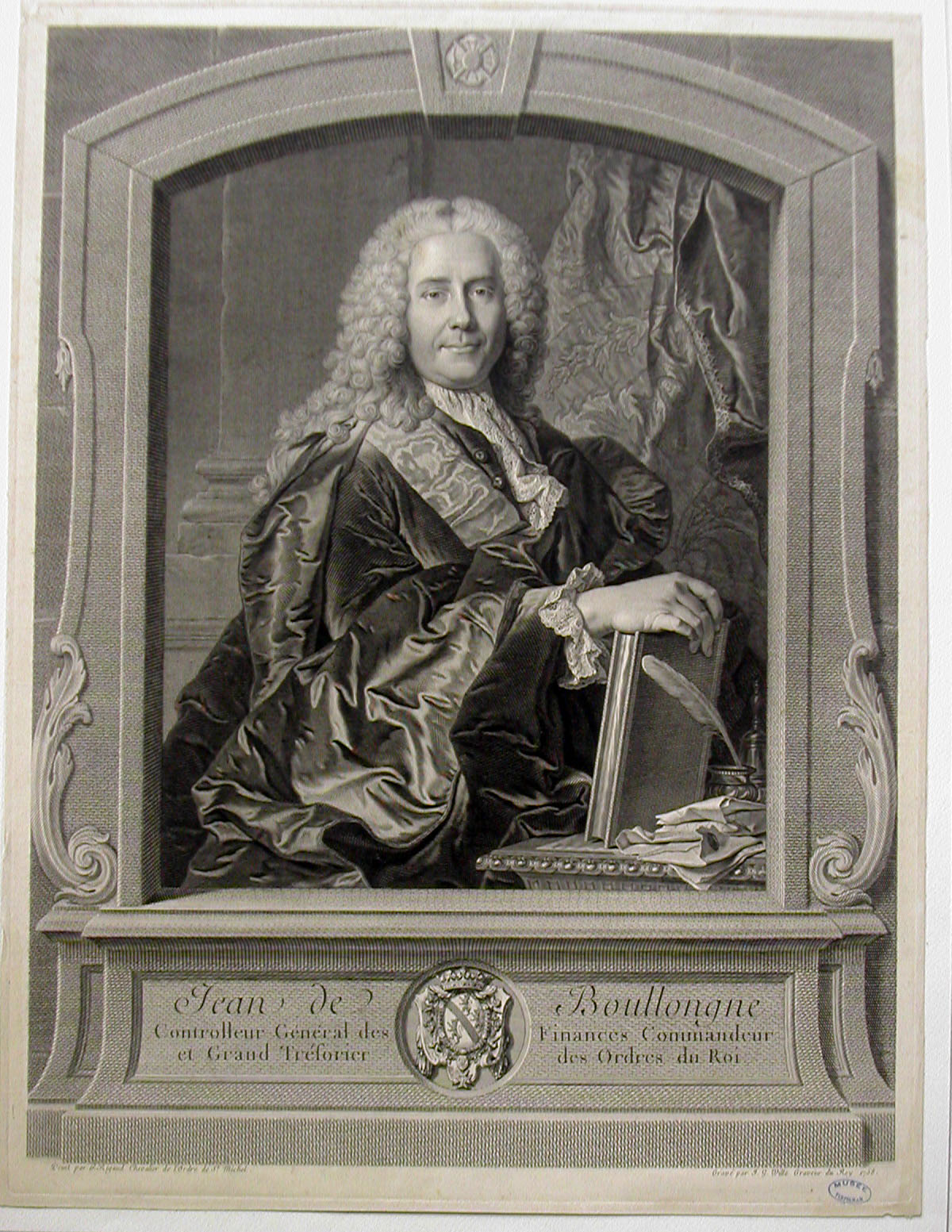
Jean de Boullongne by Wille after Hyacinthe Rigaud

John Boullongne, Count de Nogent (13 October 1690 in Paris – 22 February 1769) was a French magistrate and politician.

Adviser to the parliament of Metz in 1726, then intendent of finance in 1744, State Councilor, member of the Royal Council of Finance, he became controller general of finance on 25 August 1757, replacing François Marie Peyrenc de Moras. He remained in that position until 4 March 1759.

Political offices
Preceded by François Marie Peyrenc de Moras	Controllers-General of Finances; 25 August 1757 – 4 March 1759	Succeeded by Étienne de Silhouette
