= Jean Aubert (architect) =

French architect

Jean Aubert (French pronunciation: [ʒɑ̃ obɛʁ]; ca. 1680 – 13 October 1741) was a French architect, the most successful of the Régence and designer of two of the most important buildings of the period: the stables of the Château de Chantilly and the Hôtel Biron in Paris. He also created innovative interior designs, the most notable, the separation of private and public spaces for the Palais Bourbon in Paris.

== Career ==
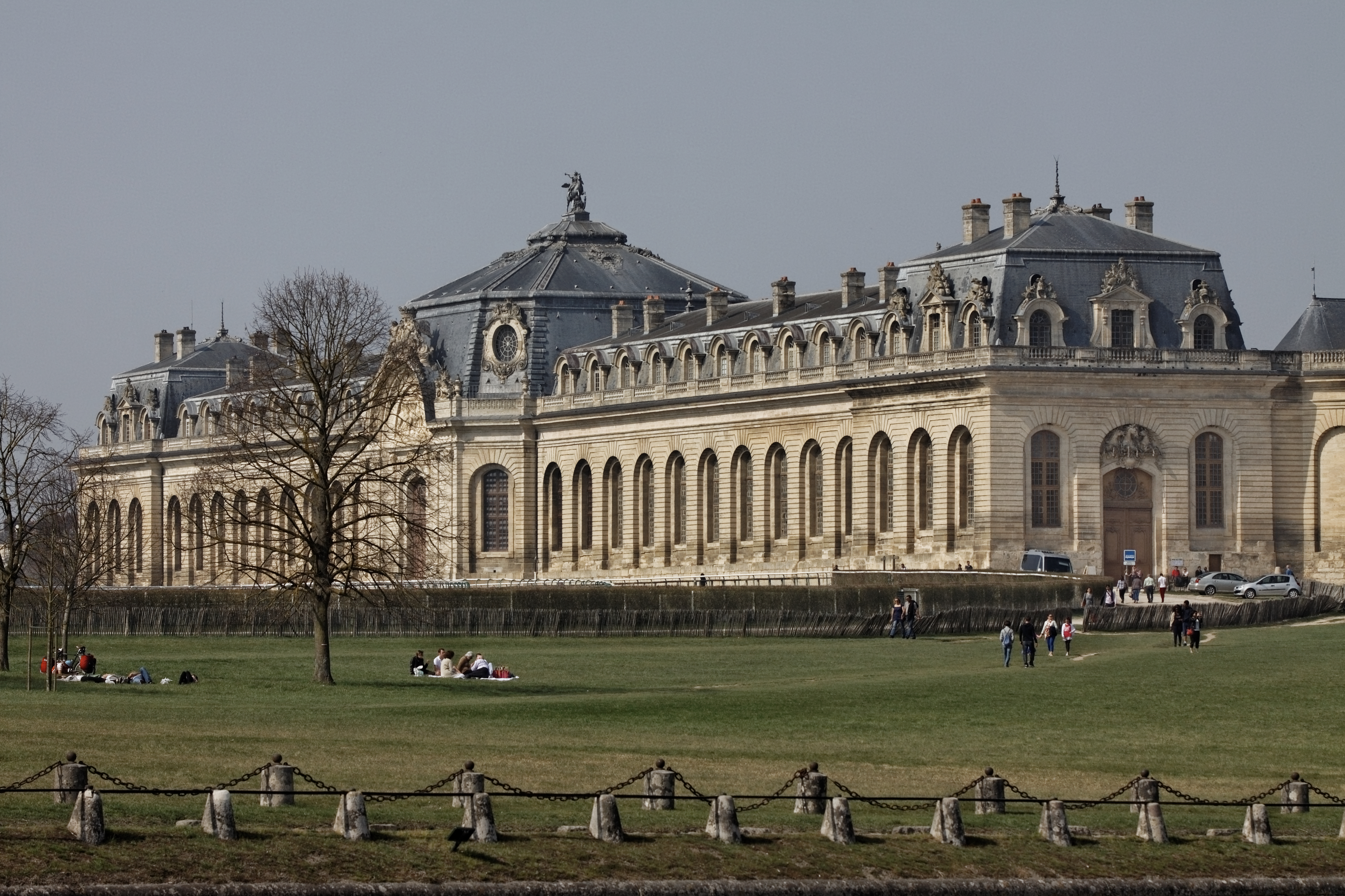
The stables at Chantilly

Jean Aubert was court architect to the Princes of Condé. He was the son of Jean-Jacques Aubert, master carpenter in the Bâtiments du Roi, and was trained in the large atelier of Jules Hardouin-Mansart. The young Aubert was employed in the Bâtiments du Roi as a designer from 1703. In 1707, Hardouin-Mansart had him appointed an architecte du Roi and attempted to get him seated in the second class of the Académie royale d'architecture. As a protégé of Hardouin-Mansart, Aubert may have come into conflict with Robert de Cotte, Hardouin-Mansart's successor as premier architecte though not as director at the Bâtiments du Roi. Diversifying his commissions, Aubert became the architect to the Bourbon-Condé: for them he worked on the Château de Saint-Maur (1709–10), the Château de Chantilly, and other lesser possessions.

Jules Hardouin-Mansart had provided Henri-Jules de Bourbon-Condé plans for the complete transformation of his Château de Chantilly. They were realized by Daniel Gittard, and by Aubert after 1708, though documentation for work other than for the stables is lacking (Kimball p 131). The destruction of these works at the Grand Château of Chantilly (begun in December 1718, according to Fiske Kimball) during the Revolution prevents an assessment of their nature, with the exception of the fine interiors of the Petit Château, which were sufficiently complete for the Regent to be lodged there 4 November 1722 at the return of the court from the coronation of Louis XV, and the famous stables, constructed for the duc de Bourbon, between 1719 and 1735.

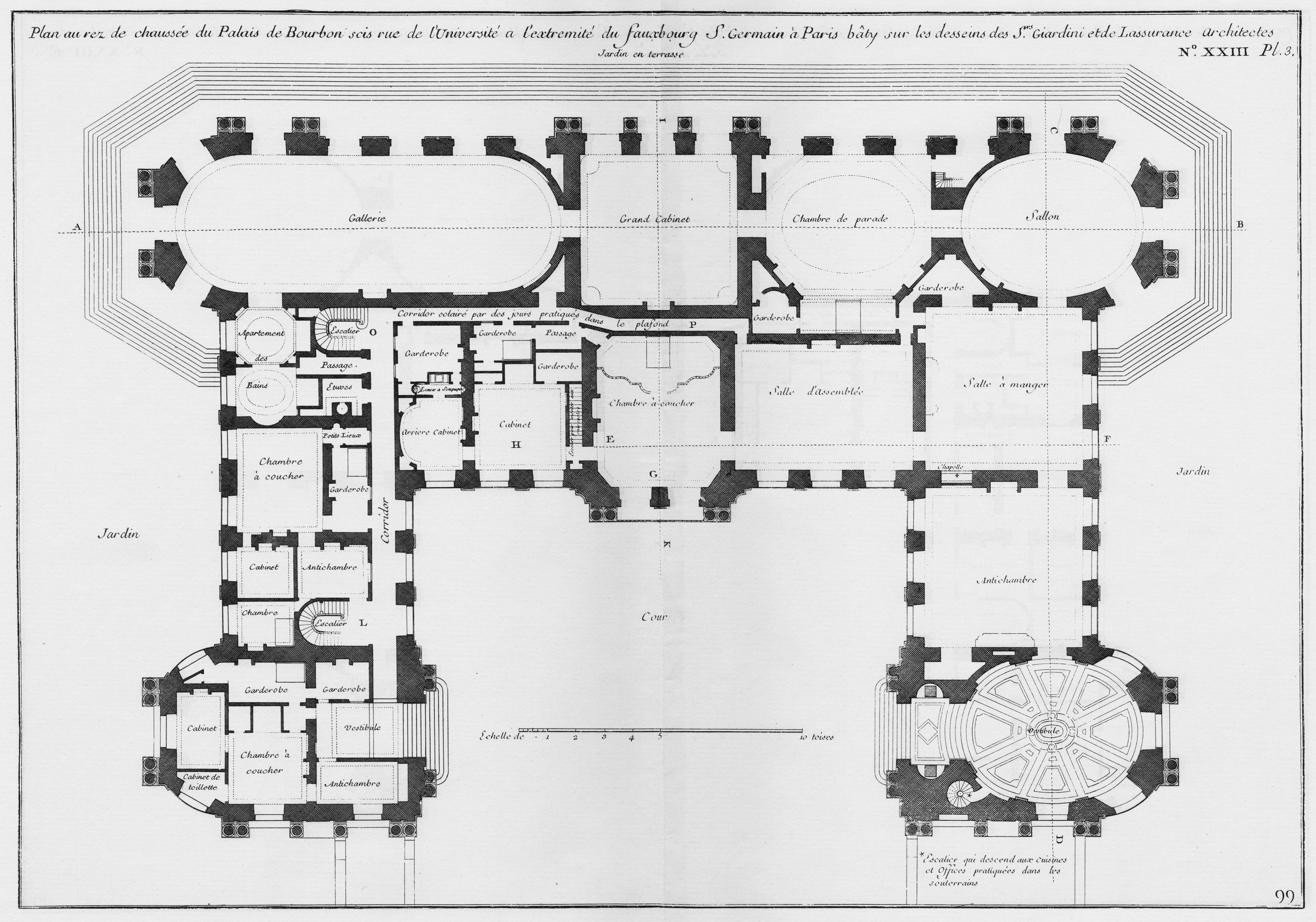
Plan of the Palais Bourbon, as designed by Aubert

From 1724 Jean Aubert worked in Paris on the Palais Bourbon fronting the Seine, which was built for Louise Françoise de Bourbon (1673-1743), duchesse de Bourbon. The plans had been consigned to an Italian architect named Giardini, of whom little is known save that he died in 1722. Pierre Cailleteau Lassurance, who succeeded him in the project and designed the decor of the vestibule (Kimball 1943 p 130), died himself two years later. Aubert took up the project, working with the already-established foundations, but redistributing the magnificently-finished apartments and introducing elliptical salons. For the decoration of the interiors he was constrained to work with Jacques Gabriel, who had been introduced to the duchess's confidence by her advisor, Abraham Peyrenc de Moras. The Palais Bourbon has undergone many transformations since, but Aubert's work can be seen in six plates of Jean Mariette, Architecture françoise.

Right next to the Palais Bourbon, Jean Aubert was also put in charge of the Hôtel de Lassay, which Lassurance had also begun, for the marquis de Lassay, the lover of the duchesse de Bourbon. If the edifice came under some criticism, its interiors marked a step towards the freest rococo.

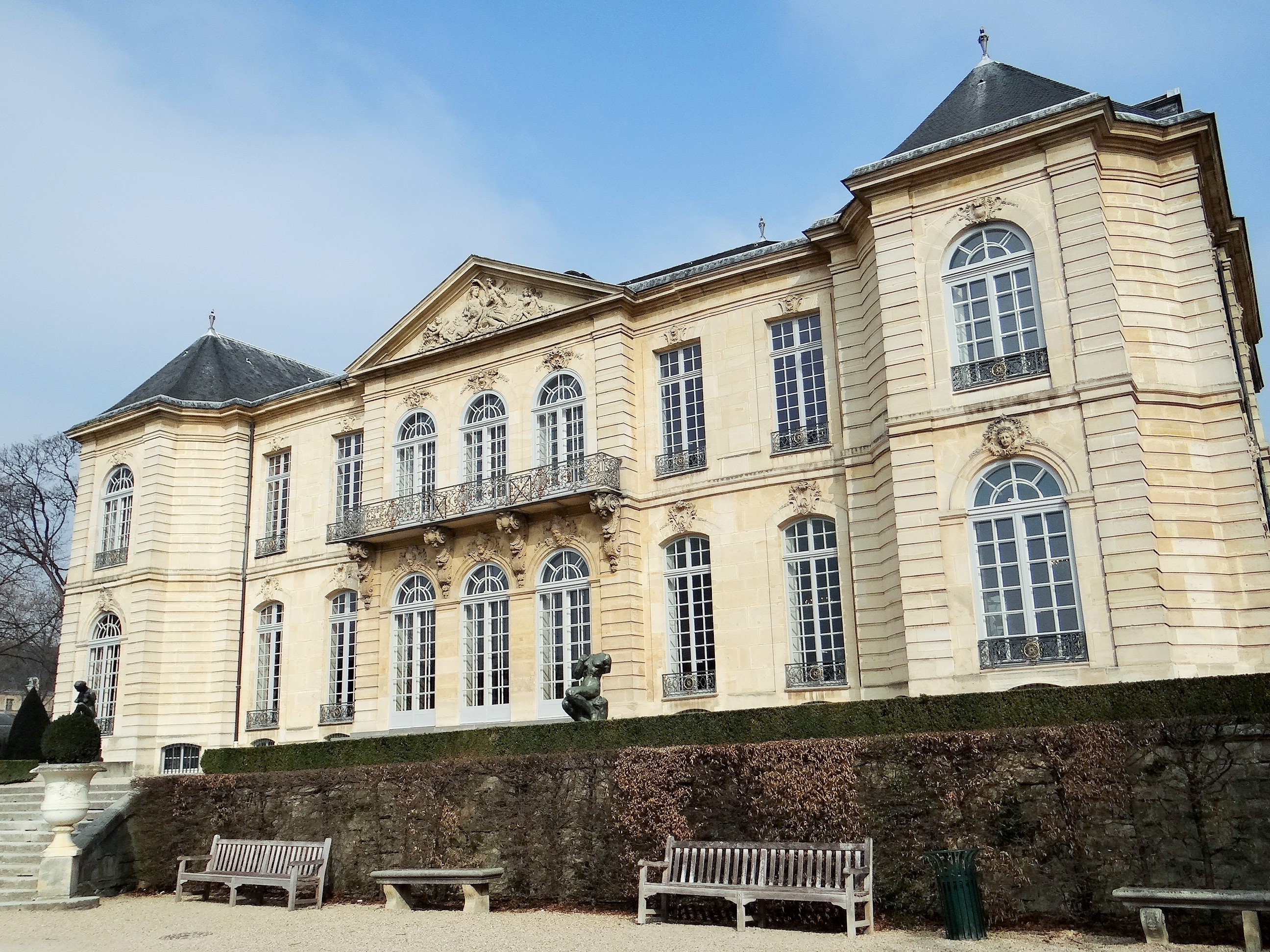
Garden facade of the Hôtel Biron

Between 1728 and 1731 Aubert constructed for the wealthy speculator Abraham Peyrenc de Moras the Hôtel Biron, named for a later owner, which now houses the Musée Rodin. Jacques Gabriel's role in its construction has recently been disallowed. In 1736, he built a little annex to the hôtel, which had been purchased from the widow of Peyrenc de Moras by the duchesse du Maine, herself a Bourbon-Condé by birth.

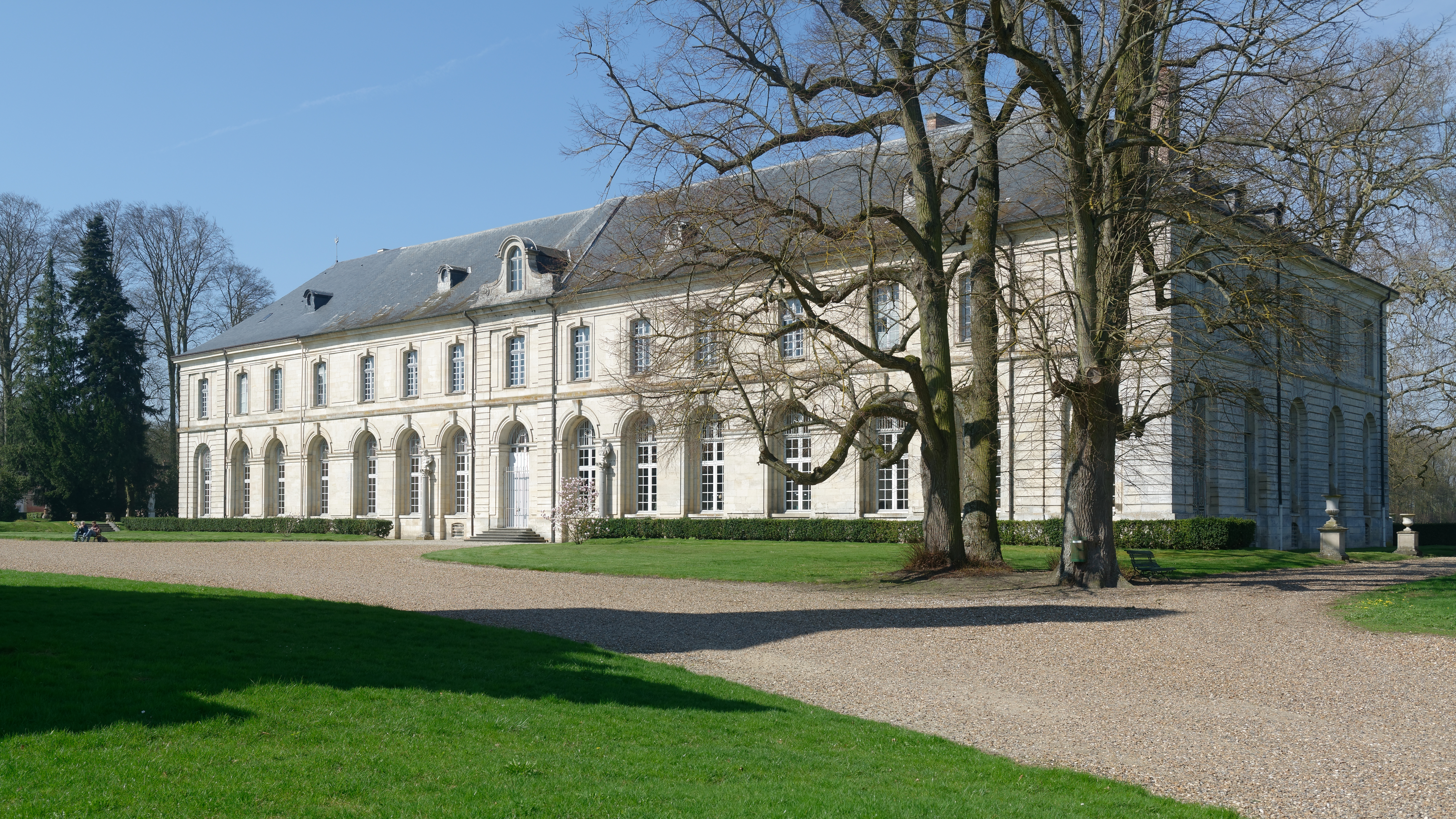
Aubert's château for Chaalis Abbey

Jean Aubert frequented the unofficial Académie du Petit-Luxembourg, in the Hôtel du Petit Luxembourg, that was founded in 1729 by the comte-abbé de Clermont, another member of the house of Condé, the younger brother of the builder of the stables of Chantilly. For the abbé, who was commendatory abbot of Chaalis, Aubert created the plans for the reconstruction of Chaalis Abbey in 1736. Begun in 1739 and intended as a large quadrangle, only the entrance wing with the abbot's residence was completed. Further work was halted in 1745 due to lack of funds and never resumed.

In 1738 Aubert built the lodgings at the Abbey of Fontevraud where Mesdames de France, the daughters of Louis XV, passed some years of their youth under the supervision of the abbesse de Montmorin. Jean Aubert married Geneviève Brunault, the couple was childless. In Paris they lived in rue des Tournelles, probably in one of the buildings there that belonged to the heirs of Mansart.

== Principal works ==
- Stables of the Château de Chantilly, 1719-1735.
- Palais-Bourbon, rue de l'Université, Paris, 1724-1730.
- Hôtel de Lassay, rue de l'Université, Paris, 1726-1730.
- Hôtel Biron, the Musée Rodin, 1728-1731.
- Château at Chaalis Abbey, 1736.
