= Hôtel Biron =

Hôtels particulier in Paris

Coordinates: 48°51′19″N 2°18′57″E

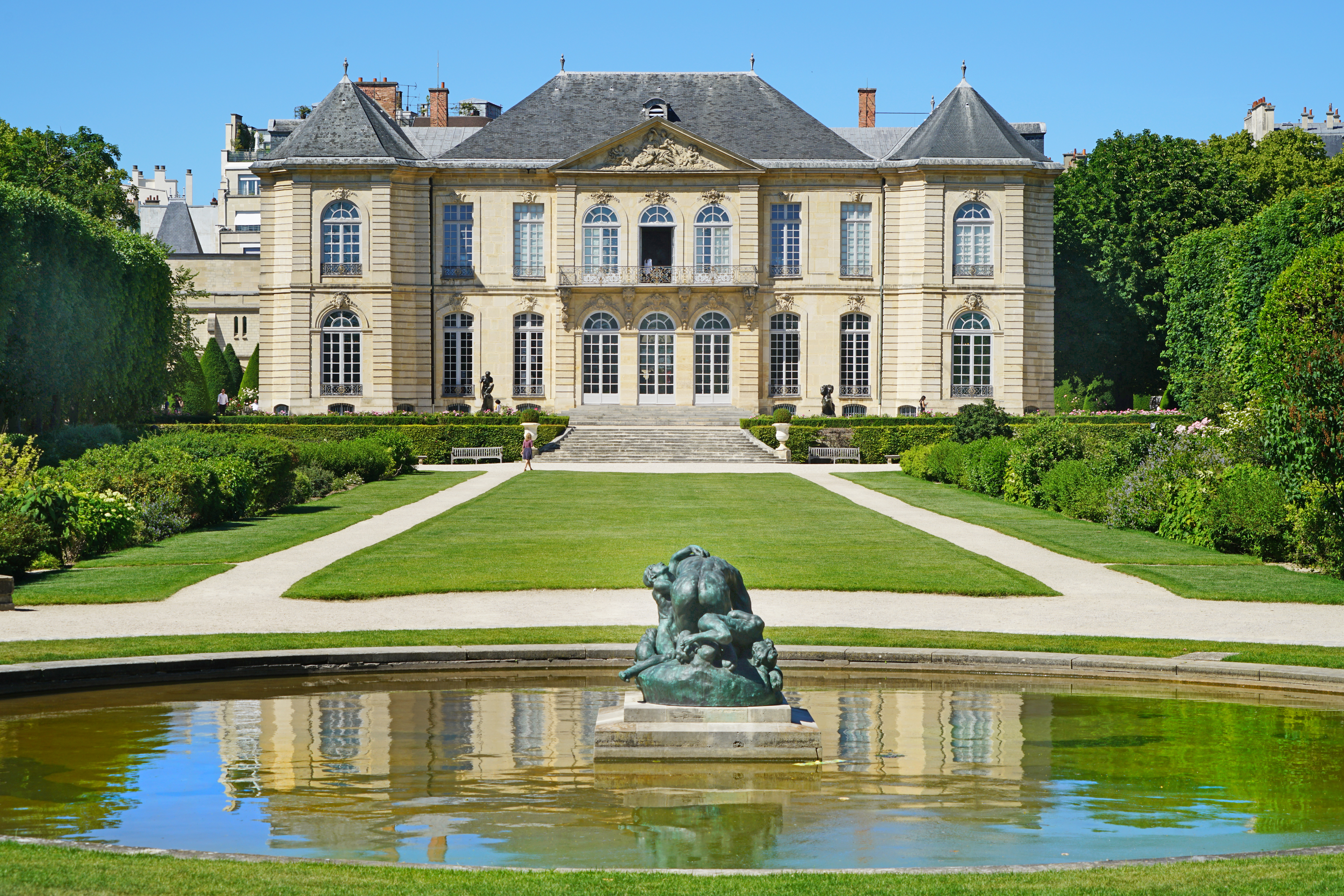
- View of Hôtel Biron from the garden
- Interactive map of the Hôtel Biron area

General information
- Location: Paris, France

The Hôtel Biron (French pronunciation: [otɛl biʁɔ̃]), known initially as the Hôtel Peyrenc-de-Moras and later as the Hôtel du Maine, is an hôtel particulier located at 77 rue de Varenne, in the 7th arrondissement of Paris, that was built from 1727 to 1732, to the designs of the architect Jean Aubert. Since 1919, it has housed the Musée Rodin, dedicated to the work of Auguste Rodin.

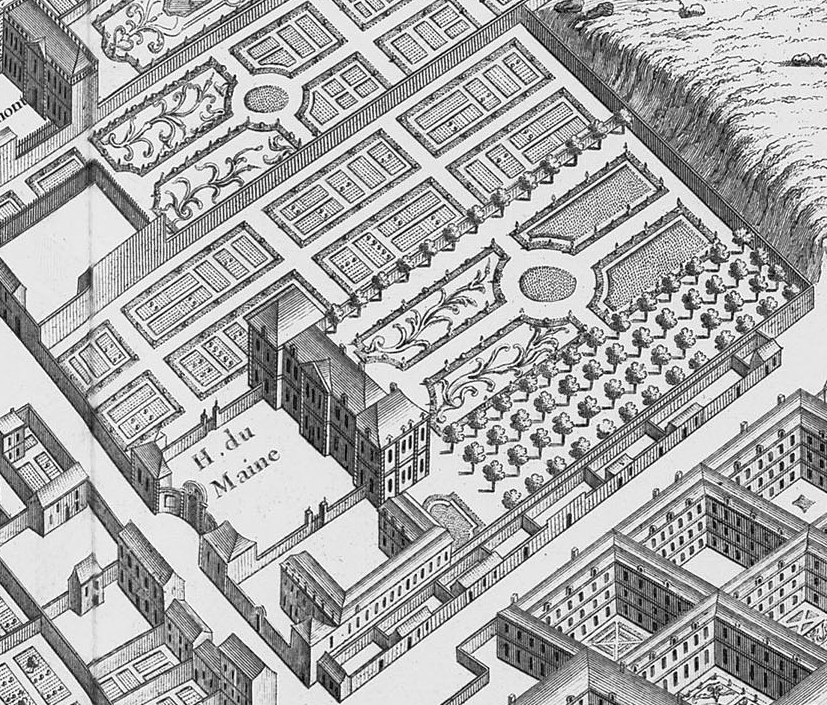
Grounds as depicted on the 1739 Turgot map of Paris

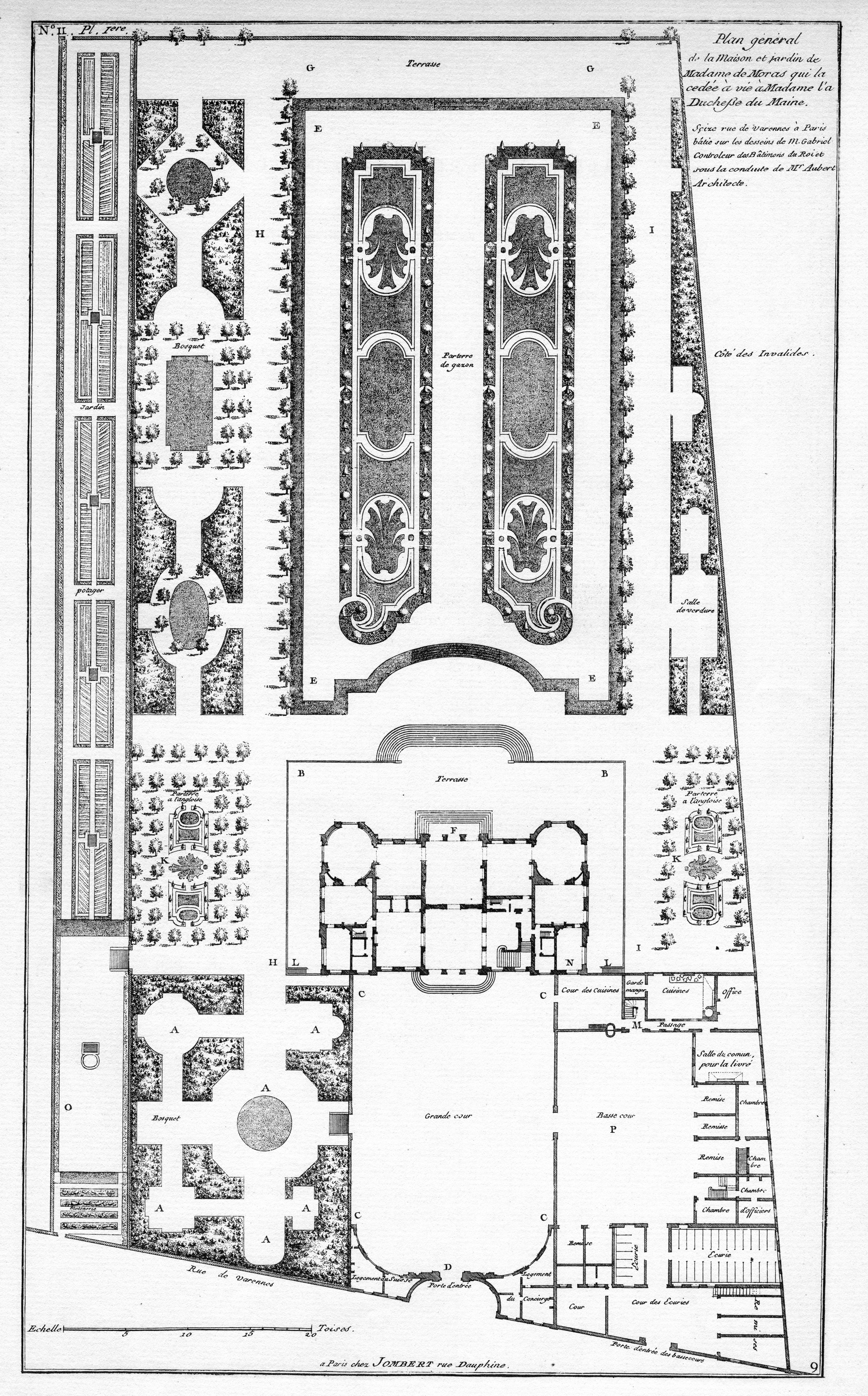
Site plan from Blondel's Architecture françoise (1752)

== History ==
=== Construction and early modifications ===
The hôtel was built for a financier, Abraham Peyrenc de Moras, who had speculated successfully in the ill-fated paper money schemes of John Law that had ruined many, at a time when the Faubourg Saint-Germain was still suburban in character. His house was built as a free-standing structure, not entre cour et jardin ("between entrance court and garden") with party walls against adjoining buildings, as hôtels in more densely built quarters of Paris were traditionally built since the seventeenth century. The house is still surrounded by three hectares (7.3 acres) of grounds. The house had boiseries carved in the full-blown rococo manner and has two elliptical salons that form attached pavilions at the corners of the garden front. There were sixteen medallions or overdoor paintings by François Lemoyne, premier peintre du roi, enframed in the paneling.

The Hôtel Peyrenc-de-Moras, as it then was, was completed in the year 1732, just a year before Peyrenc's death. His widow leased the house to the duchesse du Maine, who had married a natural son of Louis XIV; she took possession in January 1737 (Kimball loc. cit.), and made some minor changes. Upon the death of the duchess in 1753, the mansion became the property of the maréchal de Biron, hero of Fontenoy, whose name it has carried.

A plan of the house and gardens as they were in 1752, shows the deep terrace at the rear with a few wide bowed steps that led to matching parterres containing shaped compartments set in gravel and surrounded by shrubs tightly clipped in cones which flanked a wide central gravel walk. To the left of the deep cour d'honneur and entered from it, neatly clipped cabinets de verdure—small open-air rooms and recesses in fanciful shapes, connected by short galleries—were cut into solid greenery. To the right of the court was a subsidiary stable courtyard. Soon the gardens were swept away by the duc de Biron, in favour of a miniature park à l'Anglaise, achieved with trelliswork. When the "comte du Nord", the future Tsar Paul I of Russia, and his countess (who were traveling technically incognito for pleasure) visited Paris in 1782, they toured the garden, "one of the wonders of Paris, admiring the beauty of the flowers and the variety of the borders. They walked among the flower beds and the shrubberies, marvelling at the boldness and elegance of the trellis work forming gateways, arcades, grottoes, domes, Chinese pavilions..."

=== Conversion to school ===
By the end of the eighteenth century, the faubourg was becoming demodé, with the westward development of fashionable Paris on the Rive Droite. The duc de Biron's heir, Armand Louis de Gontaut, duc de Lauzun, was guillotined in 1793. During Napoleon's reign, the Hôtel de Biron was the seat of the Papal legate and then of the Russian ambassador. In 1820, it was given to the Société du Sacré-Coeur de Jésus, whose Dames du Sacre-Coeur, dedicated to the education of young women, converted the hotel into a boarding school for girls from aristocratic families. They stripped the house of all luxuries, mirrors and boiseries and added a chapel.

=== Closure of school and conversion to museum ===
Under the 1905 French law on the separation of Church and State, however, the school was forced to close. The house was subdivided into lodgings, and plans were afoot to demolish the mansion entirely and replace it with a block of flats. Auguste Rodin rented several rooms on the ground floor in which to store his sculptures. The rooms became his studio; there he worked and entertained friends among the overgrown gardens. In the year 1909, Rodin, at the height of his fame, began to agitate for the Hôtel Biron to become a museum of his work. Some restoration work was carried out in 1911–1912 by the architect Henri Eustache. Rodin proposed to make a bequest of his property, his archives and the contents of his studio at the time of his death, and the French government accepted in 1916. The museum opened in 1919.

=== Recent history ===
Since World War II, the Musée Rodin has been able to buy back boiseries and decorative paintings formerly in the house, which were stripped out by the Dames du Sacre-Coeur and sold. In the 1980s, the museum was able to buy two of Lemoyne's overdoors, Venus Showing Cupid the Ardour of his Arrows (acquired in 1985), and the Labours of Penelope (acquired in 1989), and restore them to their original positions. In 1993, the landscape architect Jacques Sgard remodeled and replanted the gardens to enhance the display of some of Rodin's larger works.
