= Joel Felix (historian) =

Joël Félix (born 1960) is a professor of European history at the University of Reading. Félix is a specialist in the Ancien Régime and the French Revolution.

== Selected publications ==
- Louis XVI et Marie-Antoinette. Un couple en politique, Payot, Paris, 2006. (awarded the prix Paul-Michel Perret by the Académie des Sciences Morales et Politiques, 2006).
- Finances et politique au siècle des Lumières: le ministère L'Averdy, 1763-1768, Comité pour l'Histoire Economique et Financière de la France, Paris, 1999.
- Economie et finances sous l'Ancien Régime, guide du chercheur, 1523-1789, Comité pour l'Histoire Economique et Financière de la France, Paris, 1994.
- Les Magistrats du Parlement de Paris, 1771-1789, Sedopols, Paris, 1990.
