= Club de l'Entresol =

18th-century discussion group in Paris

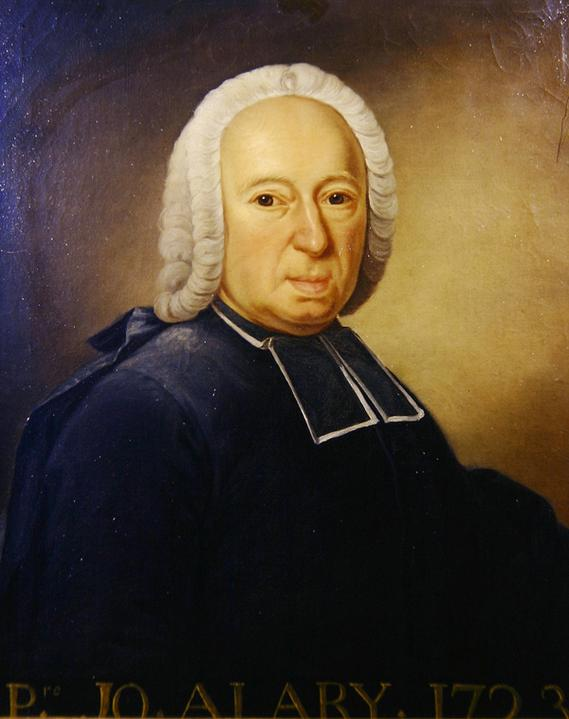
Pierre-Joseph Alary

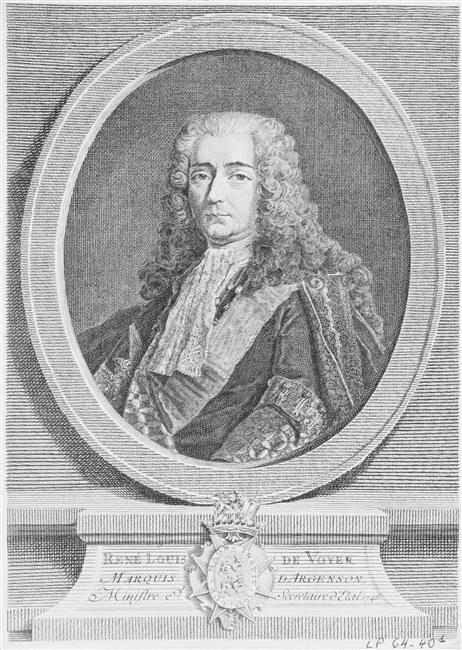
René Louis de Voyer de Paulmy d'Argenson

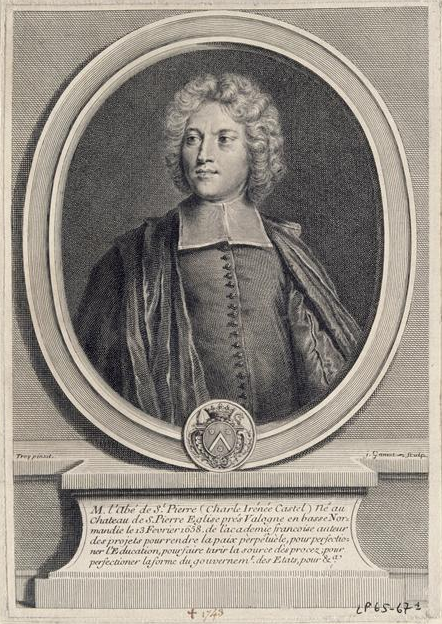
Charles-Irénée Castel de Saint-Pierre

The Club de l'Entresol (French pronunciation: [klœb də lɑ̃tʁəsɔl], "Mezzanine Club") was a discussion group and early think tank in Paris, active from 1723 to 1731, created and primarily led by Abbot Pierre-Joseph Alary.

== Name and background ==
The club's name came from the fact that at its inception, Alary lived in the mezzanine (French: entresol) of the hôtel particulier of Charles-Jean-François Hénault at 7 place Vendôme, also known as Hôtel Le Bas de Montargis for its original builder in 1708. The club kept its name even as Alary moved to other apartments where the meetings were subsequently held, including when he lived at the Royal Library. The adoption of the word club was suggested by Henry St John, 1st Viscount Bolingbroke, who was exiled in Paris and close to Alary in the early 1720s. It ostensibly echoed the English model of clubs for free discussion of political and economic questions, at a time of widespread Anglophilia in Paris under the Régence.

In spite of its English-sounding name, the inspiration for the club was homegrown. Its roots went back to the académie du Luxembourg, a short-lived discussion group led in 1691–1692 by François-Timoléon de Choisy whose members included such luminaries as François Lefebvre de Caumartin, Louis de Courcillon, Louis Cousin, Bernard Le Bovier de Fontenelle, Barthélemy d'Herbelot, Charles Perrault, and Eusèbe Renaudot. The Académie du Luxembourg was well known to Alary from the memories of the brothers Philippe and Louis de Courcillon and of two of Choisy's relatives, the marquis de Balleroy and the marquis d'Argenson. A more recent experience had been the académie politique established at the Louvre by Jean-Baptiste Colbert, Marquess of Torcy, which operated from 1712 to 1715 and again from 1717 to 1720 and from which the club's members drew lessons about how best to organize their activities.

The main source of information about the club's activity is the memoirs written by René-Louis d'Argenson, who was a leading member of the club, together with Alary and the Abbé de Saint-Pierre.

== Activity ==
The club met every Saturday, between 5pm and 8pm, at Alary's apartment. It was frequented by about twenty scholars who can be viewed as forerunners of the Age of Enlightenment. Its membership was exclusively male and French, though attendees also included women and foreigners, e.g. Madame du Deffand and the future Madame de Pompadour as well as Bolingbroke at the end of his Parisian stay. The club's activities included readings on current affairs, with emphasis on foreign uncensored sources such as Dutch periodicals in French language.

It was more than a mere literary salon given its structured program, and differed from most learned societies by its emphasis on current affairs and public policy, primarily foreign affairs and economics. Members specialized in specific policy areas: e.g. Alary on Germany, d'Argenson on public law and institutions, Balleroy and Champeaux on peace treaties, Verteillac on mixed-government constitutions, d'Autry on Italy, Plélo on government institutions, Pallu on French financial history, Caraman on commerce, d'Oby on French estates-general and parliaments, Saint-Contest on contemporary history, Bragelongne on sovereign houses, La Fautrière on finance and trade, and Saint-Pierre on multiple topics. The older members: Camilly, Coigny, Lassay, Matignon, Noirmoutiers, Pérelle, Pomponne, and Saint-Contest the elder until his death, acted as a sounding and advisory board for their fellows' work. The latter prepared their contributions in advance of the club's weekly sessions. These texts were not printed let alone published; instead, their manuscripts were kept by Alary.

Both the policy focus and structured research program made the club de l'entresol a precursor of more recent think tanks, even though its output was not in the public domain given the lack of freedom of expression in France at the time. Indeed, publicity is what led to the club's downfall, according to its chronicler the Marquis d'Argenson. D'Alary had to spend more time at the royal court in Versailles after he was given the role of instituteur des Enfants de France (teacher of the royal family's children), and that made the Paris-based club more visible there. D'Argenson also cites Abbé de Pomponne as not discreet enough, e.g. on the sensitive matter of French attitudes to the Pragmatic Sanction of 1713. France's chief minister Cardinal Fleury acknowledged the club's value and encouraged its work, but eventually decided on its closure in 1731 after it became an object of court controversy.

== Members ==
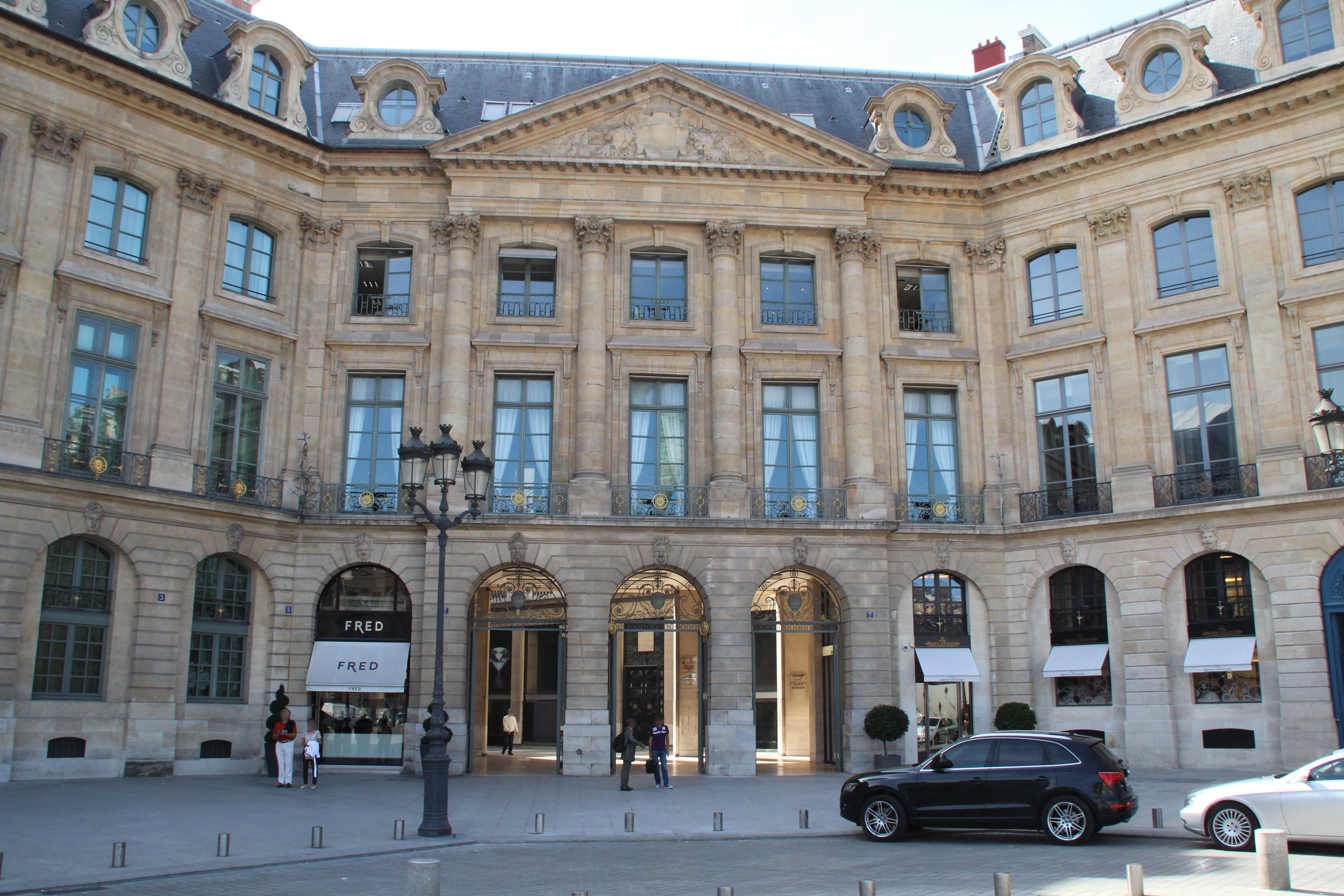
7 Place Vendôme, where the club was born

In his memoirs, René-Louis d'Argenson listed the members of the club in the following order:

- Pierre-Joseph Alary (1689–1770)
- Jacques-Claude-Augustin de la Cour, marquis de Balleroy (1694–1773)
- François de Franquetot de Coigny (1670–1759)
- Thomas Goyon de Matignon (1684–1766)
- René Louis de Voyer de Paulmy d'Argenson (1694–1757)
- Gérard Lévesque de Champeaux (1694–1778)
- Thibaut de La Brousse de Verteillac (1684–1778)
- Louis-Joseph de Goujon de Thuisy, comte d'Autry (1674–1749)
- Louis de Bréhan de Plélo (1699–1734)
- Bertrand René Pallu (1692–1758)
- François de Riquet, comte de Caraman (1698–1760)
- Andrew Michael Ramsay (1686–1743)
- Dominique-Claude Barberie de Saint-Contest (1668–1730)
- François Dominique de Barberie de Saint-Contest (1701–1754), son of the former
- Christophe-Bernard de Bragelongne (1688–1744)
- Armand de Madaillan de Lesparre, marquis de Lassay (1652–1738)
- Antoine François de La Trémoille, duc de Noirmoutier (1652–1733)
- Louis Davy de la Fautrière (1700–1756)
- Pierre Blouet de Camilly (1666–1753)
- Antoine-Robert Pérelle (?-1735)
- Henri Charles Arnauld de Pomponne (1669–1756)
- Charles-Irénée Castel de Saint-Pierre (1658–1743)
- Pierre François Delatre d'Oby (1696?–1729)

D'Argenson also mentions that Abbot Franchini, ambassador of Tuscany, and Nicolas Prosper Bauyn d'Angervilliers sought to become members but were not included, the former for being a foreigner, and the latter because of his appointment to public office; and that Horatio Walpole made a presentation to the club in 1726, at his own request. Montesquieu participated in the club's activities and gave there a reading of his dialogue between Sulla and Eucrates. Jean-Baptiste Colbert, Marquess of Torcy was another occasional participant. The mention in some online sources of Claude Adrien Helvétius as a member is improbable, given his young age at the time of the club's activity and the fact that he spent much of his youth in Caen.

== See also ==
- Sociedad Económica de los Amigos del País
- Coppet group
- Saint-Simon Foundation
