= Louis Philogène Brûlart, vicomte de Puisieulx =

French diplomat and nobleman

The Marquis of Puisieulx
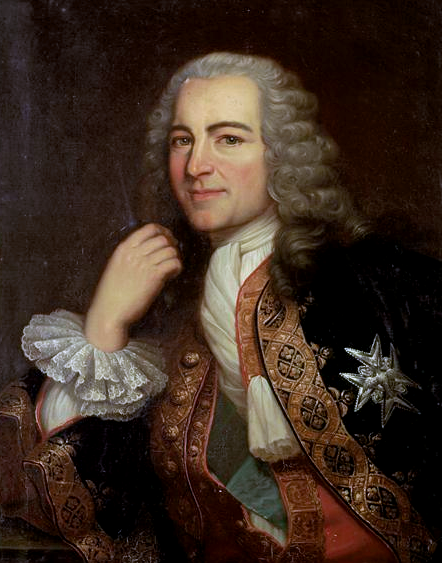
- Louis-Philogène Brulart, Marquis de Puysieux

Secretary of State for Foreign Affairs
- In office 27 January 1747 – 9 September 1751
- Preceded by: The Marquis of Argenson
- Succeeded by: The Marquis of Saint-Contest

French Ambassador to the Kingdom of Naples
- In office October 1735 – April 1739

Governor of Épernay
- In office 1727–1770
- Preceded by: Carloman Philogène Brulart, Comte de Sillery

Personal details
- Born: 12 May 1702 Paris, France
- Died: 8 December 1770 (aged 68) Paris, France
- Other political affiliations: Order of Saint Michael Order of the Holy Spirit
- Spouse: Charlotte Félicité Le Tellier (1708–1783)
- Children: Adelaide Felicite (1725-1785)

Louis Philogène Brulart, Comte de Sillery and Marquis de Puysieux (or Puysieulx) (1702-1770) was a French diplomat and nobleman who served as Foreign Minister from 1747 to 1751 but was forced to retire due to ill-health.

== Life ==
Louis Philogène Brulart was born 12 May 1702, only son of Carloman Philogène Brulart, Comte de Sillery (ca. 1663–1727) and his wife Mary-Louise Bigot (1662-1746); he also had a sister, Marie (1707-1771). His father commanded the Regiment de Conti but his career ended after he was badly wounded at Landen in 1693.

He married Charlotte Félicité Le Tellier (1708–1783), on 19 July 1722 and they had a daughter, Adelaide Felicite (1725-1785). Based on the numerous memoirs of courtiers such as those of the Duke de Richelieu and Marquis de Argenson and others, by 1729, the Marquis de Puysieux took as his mistress the also married Louise Julie de Nesle-Mailly, Comtesse de Mailly. Madame de Mailly would later on be the first mistress of the King Louis Louis XV in late 1732 while her other affair with Puysieux formally ended in 1735 after he was assigned in Naples as ambassador. Louis Brulart was also godfather to Charles-Alexis Brûlart (1737-1793), Comte de Genlis and acted as his guardian following the death of his parents. In 1762, Charles-Alexis married the author Stéphanie Félicité (1746-1830); elected to the National Convention in 1792 as a member of the Girondins faction, he was executed with many of his colleagues in 1793.

== Career ==
De Puysieux came from a family with a long and distinguished record of service to the French Crown, going back to the 14th century; his relatives included Pierre Brûlart (1583-1640), joint Secretary of State for Foreign Affairs and War from 1617 to 1626, while his uncle Roger Brûlart (1640-1719) was Ambassador to Switzerland.

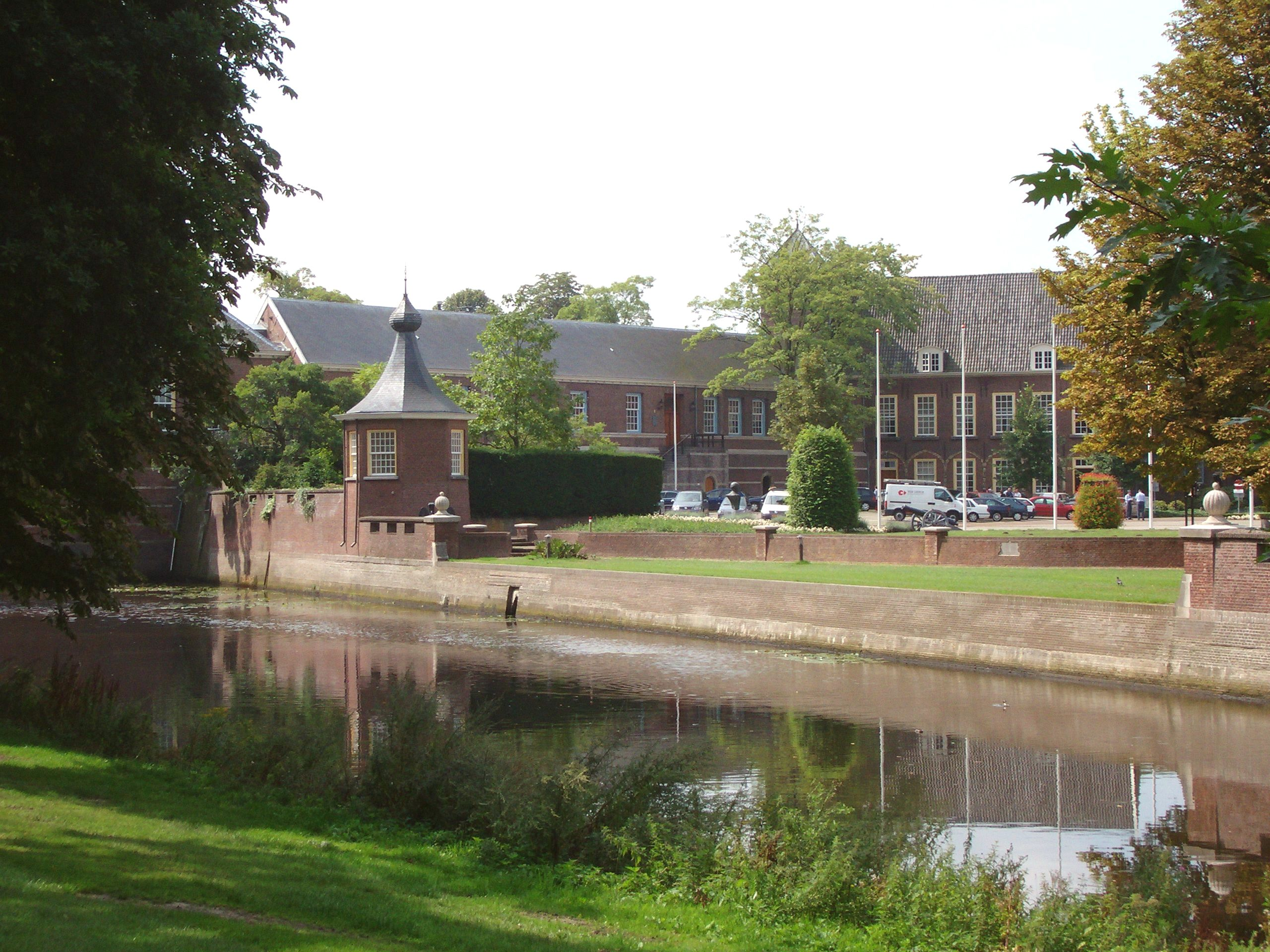
Breda Castle, location of the 1746 Congress of Breda

Like his uncle, he became a diplomat and as was then common, also held a military commission. He was promoted Brigadier general in 1734 but France was mostly at peace from 1714 to 1733 and he saw little if any active service. In 1735, he was appointed French Ambassador to the Kingdom of Naples in 1735; lost in 1713 after the Treaty of Utrecht, Bourbon Spain regained it after the 1733 to 1735 War of the Polish Succession.

Although the War of the Austrian Succession began in 1740, Britain and France only formally became adversaries in 1744. Despite a series of victories in Flanders won by Marshall de Saxe, by 1746 France was close to bankruptcy. De Puysieux was appointed French plenipotentiary to the Congress of Breda, a bilateral negotiation with Britain to end the war. The French terms had been drawn up by Gabriel de Mably, who shortly afterwards fell from favour. This meant negotiations proceeded slowly, especially since the British envoy Lord Sandwich was instructed to delay, in the hope their position in Flanders would improve.

In the January 1747, Britain agreed to fund Austrian and Sardinian forces in Italy and an Allied army of 140,000 in Flanders, increasing to 192,000 in 1748. The British were well aware of France's desperate financial state and although their economy was also impacted, they were far better equipped to finance it. The British Prime Minister Newcastle hoped the death of Philip V in July 1746 would tempt Spain to end their alliance with France, an assumption that proved incorrect.

De Puisieux was withdrawn, allegedly for failing to reach agreement but it was only after their defeat at Lauffeld in July 1747 that Britain proved willing to negotiate seriously. In the end, this was beneficial to his career, since no one was happy with the eventual 1748 Treaty of Aix-la-Chapelle. France seemed to have gained very little in return for its expenditure of money and men; the saying "as stupid as the peace" became a popular phrase in France, expressing contempt for the terms agreed at Breda and Aix-la Chapelle.

== Sources ==
- Browning, Reed (1975). The Duke of Newcastle. Yale University. ISBN 9780300017465.
- Carlos, Ann; Neal, Larry; Wandschneider, Kirsten (2006). "The Origins of National Debt: The Financing and Re-financing of the War of the Spanish Succession". International Economic History Association.
- Hochedlinger, Michael (2003). Austria's Wars of Emergence, 1683-1797. Routledge. ISBN 978-0582290846.
- Lieber, Francis (1836). Encyclopædia Americana: Volume VIII. Deliver, Thomas & Co.
- McLynn, Frank (2008). 1759: The Year Britain Became Master of the World. Vintage. ISBN 978-0099526391.
- Moréri, Louis (1759). Le Grand dictionnaire historique ou Le mélange curieux de l'histoire sacrée; Volume II (PDF). Les Libraires associés, Paris.
- Murphy, Orvile T (1982). Charles Gravier: Comte de Vergennes: French Diplomacy in the Age of Revolution. State University of New York Press. ISBN 978-0873954822.
- Rodger, NAM (2004). Montagu, John, fourth earl of Sandwich (2008 ed.). Oxford DNB.
- Rodger, NAM (1993). The Insatiable Earl: A Life of John Montagu, Fourth Earl of Sandwich, 1718-1792. Harper Collins. ISBN 978-0002157841.
- Savelle, Max (1974). Empires to Nations: Expansion in America, 1713-1824 (Europe and the World in Age of Expansion). University of Minnesota Press. ISBN 978-0816607815.
- Scott, Hamish (2015). The Birth of a Great Power System, 1740-1815. Routledge. ISBN 978-1138134232.

Political offices
Preceded by René de Voyer de Paulmy, marquis d'Argenson	Foreign Minister of France; 27 January 1747 – 9 September 1751	Succeeded by François Dominique de Barberie de Saint-Contest
