= Charles-Irénée Castel de Saint-Pierre =

French author (1658–1743)

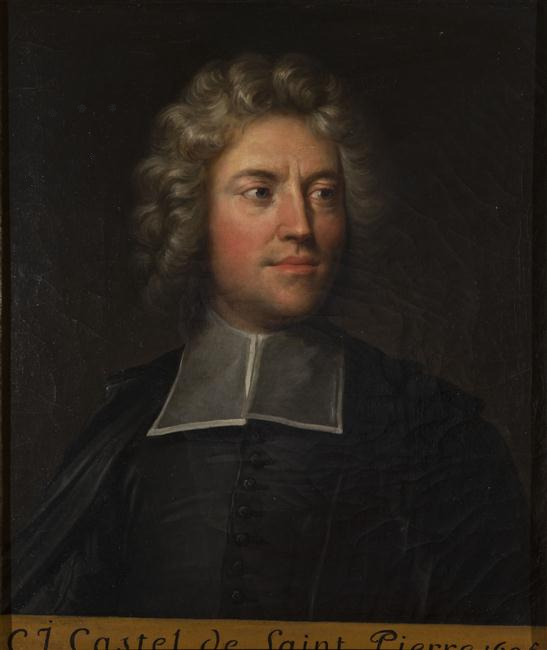
- Born: 18 February 1658; Saint-Pierre-Église, Kingdom of France
- Died: 29 April 1743 (aged 85); Paris, Kingdom of France
- Occupation: Author
- Awards: Académie française

Charles-Irénée Castel, abbé de Saint-Pierre (18 February 1658 – 29 April 1743) was a French writer.

== Biography ==
In 1718, Saint-Pierre published Discours sur la polysynodie, where he proposed that appointed ministers be replaced by elected councils. As a consequence of his criticism of the policy of Louis XIV (died 1715) he was expelled from the Académie later the same year.

In 1723, with Pierre-Joseph Alary he founded the Club de l'Entresol, an early modern think tank in Paris; the club was closed for political reasons in 1731.

He died in Paris on 29 April 1743.

== Ideas ==
Saint-Pierre's works are centered on an acute and visionary criticism of politics, law and social institutions. He had a great influence on Rousseau, who left elaborate examinations of some of them, and was a forerunner of Kant's 1795 essay on perpetual peace. His Projet de paix perpétuelle was published in 1713 in Utrecht, where he was acting as secretary to the French plenipotentiary, the Abbé de Polignac, and his Polysynodie contained severe strictures on the government of Louis XIV, with projects for the administration of France by a system of councils for each department of government. His works include a number of memorials and projects for stopping duelling, equalizing taxation, treating mendicancy, reforming education and spelling, etc. It was not, however, for his suggestions for the reform of the constitution that he was disgraced, but because in the Polysynodie he had refused to Louis XIV the title of le Grand.

Saint-Pierre was one of the first to mention the possibility of a European union made by independent and autonomous states. His work on a European community directly inspired the idea of an international order based on the principle of collective self-defense, and was important to the creation of the Concert of Europe, and later the League of Nations, whose successor is the United Nations Organisation. Friederich the Great of Prussia, writing to Voltaire about the Projet pour rendre la paix perpétuelle en Europe, stated that: "The Abbe de Saint-Pierre has sent me a fine work on how to re-establish peace in Europe. The thing is very practicable. All it lacks to be successful, is the consent of all Europe and a few other such small details."

== Works ==
=== Printed books ===
- Ouvrages de morale et de politique. Rotterdam: J.-D. Beman; Paris: Briasson, 1733–1740
- Projet pour rendre la paix perpétuelle en Europe. Utrecht: A. Schouten, 1713
- A lasting peace through the federation of Europe; and, The state of war English translation
- Discours sur la polysynodie. Amsterdam: Du Villard & Changuion, 1719
- Projet pour perfectionner l'éducation. Paris: Briasson, 1728
- Abrégé du projet de paix perpétuelle. Rotterdam: J.-D. Bernan, 1729.
  - An Abridged Version of the Project for Perpetual Peace, ed. Roderick Pace, trans. Carmen Depasquale. Valletta: Midsea Books, 2009. ISBN 978-9993272373
- De la douceur. Amsterdam: Briasson, 1740
- André Robinet (ed.), Correspondance G. W. Leibniz, Ch. I. Castel de Saint-Pierre, Paris: Centre de philosophie du droit, 1995. ISBN 978-2911495007

=== Correspondence ===
Saint-Pierre exchanged letters with a number of luminaries of his time, including Voltaire. His letters often ended with the formula "Paradise to those who do good".
