= Breda Castle =

Castle in the Netherlands

Breda castle
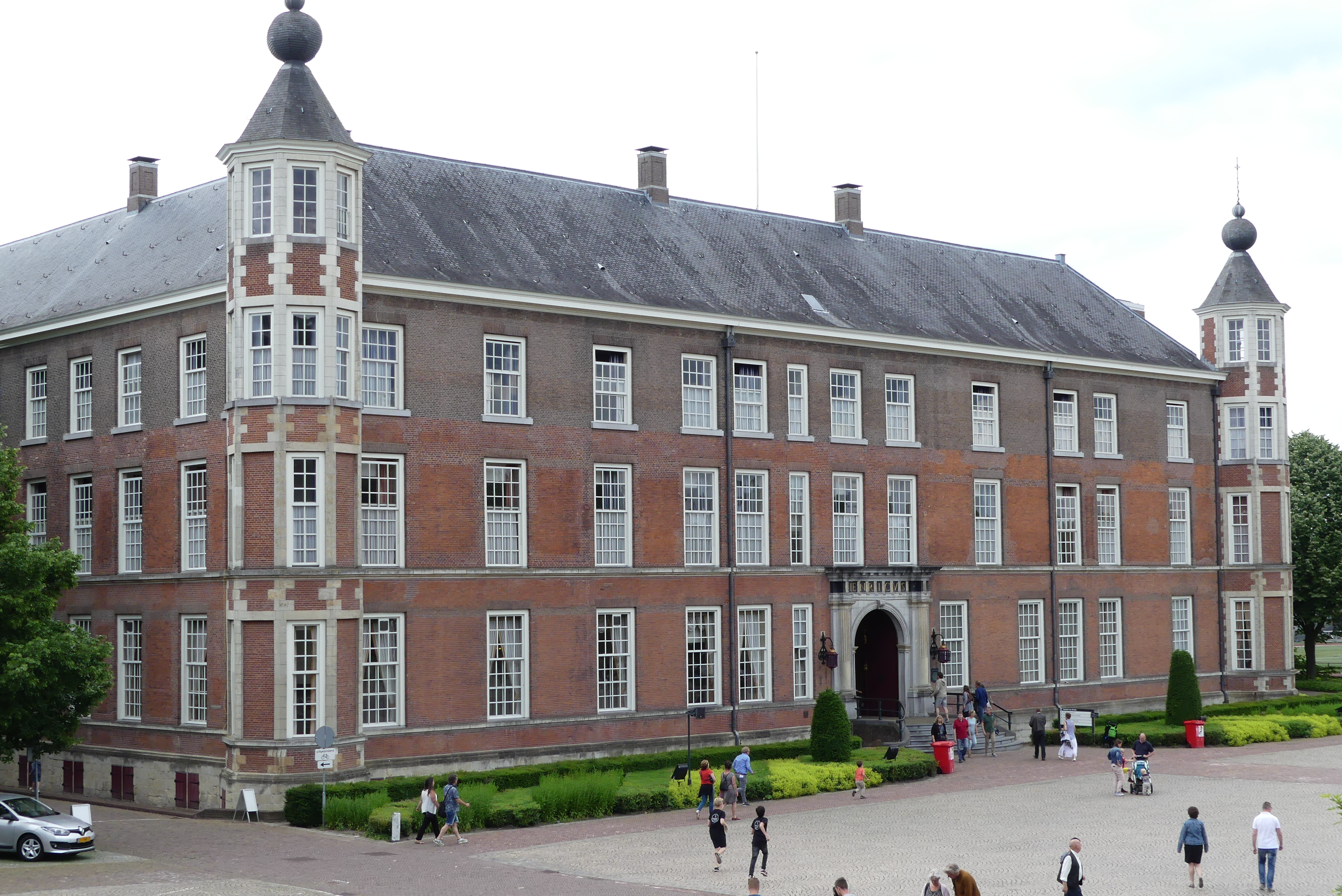
- File:Exterieur Kasteel van Breda P1060336.jpg Breda castle

- Castle of Breda, Beschryving der stadt en lande van Breda (The Hague 1744)

Site information
- Type: Castle
- Owner: Government
- Open to the public: Yes
- Condition: Good

Location
- The Netherlands
- Coordinates: 51°35.29′N 4°46.31′E

Site history
- Built: 15th century
- Built by: Hendrik III
- In use: from 1826 Koninklijke Militaire Academie
- Materials: Brick

Breda Castle is a castle in the city of Breda, in the Netherlands.

== History ==
In the 12th century, a fortress was located at Breda. The city of Breda came into existence near the fortress. In 1353, the Duke of Brabant sold Breda to Jan II of Polanen (Baron of Breda). He reinforced the castle with four towers and a channel. His daughter Johanna of Polanen married in 1403 the German count Engelbert I of Nassau. Their son John IV of Nassau enlarged the castle.

Henry III of Nassau-Breda changed the castle into a Renaissance palace in 1536. He died in 1538 and his son René of Châlon finished the castle and built a chapel in 1540. René of Châlon died without any children and the castle became property of his German cousin, William I of Orange, during his battle with the Spanish, it had a military function again (Dutch revolt).

In 1667 the Treaty of Breda was signed by England, France and the Republic of the Seven United Netherlands. This ended the second English-Dutch war.

The Stadtholder - later King William III of England - built on the castle between 1686 and 1695, but he and his successors spent little time there. During the period of French occupation in the 18th century, the castle was a military barracks and military hospital. William I of the Netherlands placed it at the disposal of the Royal Military Academy in 1826. Thomas Vincidor built three wings and later King William II of the Netherlands built the fourth wing.

The entrance gate is from the 16th century.

== Breda Congress ==
Between 1746 and 1748 it was the site of the Breda Peace Talks between Britain and France during the War of the Austrian Succession. The talks formed the foundation for the eventual peace settlement at Treaty of Aix-la-Chapelle.

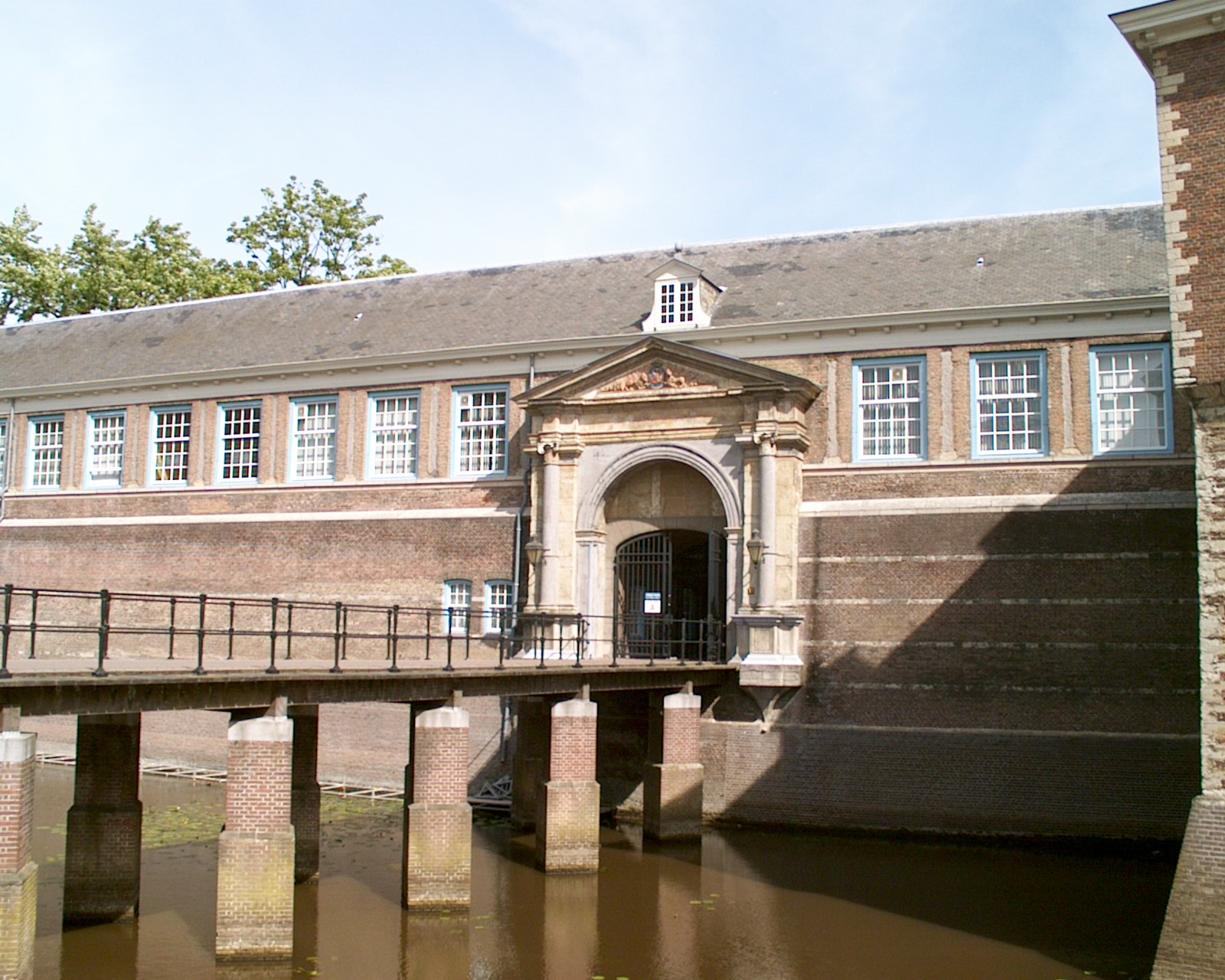
Stadtholder’s gate

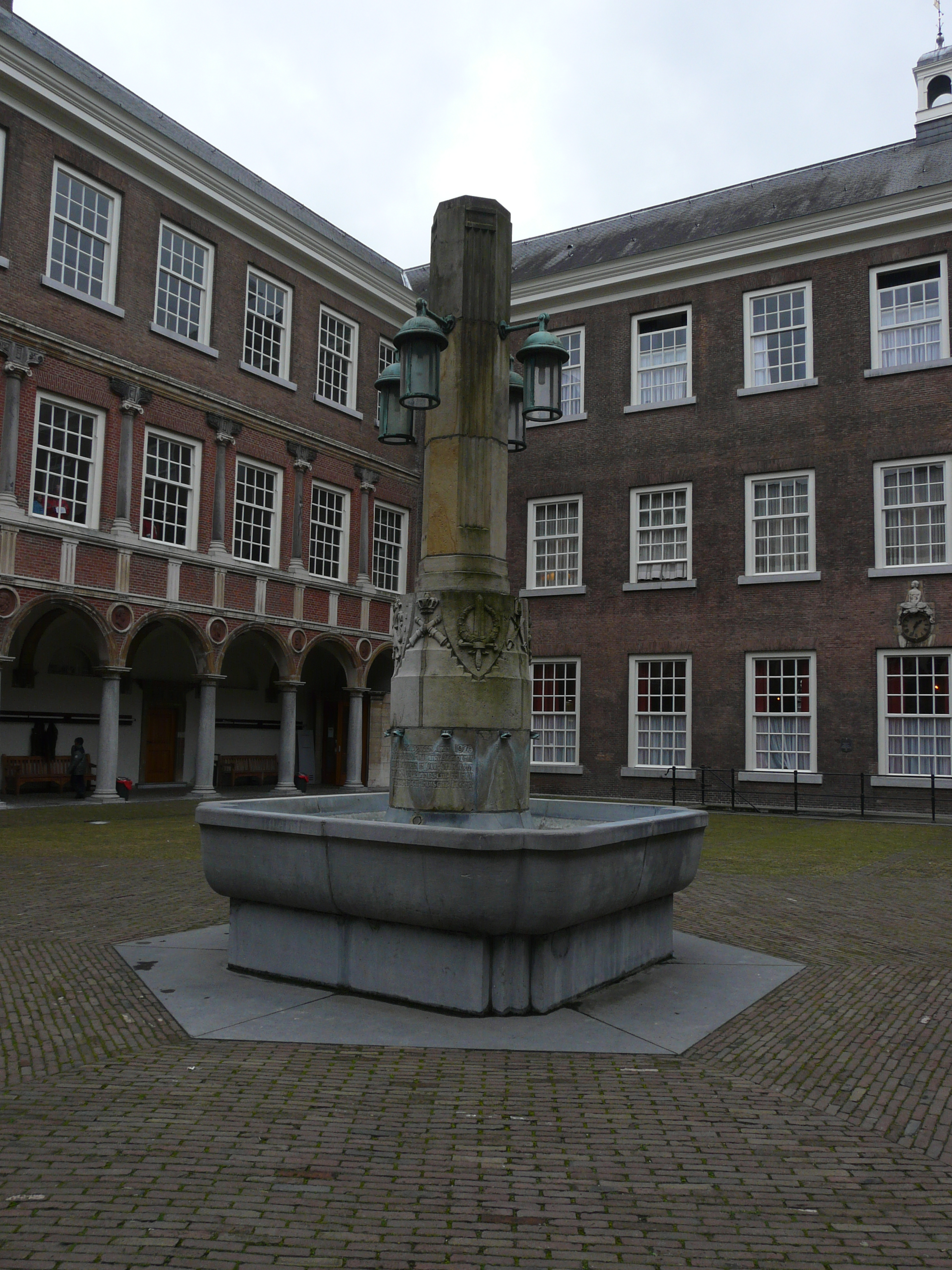
Courtyard of Breda Castle

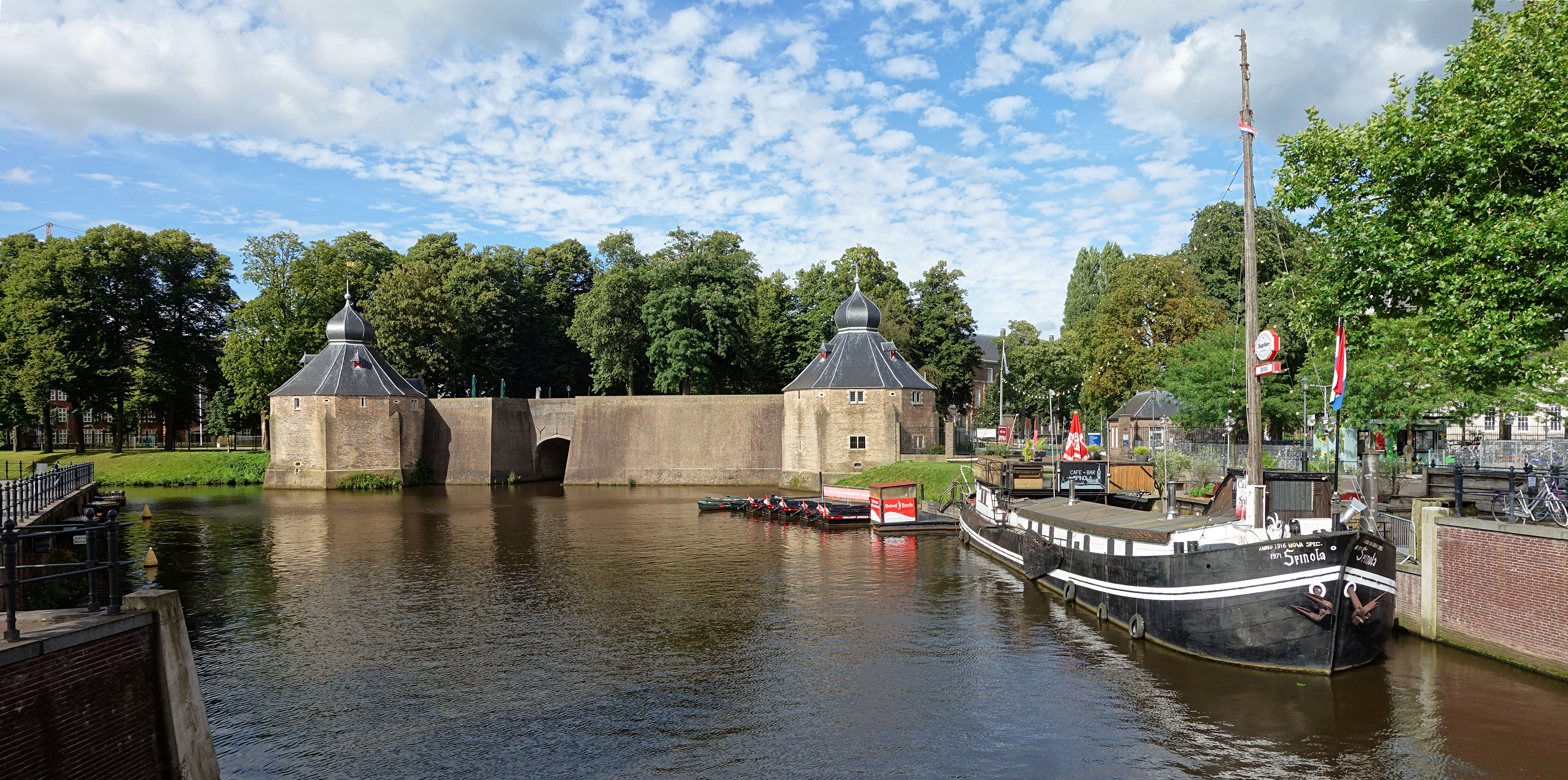
Spanjaardsgat, water gate

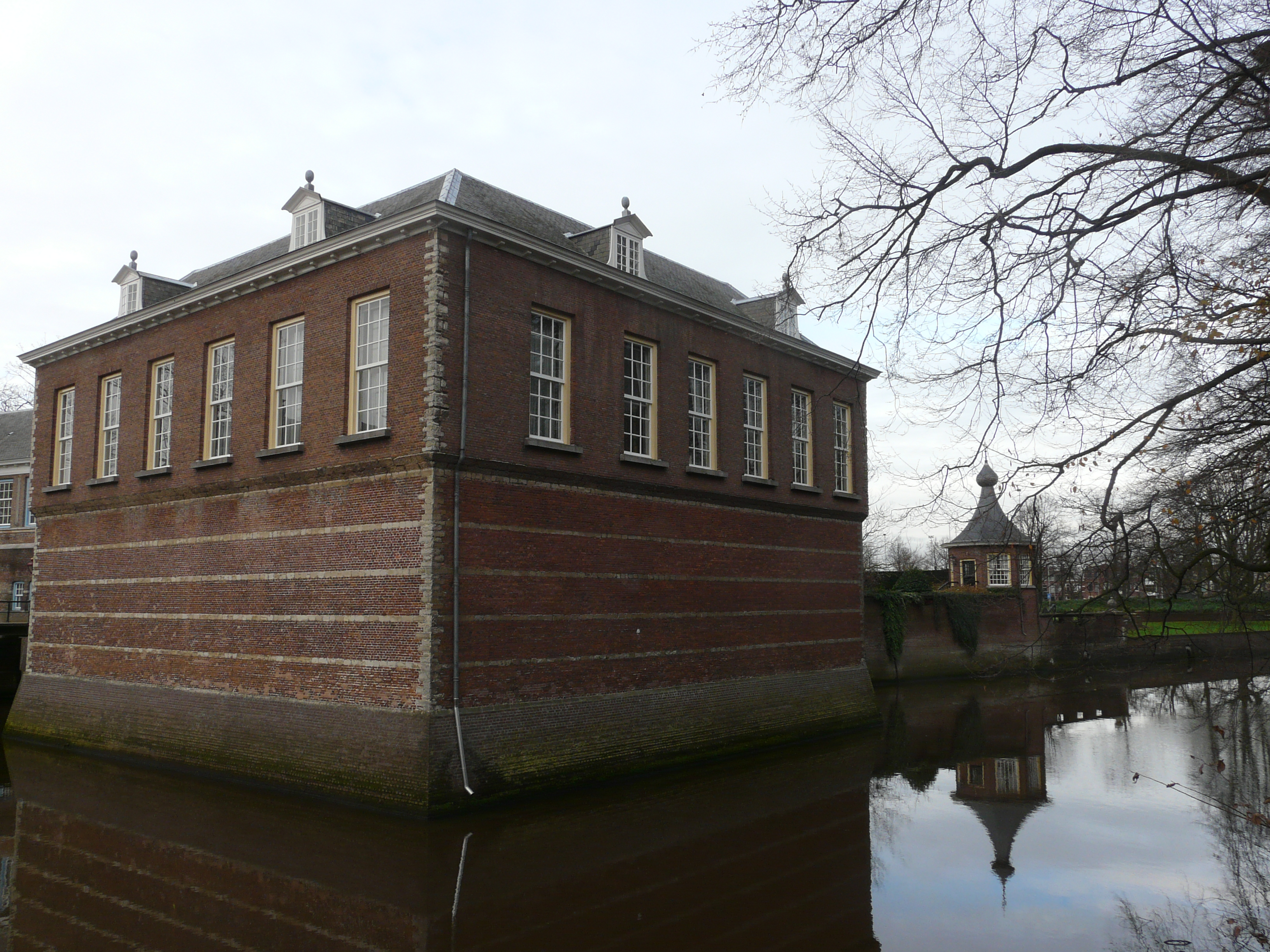
Blokhuis

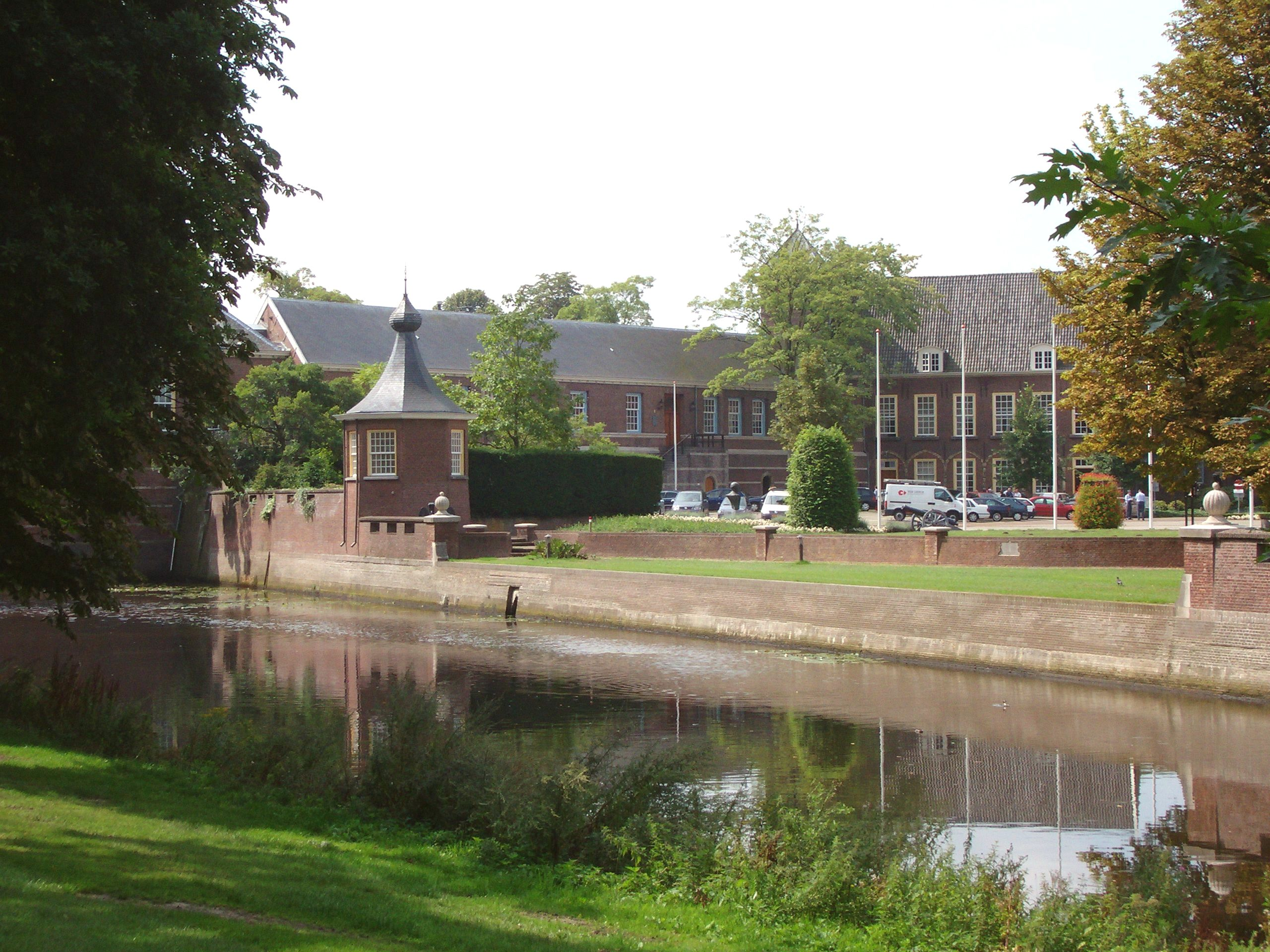
Castle of Breda

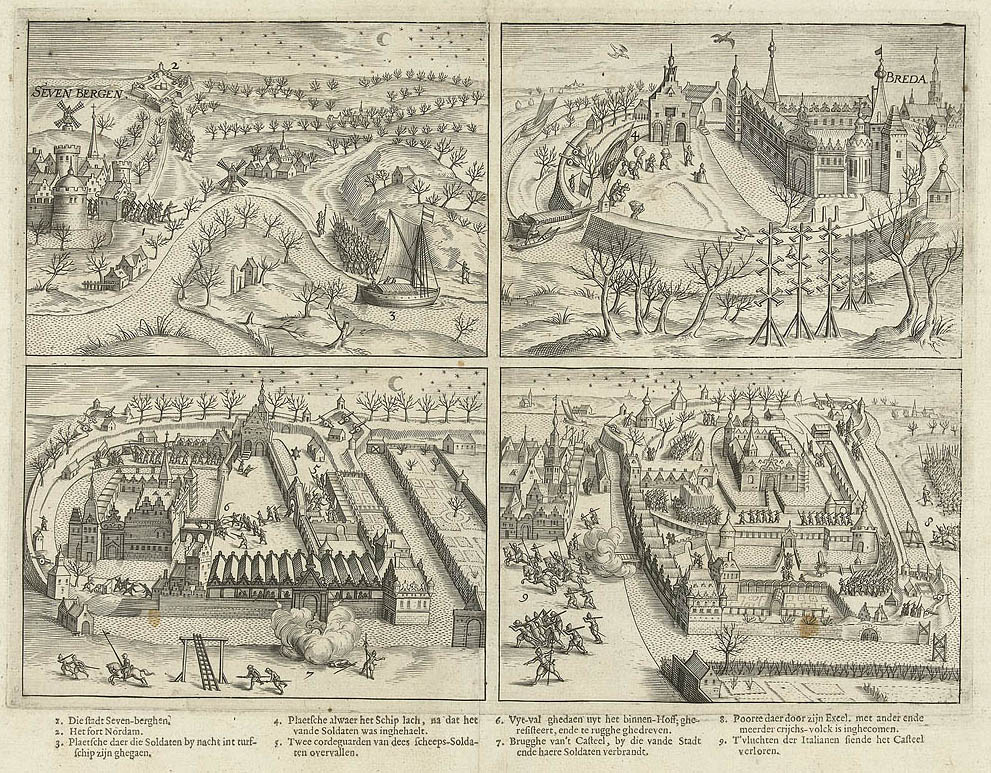
Capture of Breda castle in 1590

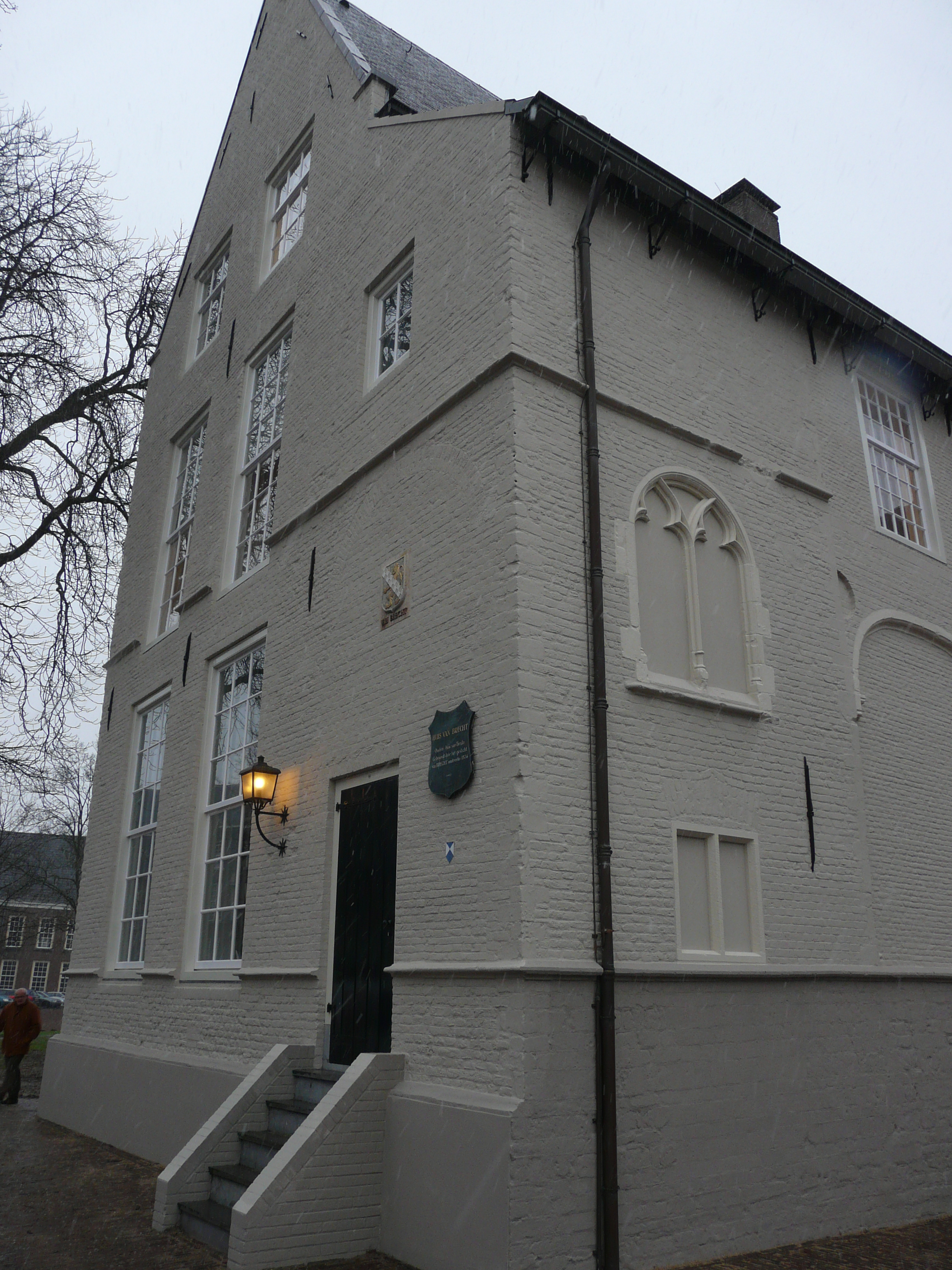
House of Brecht

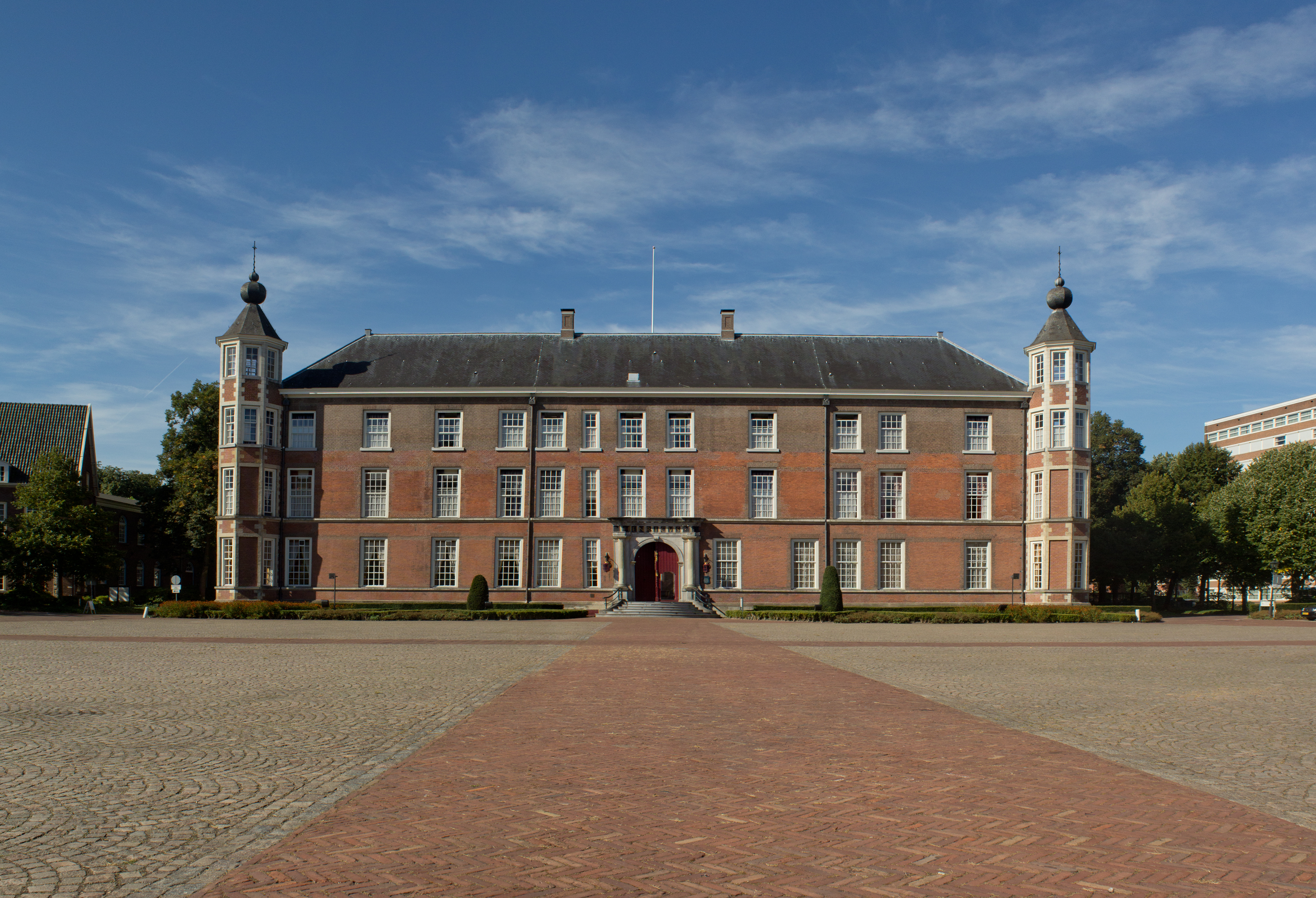
The Front of the castle

== See also ==
- List of castles in the Netherlands
