= Philippe de Courcillon =

French officer and author (1638–1720)

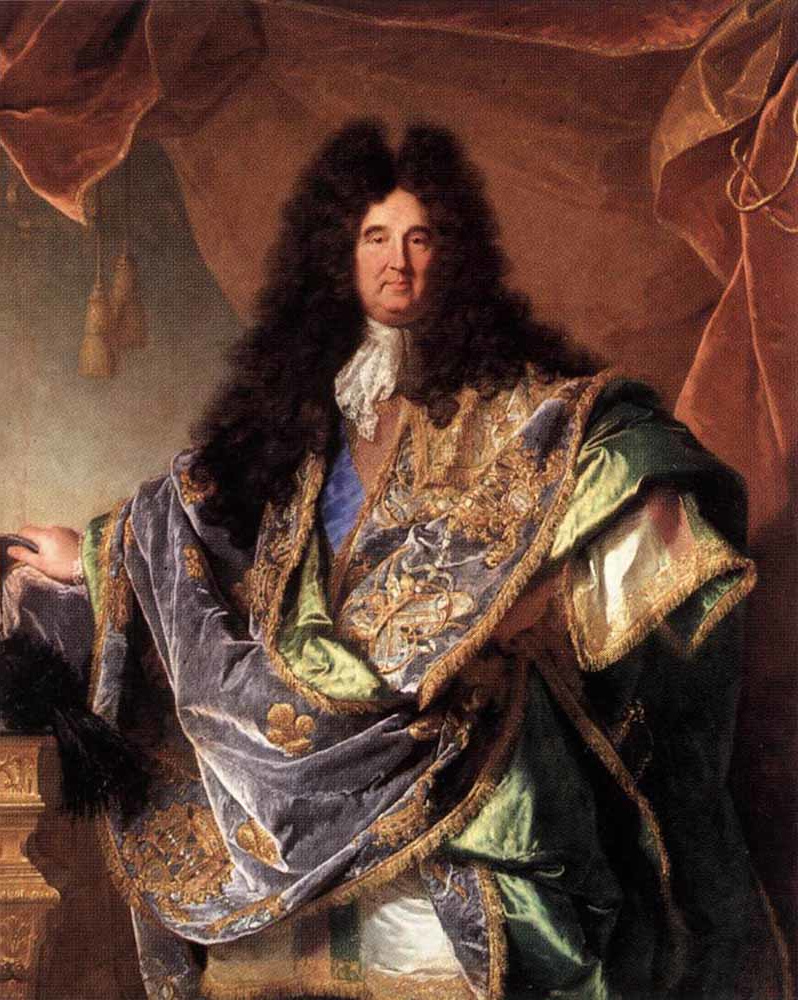
Portrait of Philippe de Courcillon by Hyacinthe Rigaud Signature Philippe de Courcillon de Dangeau (1638–1720)

Philippe de Courcillon, Marquis de Dangeau (21 September 1638 in Dangeau, Chartres – 9 September 1720 in Paris) was a French officer and author.

Born in Dangeau, he is probably most remembered for keeping a diary from 1684 until the year of his death. These Memoirs, which, as Saint-Simon commented, are "of an insipidity to make you sick", contain many facts about the reign of Louis XIV.

== Biography ==
Brother of Louis de Courcillon de Dangeau, he was born into a Calvinist family but converted very early in his life to Catholicism. He first gained repute for his skill at playing cards, to the extent that "jouer à la Dangeau" became an expression in the language of the time and he attracted the attention of Louis XIV. In 1665, he was named colonel of the king's regiment, and accompanied him as an aide de camp in all of his campaigns. He became, in 1667, governor of Touraine and undertook several diplomatic missions to Trier, Mainz and Modena.

A patron of men of letters, he became friends with Nicolas Boileau-Despréaux, who dedicated his Satire on the Nobility to him. Jean de La Bruyère depicted him in his Les Caractères through the traits of "Pamphile".

He was elected a member of the Académie française on 11 January 1668, despite not having published anything, and in 1704 he became an honorary member of the Académie des sciences, of which he became president for a year in 1706 before being replaced by Jean-Paul Bignon.

From 1684 to 1720, he kept a journal on daily life at the court of Versailles. Extracts from it were published by Voltaire in 1770, by Madame de Genlis in 1817 and by Pierre-Édouard Lémontey in 1818. It was whilst writing notes on these memoirs that Saint-Simon undertook to write his own Mémoires. The 19 volumes of the complete edition of Journal de la cour de Louis XIV appeared for the first time between 1854 and 1860.

In 1686, Philippe de Courcillon married his second wife Sophia Maria Wilhelmina von Löwenstein-Wertheim-Rochefort (1664, Wertheim – 1736, Paris), at Versailles. She was the daughter of Ferdinand Karl, Count of Löwenstein-Wertheim-Rochefort (1616–1672) and his wife Countess Anna Maria of Fürstenberg (1634–1705). Together they had at least one son, also called Philippe de Courcillon, who fought at the Battle of Malplaquet (during the War of the Spanish Succession) on 11 September 1709.

== Anecdote ==
Dangeau willingly lent his pen to the King and his entourage. The abbé de Choisy relates a time when Louis XIV asked him to compose his letters to Louise de la Vallière, and she asked him to perform the same service to reply to the King. The abbé relates the epilogue: 'He thus created the letters and their responses; and that lasted for a year, until La Vallière, pouring out her heart, confessed to the King, who it was that was freely lending her so much of her wit, the best part of which she owed to their mutual confidant, whose discretion they admired. The King, on his part confessed that he had had the same idea.' In his "Siècle de Louis XIV" Voltaire relates precisely the same story about the King and his sister-in-law, Princess Henrietta of England.

== Family and issue ==
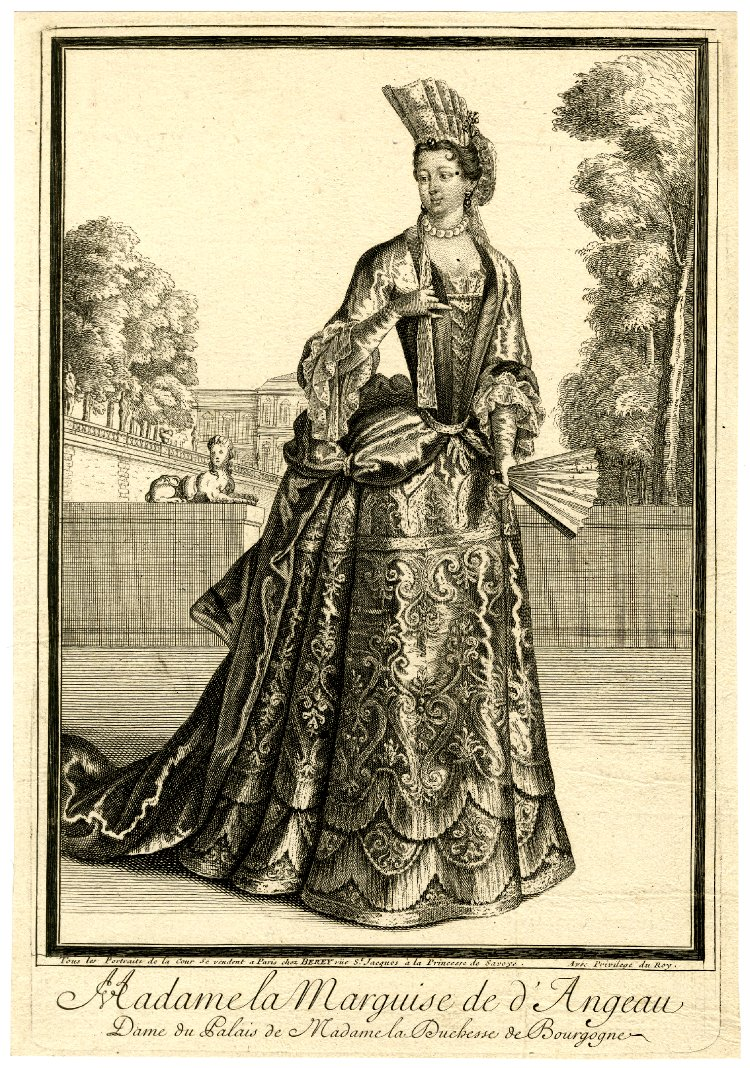
His second wife Sophia Maria Wilhelmina von Löwenstein-Wertheim-Rochefort, Dame du Palais to Madame la duchesse de Bourgogne.

- First wife: Anne Françoise Morin married 11 May 1670 and had one daughter Marie Anne Jeanne de Courcillon who married Honoré Charles d'Albert de Luynes and were the parents of Charles Louis d'Albert de Luynes; present Duke of Luynes are descendants of Philippe.
- Second wife: Princess Sophia Maria Wilhelmine zu Löwenstein-Wertheim-Rochefort' married at Versailles on 26 March 1686 and had one son Philippe Egon de Courcillon' who married Françoise de Pompadour and had a daughter Marie Sophie de Courcillon; Marie Sophie was the wife of Charles François d'Albert d'Ailly then Hercule Meriadec de Rohan, Duke of Rohan-Rohan; no issue.
