= Congress of Breda =

Peace negotiations between Great Britain and France

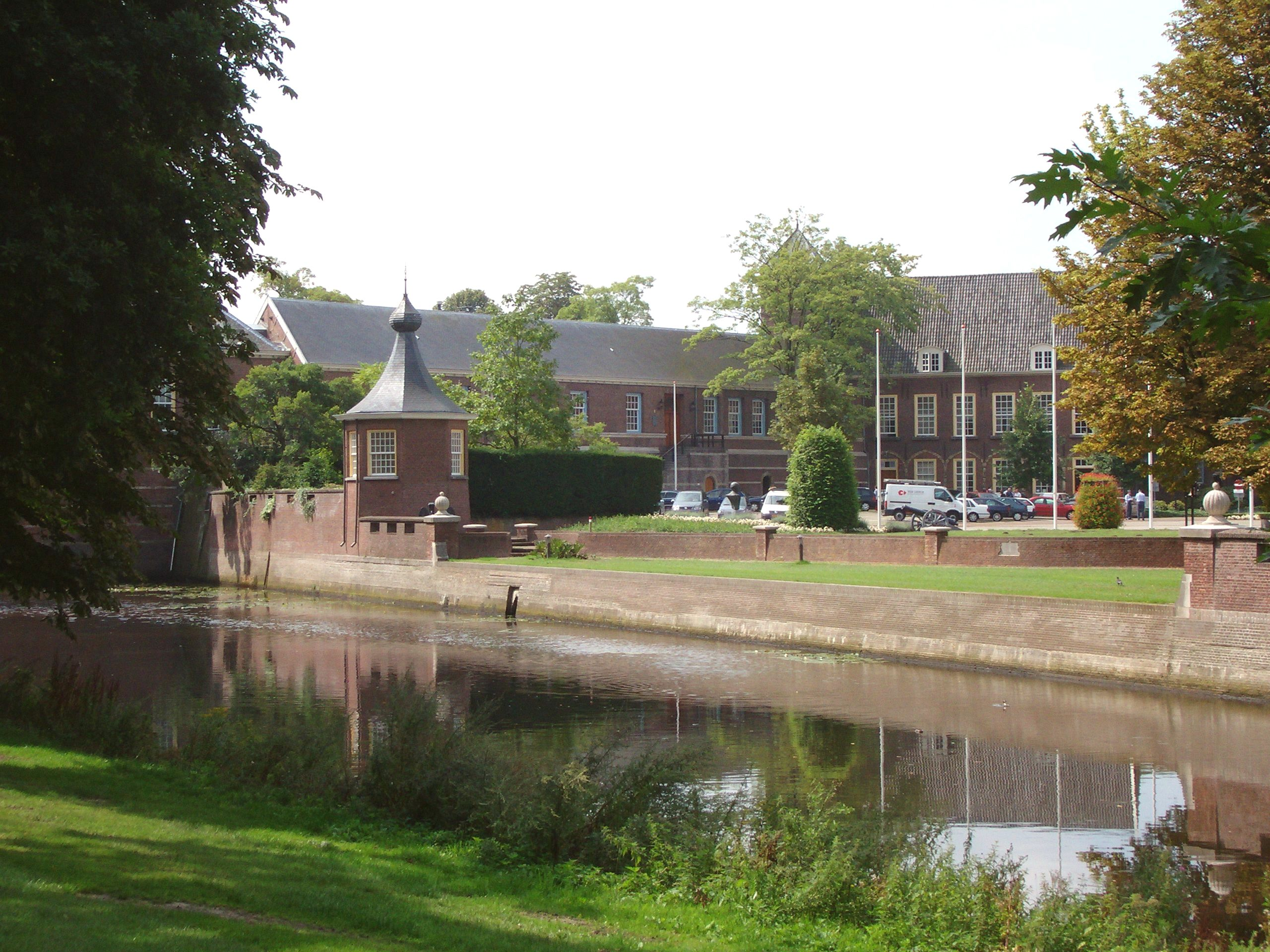
- Breda Castle, used by the British delegation
- Context: Britain and France agree peace terms for the subsequent 1748 Treaty of Aix-la-Chapelle, ending the 1740-1748 War of the Austrian Succession
- Location: Breda, Dutch Republic
- Negotiators: Marquis de Puisieux; Earl of Sandwich
- Parties: France; Great Britain

The Congress of Breda, also known as the Breda peace talks, were a series of bilateral negotiations between Great Britain and France, held in the Dutch city of Breda from 1746 to 1748. The discussions led to the agreement of terms that later became the basis of the 1748 Treaty of Aix-la-Chapelle.

By 1746, the War of the Austrian Succession had effectively become a proxy contest between Britain and France, with French victories in Flanders offset by British naval success. Both sides were concerned by the financial costs, although the French position was significantly worse, with the Royal Navy blockade causing severe food shortages. The intention was to agree terms between France and Britain and end the war by presenting them to the other parties, who were not consulted.

The British deliberately extended discussions, hoping to improve their position, but defeat at Lauffeld in July 1747 and the loss of Bergen op Zoom in September led them to agree terms. These were imposed by France and Britain on their allies at Aix-la-Chapelle with minimal consultation.

In the long-term, it marked the point at which the Austrian Habsburg monarchy began moving closer to France, after over 300 years where conflict between them was the dominant theme of European politics.

== Background ==
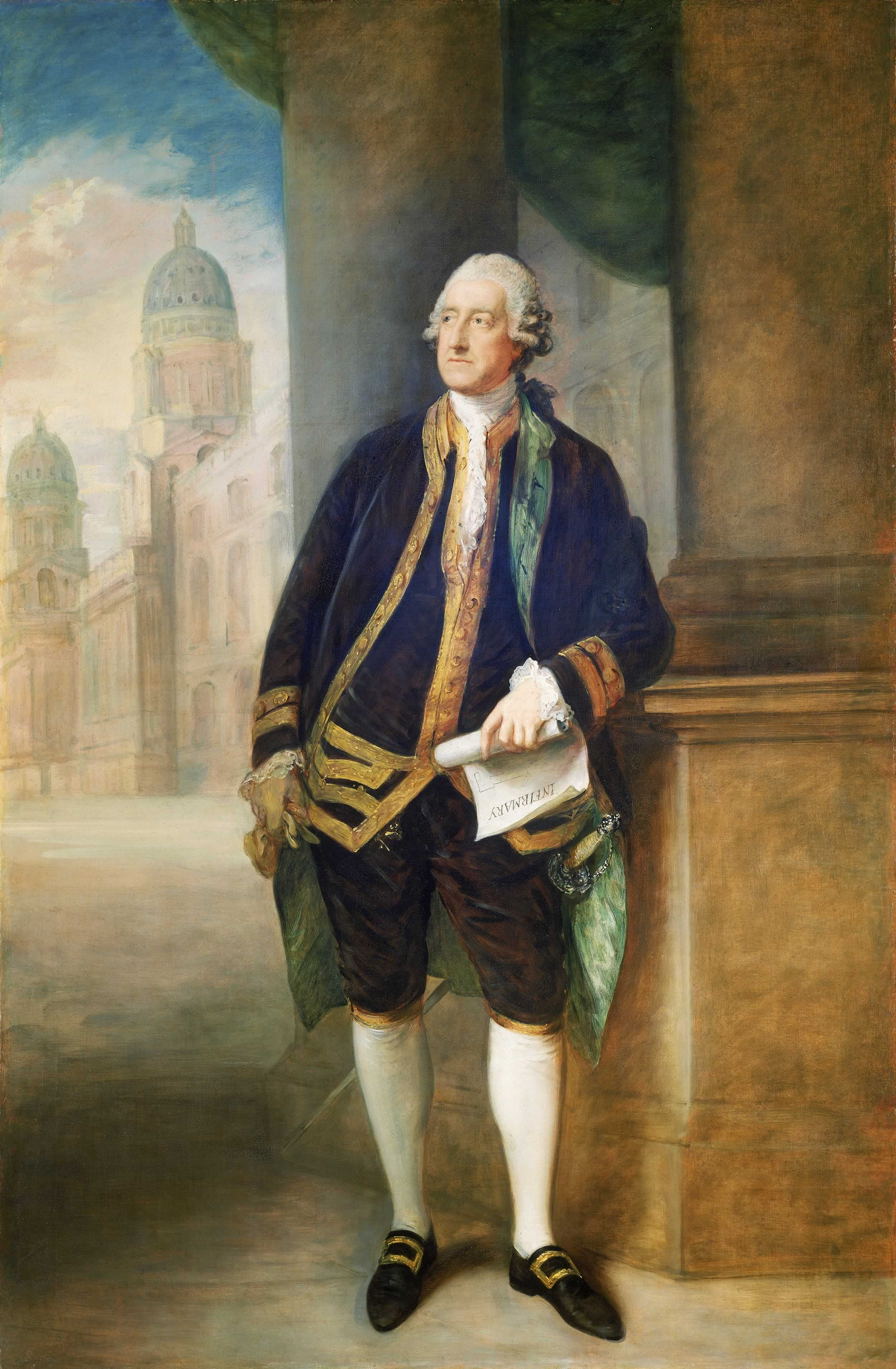
Lord Sandwich the chief British negotiator for much of the talks. A 1783 portrait by Thomas Gainsborough.

When the War of the Austrian Succession began in 1740, Britain was focused on the 1739-1748 War of Jenkins' Ear with Spain; fought mostly in the Caribbean, by the end of 1742, this had largely reached stalemate. France declared war on Britain in March 1744, while Spain joined the conflict in Europe, hoping to regain possessions in Northern Italy lost to Austria and Sardinia in 1713. With the help of British subsidies, they repulsed Spanish troops from Northern Italy in late 1746; France was unable to continue funding Spain, while Maria_Theresa of Austria wanted peace in order to restructure her administration.

Despite the victories of Maurice_de_Saxe in Flanders, the British naval blockade was strangling French trade, while their own had recovered from the post 1739 decline and was expanding once again. This negated a key French objective of reducing the post-1713 expansion of British commercial strength, which they viewed as a threat to the European balance of power. Declaring war on the Dutch Republic made the immediate situation worse, since the neutral Dutch had previously been the main carriers of French imports and exports. By 1747, the French financial system was on the verge of collapse, accompanied by severe food shortages.

The Congress was an attempt to reach agreement between the two main protagonists and end the war but doing so was delayed by internal debates within the British government. They were also finding the financial burden hard to sustain, but the pro-war party led by the Duke of Newcastle argued Dutch support provided an opportunity to recover the Austrian Netherlands. Instead, it revealed the extent of their decline since 1713 while hopes of building an alliance with Spain after the death of Philip V in July 1746 also proved fruitless.

== Congress ==
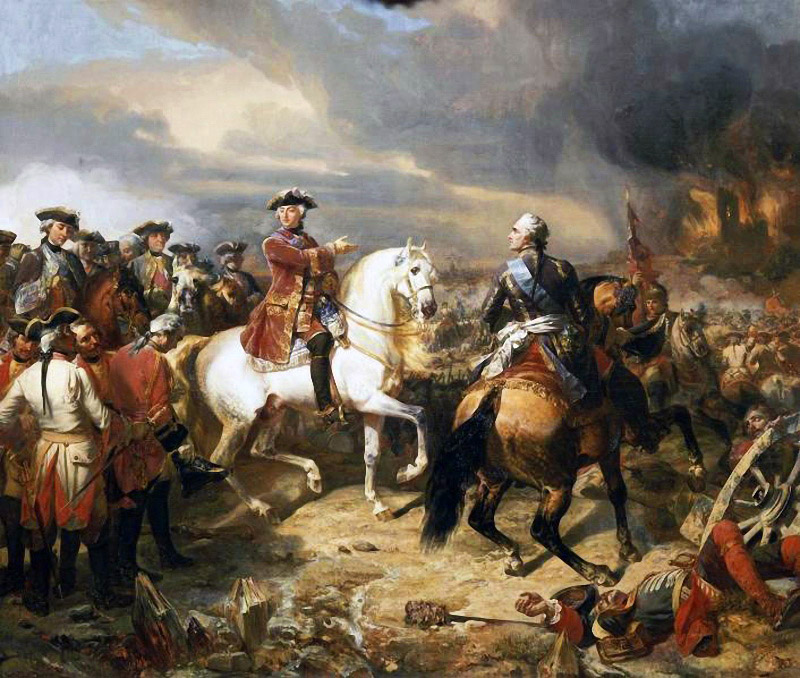
The Battle of Lauffeld by Auguste Couder, 1836. French victory at Lauffeld in July 1747 ended Allies° hopes of regaining Flanders

Discussions began in August 1746, led by John Montagu, 4th Earl of Sandwich and the Louis Philogène Brûlart, vicomte de Puisieulx. Sandwich and the British delegation were based near Breda Castle lent to them by William IV, Prince of Orange. Negotiations proceeded slowly, since the British wanted to extend discussions long enough for their position in Flanders to improve. On the other side, France wanted to reach agreement immediately, the terms including making the Low Countries neutral territory in future conflicts; these were drawn up by Gabriel de Mably, who shortly afterwards fell from favour.

Unsatisfied by his performance, the French recalled Puisieux and replaced him, giving Sandwich an opportunity to delay by demanding his replacement prove his accreditation. There were further delays when a Spanish delegate turned up, claiming to represent Ferdinand VI, the new king of Spain. The British were kept informed of French negotiating strategy, as letters to the French delegates were intercepted and copied by postmasters in British pay.

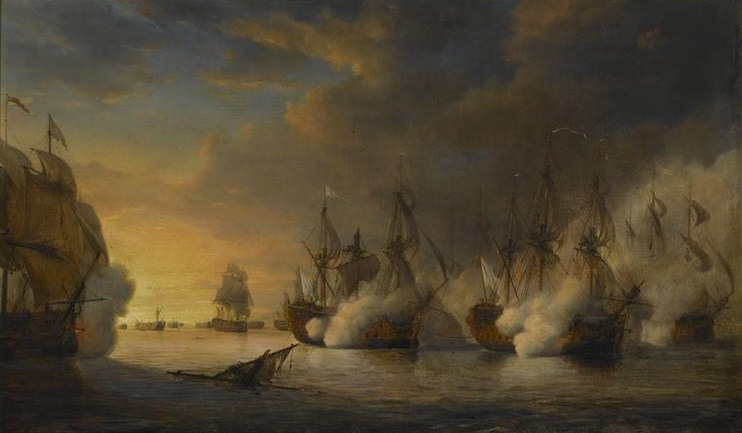
Second Cape Finisterre, October 1747; defeat forced France to suspend naval operations, putting their entire colonial empire in jeopardy

Sandwich also played a key role in the coup that brought William of Orange to power in the Netherlands. Previously neutral, Newcastle viewed Dutch entry into the war as a way to boost the anti-French coalition in Flanders but it soon proved otherwise. The Dutch required massive British financial support, while the Allied position further deteriorated with defeat at Lauffeld in July and the loss of Bergen op Zoom in September. Newcastle berated himself for his "ignorance, obstinacy and credulity" and fully expected to be forced from office as a result.

Despite previously insisting negotiations must include all parties, the British delegation now agreed to settle terms with France prior to confirmation by their allies. They arguably underestimated the impact of victory at Second Cape Finisterre in October, which effectively ended French naval operations and put their entire colonial empire at risk. The North American fortress of Louisbourg, captured by Britain in 1745, was exchanged for Madras, India, captured by France in 1746; France agreed to withdraw from the Low Countries, while both parties recognised Prussian control of Silesia.

== Aftermath ==
A Congress was held at Aix-la-Chapelle for all belligerents to confirm terms agreed between Britain and France at Breda. Peace was formally concluded with the 1748 Treaty of Aix-la-Chapelle. Maria Theresa was outraged at British acceptance of the Prussian conquest of Silesia without any Austrians being present, a major element in the breakdown of the Anglo-Austrian Alliance.

Sandwich was rewarded by being made First Lord of the Admiralty, although both he and Newcastle were attacked for giving up Louisbourg so easily. In France, there was enormous disquiet about returning their territorial gains in Flanders, which cost so much, in return for so little. The phrase "as stupid as the Peace" became popular to express contempt for the terms agreed at Breda and Aix-la-Chapelle. In general, the Treaty satisfied no one and failed to resolve the issues that led to war in 1740.

== Sources ==
- Baker-Smith, Veronica (2010). Royal Discord: The Family of George II. Athena Press. ISBN 978-1847489296.
- Black, Jeremy (1999). Britain as a Military Power, 1688-1815. Routledge. ISBN 978-1-85728-772-1.
- Browning, Reed (1975). The Duke of Newcastle. Yale University. ISBN 9780300017465.
- Lieber, Francis (1836). Encyclopædia Americana: Volume VIII. Deliver, Thomas & Co.
- McKay, Derek (1983). The Rise of the Great Powers 1648–1815. Routledge. ISBN 978-0582485549.
- McLynn, Frank (2008). 1759: The Year Britain Became Master of the World. Vintage. ISBN 978-0099526391.
- Rodger, NAM (2004). Montagu, John, fourth earl of Sandwich (2008 ed.). Oxford DNB.
- Rodger, NAM (1993). The Insatiable Earl: A Life of John Montagu, Fourth Earl of Sandwich, 1718-1792. Harper Collins. ISBN 978-0099526391.
- Scott, Hamish (2015). The Birth of a Great Power System, 1740-1815. Routledge. ISBN 978-1138134232.
- Simms, Brendan; Three Victories and a Defeat: The Rise and Fall of the First British Empire. Penguin Books, 2008.
