= Henri Charles Arnauld de Pomponne =

French diplomat (1669–1756)

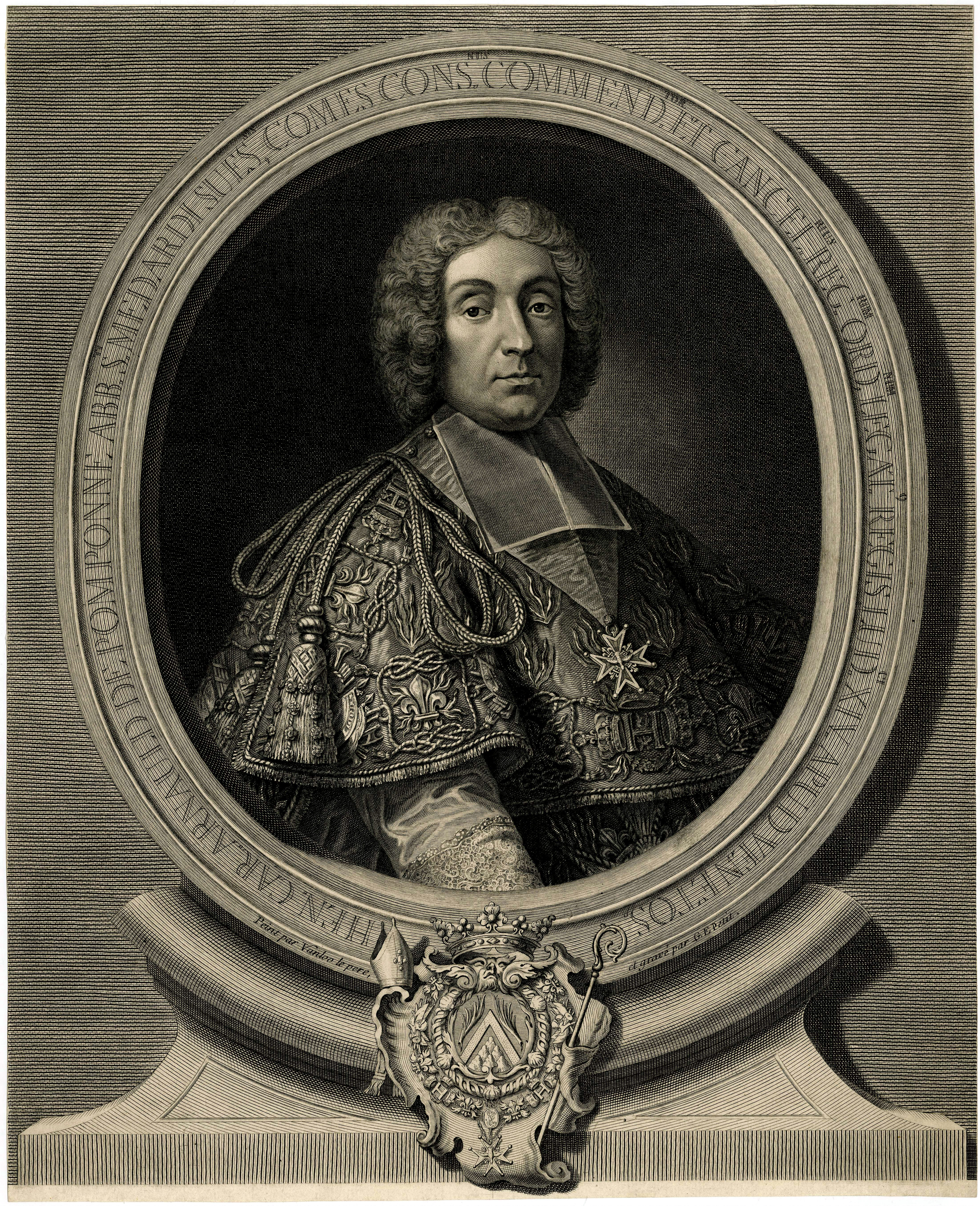
L'abbé de Pomponne.

Abbot Henri Charles Arnauld de Pomponne (1669, The Hague – 1756) was a French ecclesiastic and diplomat.

He was the third son of Simon Arnauld de Pomponne, Secretary of State for Foreign Affairs, and was born at La Haye (The Hague), where his father was ambassador. Commendatory abbot to the royal abbey of Saint-Médard at Soissons and at Saint-Maixent, king's almoner, and conseiller d'État, he was chancellor and Garde des Sceaux of the Ordre du Saint-Esprit from 1716 to 1756. In the 1720s he was a member of the Club de l'Entresol, an early modern think tank in Paris. In 1743 he was elected an honorary member of the Académie des inscriptions et belles-lettres.

Brother in law of Torcy, then Secretary of State for Foreign Affairs, abbot de Pomponne was made French ambassador to the Republic of Venice during the War of the Spanish Succession. He managed to seize the papers of a secretary to a Piedmont-Savoy diplomat, which were published in Switzerland to expose the plots of Louis XIV's enemies.

As abbot of Saint-Médard, he held a château at Vic-sur-Aisne. In 1732, he founded at Nogent-sur-Marne a company of archers which codified the rules of chivalry and still exists.
