= François Dominique de Barberie de Saint-Contest =

French foreign minister

François Dominique de Barberie de Saint-Contest (26 June 1701 – 14 July 1754) was a French Foreign Minister.

Born into an old Norman family that had helped keep the city of Caen allied to Louis XIII, in 1620, François-Dominique, son of Councilor of State-Claude Dominique Barberie de Saint Contest was named King's attorney at the Chatelet in Paris, 27 November 1721, and advisor to Parliament (1724), master of requests, advisor to the Hotel de Ville (1728), steward of Beam (1737), Caen (1739) and Dijon, from 1740 to 1749. In the 1720s he was a member of the Club de l'Entresol, an early modern think tank, together with his father.

On 15 July 1749, he was appointed as Ambassador of France in Switzerland, and like Champeaux, resident in France to Geneva, Switzerland to discuss the contentious issues relating to the territories located in Geneva Gex.

Appointed Ambassador of France to Holland, in the winter 1749, he went to The Hague, in September the following year. He soon returned from his embassy at the request of the Marquise de Pompadour, who appointed him, on 11 September 1751, Secretary of State for Foreign Affairs, on the resignation the Marquis de Puisieux.

In this department, he worked to set up against Austria, Russia and England, an alliance comprising France, Spain, Sweden, Denmark, Prussia and Turkey. He also blamed later for not maintaining the system, with Marquise de Pompadour, the Marshal de Noailles, the Marquis de Saint-Severin.

In the twilight of his life, he was made provost and master of ceremonies of the king's orders, on 12 May 1754.

== Family ==
He married, on 27 September 1735, Monique Jeanne, who had a salon in Dijon.

Among their children there:

- Margaret Mary-Louise-Victoire Barberie de Saint Contest (born 13 March 1738), married
  - 6 June 1753 to Louis-Henri-Felix du Plessis-Châtillon (1726–1754), Count Châteaumeillan
  - 18 May 1756 Charles-Louis-Joseph-Alexandre de Canouville, Marquis of Raffetot.
- Henri-Louis de Barberie de Saint Contest (1708–1772), will be master of requests and steward Champagne, and the initiator of the lovely promenade known sister's name "during Ormesson" in Châlons-en-Champagne.

== Bibliography ==
- Biographie universelle, ancienne et moderne, ou Histoire, par ordre alphabétique, de la vie publique et privée de tous les hommes qui se sont fait remarquer par leurs écrits, leurs actions, leurs talents, leurs vertus ou leurs crimes, [...], Joseph Fr Michaud, Louis Gabriel Michaud, Paris, 1825, vol. 38, p. 534-536
- Biographie universelle ancienne et moderne: histoire par ordre alphabétique de la vie publique et privée de tous les hommes... published at direction of M. Michaud, Paris, vol. 37, p. 265-266

Political offices
Preceded by Louis Philogène Brûlart, vicomte de Puisieulx	Foreign Minister of France; 11 September 1751 – 24 July 1754	Succeeded by Antoine Louis Rouillé
