= François-Timoléon de Choisy =

French abbé and writer (1644–1724)

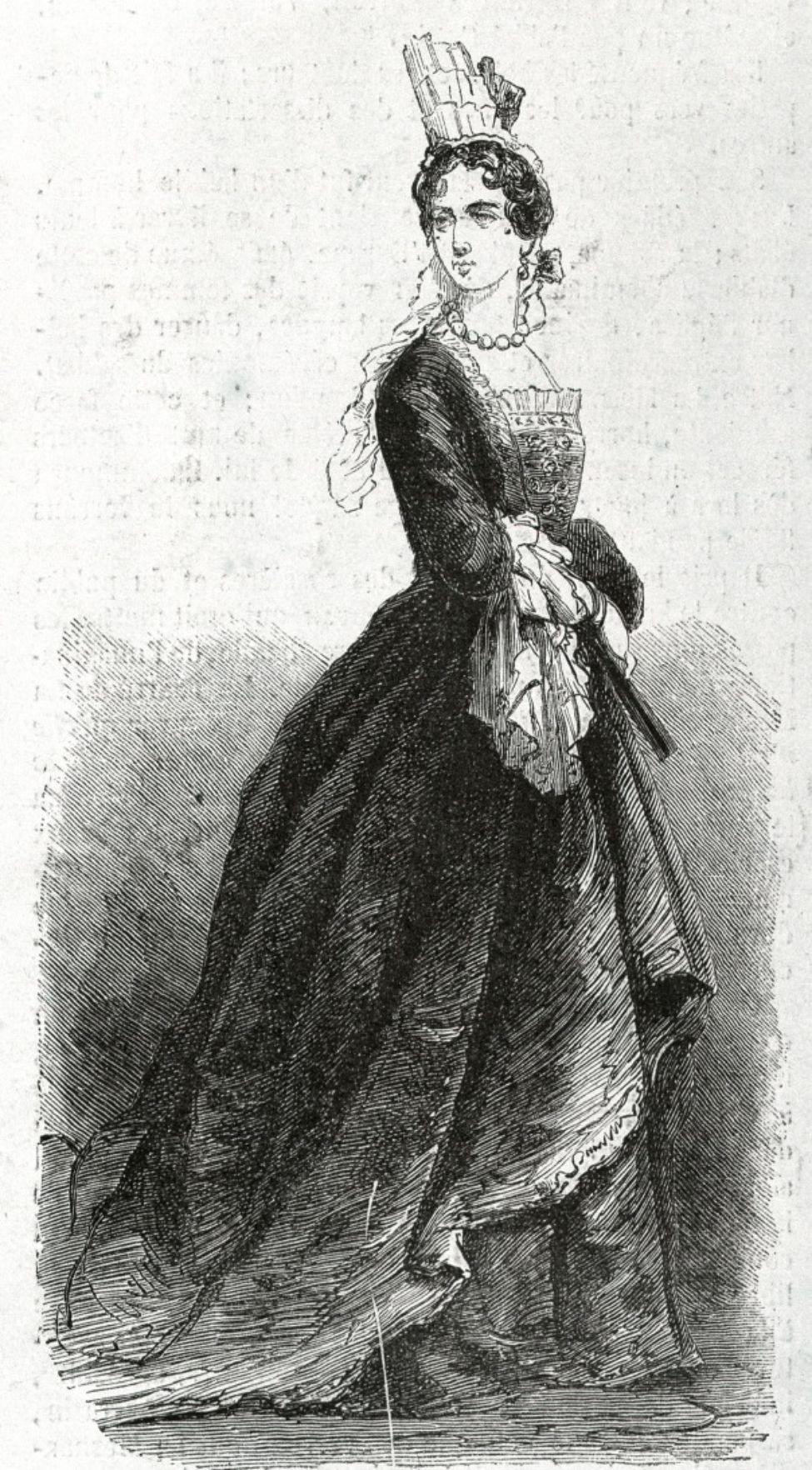
- Magazine illustration from 1855 depicting De Choisy in women's clothing
- Born: 16 August 1644; Paris, Kingdom of France
- Died: 2 October 1724 (aged 80); France
- Occupations: Clergyman; writer; memoirist; traveller
- Organization: Académie Française
- Known for: Autobiographical writings, travel literature, ecclesiastical history
- Notable work: Mémoires
- Title: Abbé

François-Timoléon de Choisy (French: [ʃwazi]; 16 August 1644 – 2 October 1724) was a French abbé, writer, and member of the Académie Française. He is known for his memoirs, historical and religious writings, and travel accounts. His posthumously published autobiographical writings describe frequent use of women's clothing in both private and public life, a subject of later scholarly debate.

== Biography ==
=== Early life and upbringing ===
De Choisy was born in Paris. His father was attached to the household of the Duke of Orléans, while his mother, who was on close terms with Anne of Austria, was regularly invited to amuse Louis XIV. According to De Choisy's memoirs, his mother dressed him in girls' clothing until he was eighteen, after which he briefly wore male clothing before returning to women's dress, reportedly on the advice of Madame de La Fayette.

Following his mother's death, he inherited a substantial sum, which allowed him to pursue a life without regular employment. He wrote that he wore elaborate women's clothing until he was publicly criticised by the duc de Montausier. He then withdrew to the provinces, where his memoirs describe continued use of women's dress in connection with various social situations.

The reliability of these accounts has been questioned. Historian Paul Scott of the University of Kansas noted that "if you regard it [the memoir] with any scrutiny, there are implausibilities, contradictions, anachronisms and no contemporary corroboration whatsoever."

=== Religious life and travels ===
De Choisy was made an abbé in childhood. Financial difficulties later led him to reside at his benefice in Sainte-Seine, in Burgundy, where he became acquainted with Bussy-Rabutin.

In 1676, he travelled to Rome as part of the entourage of the cardinal de Bouillon. He later wrote that a serious illness led to a personal religious conversion.

In 1685, he accompanied the Chevalier de Chaumont on a diplomatic mission to the Kingdom of Siam.

=== Académie Française ===
De Choisy was admitted to the Académie Française on 24 July 1687.

== Works ==
De Choisy wrote a number of historical and religious works, of which the most notable are the following:

- Quatre dialogues sur l'immortalité de l'âme ... (1684), written with the Abbé Dangeau and explaining their conversion.
- Histoire de l'Eglise (11 vols., 1703–1723)

De Choisy is remembered for his gossiping Mémoires (1727), which contains detailed portraits of his contemporaries, although there is some question about its historical accuracy.

The Mémoires passed through many editions, and were edited in 1868 by M. de Lescure. Some admirable letters of de Choisy are included in the correspondence of Bussy-Rabutin. De Choisy is said to have burnt some of their indiscreet revelations, but left a considerable quantity of unpublished manuscripts. Part of this material was surreptitiously used in an anonymous Histoire de madame la comtesse de Barres (Antwerp, 1735) and again with much editing in the Vie de M. l'abbé de Choisy (Lausanne and Geneva, 1742), ascribed by Paul Lacroix to Lenglet Dufresnoy; the text was finally edited (1870) by Lacroix as Aventures de l'abbé de Choisy. See also Sainte-Beuve, Causeries du lundi, vol. iii.

== Influence ==
The Scottish philosopher David Hume (1711–1776) had de Choisy's Mémoires and account of Siam in his library.
