= Pierre-Joseph Alary =

French ecclesiastic and writer (1689–1770)

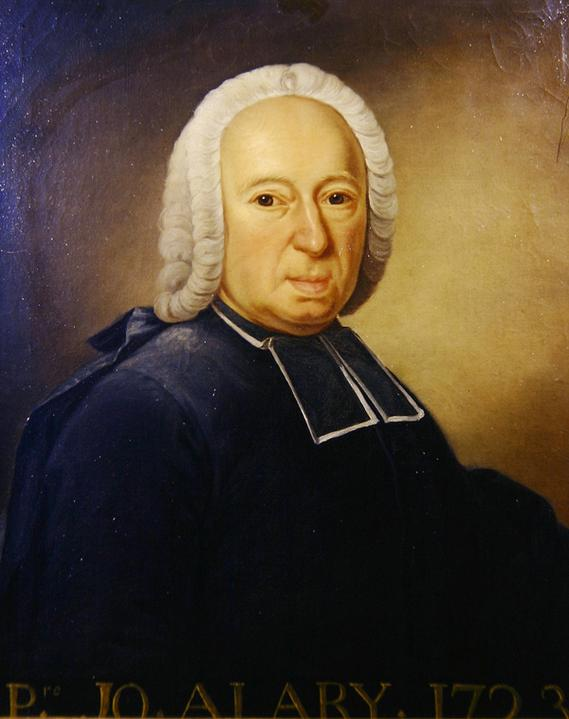
Pierre-Joseph Alary.

Pierre-Joseph Alary (19 March 1689 in Paris – 15 December 1770) was a French ecclesiastic and writer.

Prior of Gournay-sur-Marne and sous-précepteur to Louis XV, he attended the salon of Madame de Lambert, was elected to the Académie française in 1723 and was the main founder of the Club de l'Entresol, an early modern think tank that operated until 1731.

Bachaumont commented on Alary's election to the Académie française:

He was an apothecary's son, who had managed to reach his fortune by intrigues. It is not well known what title he has to his seat in the sanctuary of the muses, for no work by him is known. [...] Even so, he speaks beautifully, is a handsome man and very-well-thought-of amongst women; this, for more than one of his brother-academicians, took the place of literary merit.

Alary's successor in the Académie, Gabriel-Henri Gaillard, gave a completely different portrait:

This modest scholar searched for obscurity as he sought for glory. [...] He recounted much, and one always heard him; he always had philosophy in view, and that he spoke as a man of the world : it was his taste that showed the treasures of study and experience.
