= Louis de Courcillon =

French grammarian (1643–1723)

Louis de Courcillon, known as the abbé de Dangeau (January 1643 – 1 January 1723) was a French churchman and grammarian, best known for being the first to describe the nasal vowels in the French language. Originally a Protestant of Huguenot origin, he converted to Catholicism in 1668 after a trip to Poland. He was a younger brother of Philippe de Courcillon de Dangeau.

== Works ==
- Nouvelle métode de géografie historique pour apprendre facilement et retenir la géografie moderne et l'anciène, l'histoire moderne et l'anciène, le gouvernement des états, les intérêts des princes, leurs généalogies, etc. (1693)
- Essais de grammaire contenus en trois lettres d'un académicien à un autre académicien (1694)
- Tableau des provinces de France, où l'on voit la description et l'histoire de chaque province du royaume (1694)
- Principes du blason en quatorze planches où l'on explique toutes les règles et tous les termes de cete siance (1709)
- Essais de grammaire, qui contiennent : I. un discours sur les voyèles, II. un discours sur les consones, III. une lêtre sur l'ortografe, IV. supplément à la lêtre sur l'ortografe. - Suite des essais de grammaire (1711)
- Réflexions sur la grammaire fransoise (1717)
- Idées nouvèles sur diférantes matières de grammaire (1722)
