= Treaty of Aix-la-Chapelle (1748) =

Treaty ending the War of the Austrian Succession

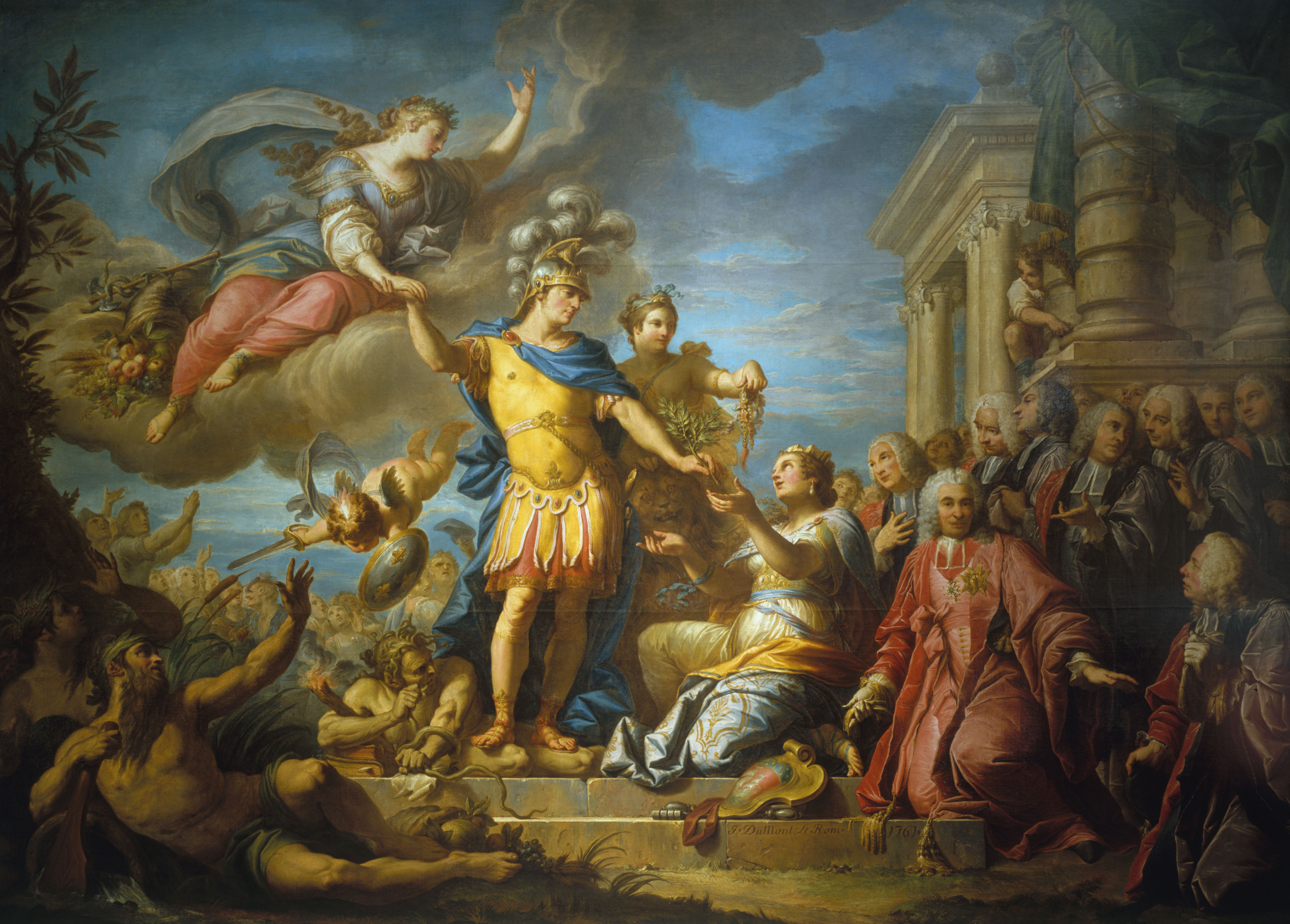
- Celebration of the Peace by Jacques Dumont
- Context: Ends the War of the Austrian Succession
- Signed: 18 October 1748
- Location: Free Imperial City of Aachen, Holy Roman Empire
- Effective: 18 October 1748
- Parties: 18 October 1748; Great Britain; Dutch Republic; France; 4 December 1748; Spain; (Habsburg monarchy) Austria; Sardinia; 21 January 1749; Genoa; Duchy of Modena
- Language: French, Latin

The 1748 Treaty of Aix-la-Chapelle, sometimes called the Treaty of Aachen, ended the War of the Austrian Succession, following a congress assembled on 24 April 1748 at the Free Imperial City of Aachen.

The two main antagonists in the war, Britain and France, opened peace talks in the Dutch city of Breda in 1746. Agreement was delayed by British hopes of improving their position; when this failed to occur, a draft treaty was agreed on 30 April 1748. A final version was signed on 18 October 1748 by Britain, France, and the Dutch Republic.

The terms were then presented to the other belligerents, who could either accept them or continue the war on their own. Austria, Spain, and Sardinia had little choice but to comply, though the terms were favorable for Spain who took land from Austria in Italy, and in defeating the British invasion in South America, were able to renew a monopoly in the supply of slaves to Spanish America.

The treaty largely failed to resolve the issues that caused the war, while most of the signatories were unhappy with the terms. Maria Theresa resented Austria's exclusion from the talks, and blamed Britain for forcing her to accept concessions, while British politicians felt they had received little benefit for the financial subsidies paid to her. These issues, combined with other factors, led to the strategic realignment known as the Diplomatic Revolution, and the outbreak of the Seven Years' War in 1756.

== Background ==
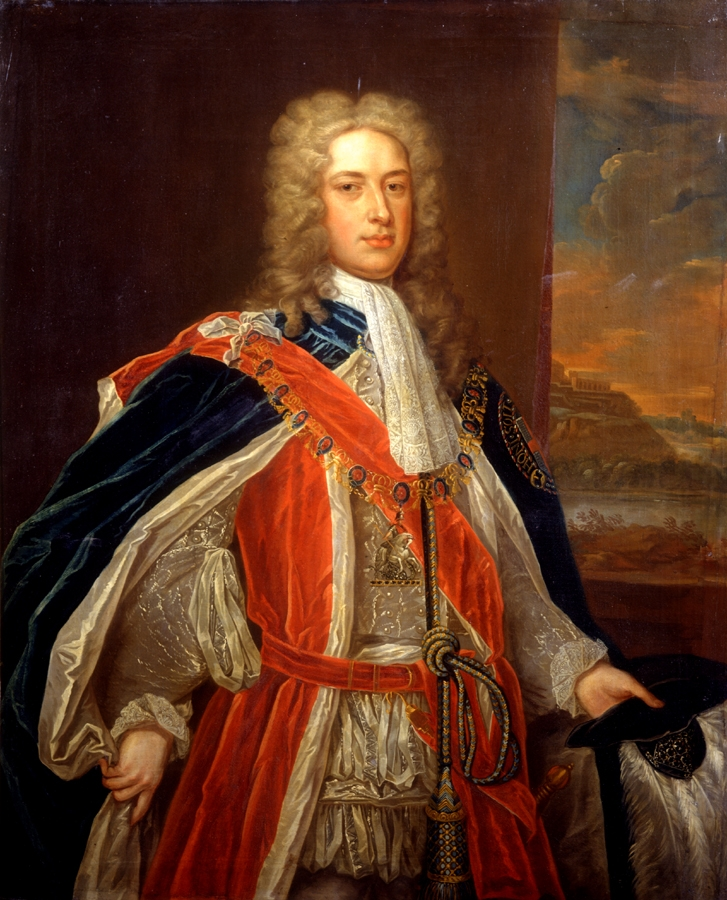
The Duke of Newcastle, who delayed negotiations, hoping to improve the British position

Franco-British negotiations began at Breda in August 1746 but were deliberately delayed by the Duke of Newcastle, who controlled British foreign policy. The death of Philip V of Spain in July 1746 seemed an opportunity to break the Bourbon alliance, while Newcastle hoped the Orangist revolution would revitalise the Dutch war effort, and allow the Allies to recover the Austrian Netherlands. Both assumptions proved incorrect; Spanish policy remained largely unchanged, the Dutch States Army collapsed, and Newcastle later berated himself for his "ignorance, obstinacy, and credulity".

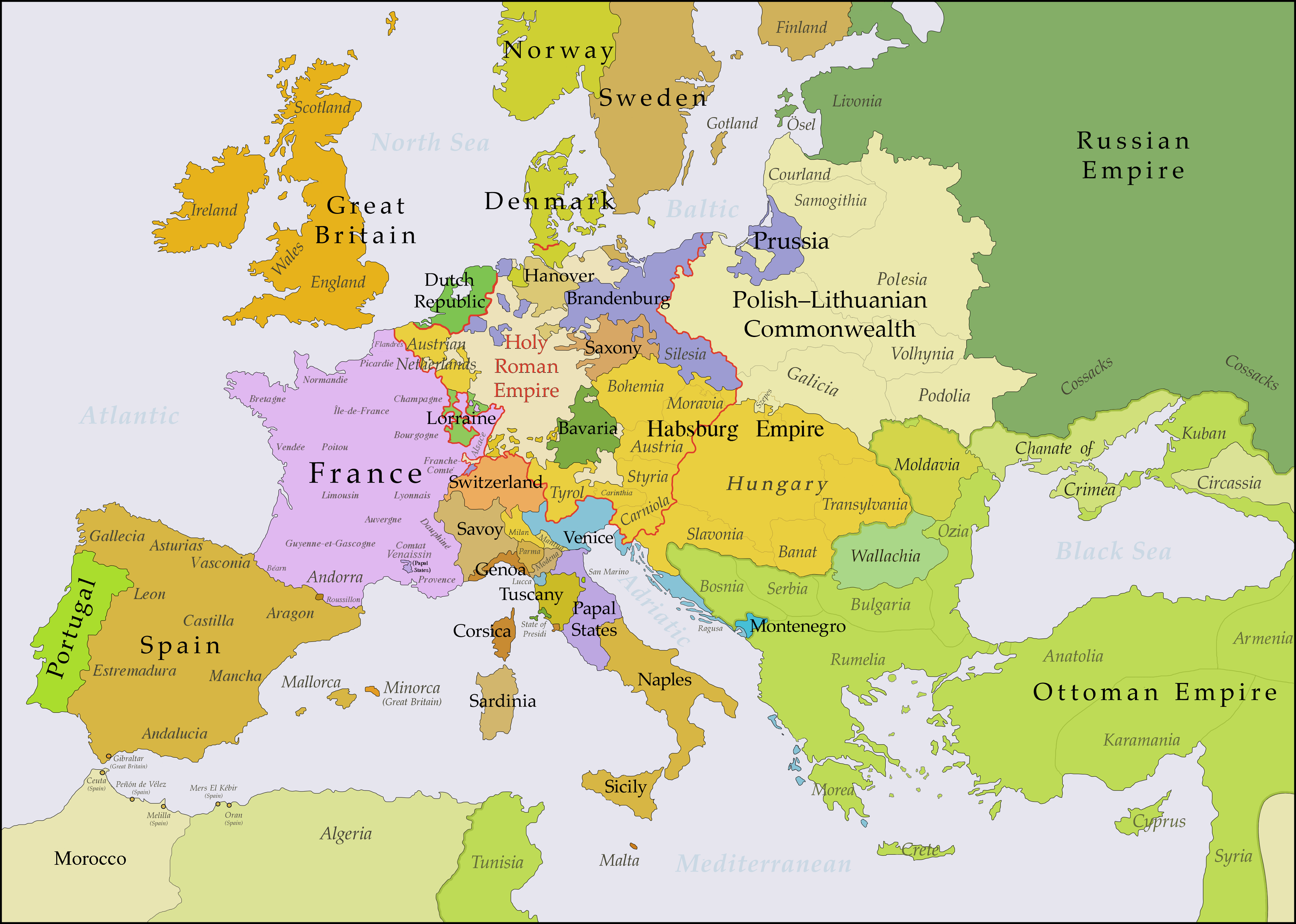
Map of Europe, year 1750.

However, despite French victories in Flanders, the impact of the British naval blockade was such that throughout 1746, Finance Minister Machault repeatedly warned Louis XV of the impending collapse of their financial system. The position became critical after the Second Battle of Cape Finisterre in October 1747, as the French Navy was no longer strong enough to protect their merchant convoys.

Maria Theresa made peace with Bavaria in April 1745, then with Prussia in December; only British financial subsidies kept Austria in the war thereafter. At a conference in December 1747, Austrian ministers agreed 'the worse peace is preferable to starting another campaign', and drew up proposals for ending the stalemate in Italy. They agreed to withdraw Austrian troops from the Duchy of Modena and Republic of Genoa, confirm Spanish control of Naples, and provide territorial concessions that would provide Infante Philip of Spain with an Italian state.

In November, Britain signed a convention with Russia for the supply of troops and in February 1748, a Russian corps of 37,000 arrived in the Rhineland. Lack of progress in Flanders and domestic opposition to the cost of subsidising its allies meant Britain was also ready to end the war. Both France and Britain were prepared to impose terms on their allies if needed, but preferred to avoid dropping them by making a separate peace treaty.

On 30 April 1748, France, Britain, and the Dutch Republic signed a preliminary treaty which included the return of the Austrian Netherlands, the Dutch Barrier forts, Maastricht and Bergen op Zoom. They also guaranteed the Austrian cession of Silesia to Prussia, as well as the Duchies of Parma, and Guastalla to Philip of Spain. Faced with this, Austria, Sardinia, Spain, Modena and Genoa acceded to the treaty in two separate documents finalised on 4 December 1748 and 21 January 1749 respectively.

== Terms ==
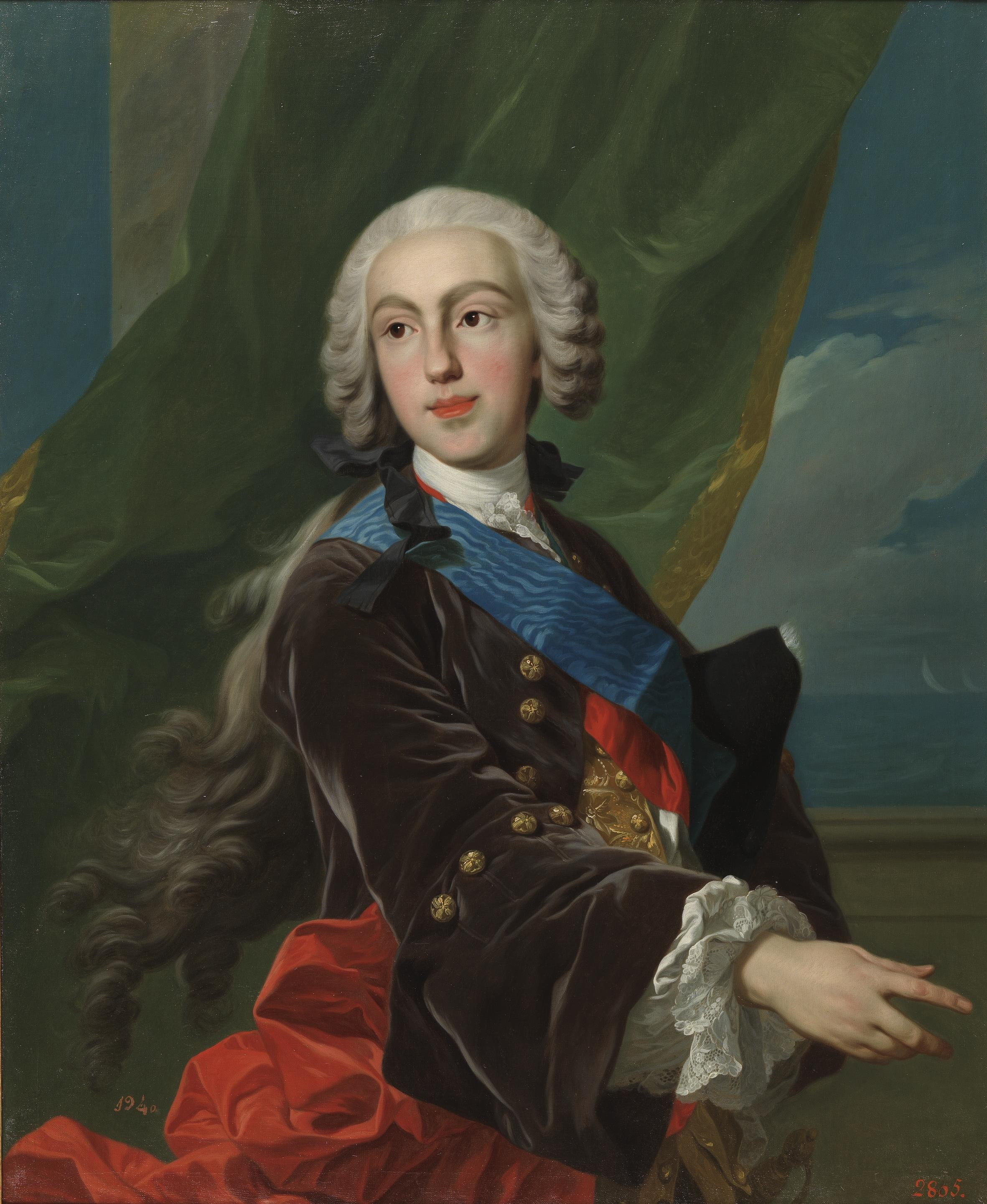
Philip of Spain (1720–1765); Austria ceded him the Duchies of Parma, and Guastalla

These included the following;

1. All signatories accept the Pragmatic Sanction of 1713;
2. Austria recognises the Prussian acquisition of Silesia
3. Austria cedes the Duchies of Parma, Piacenza and Guastalla to Philip of Spain, second eldest son of Philip V of Spain and Elisabeth Farnese;
4. Austria cedes minor territories in Italy to Sardinia, including Vigevano;
5. Austria withdraws from the Duchy of Modena and Republic of Genoa, which regain their independence;
6. France withdraws from the Austrian Netherlands and returns the Dutch Barrier forts, Maastricht and Bergen op Zoom;
7. Britain and France exchange Louisbourg on Île-Royale for Madras in India;
8. Spain renews the Asiento de Negros (a monopoly contract to supply slaves to Spanish America) which was granted to Britain in the 1713 Treaty of Utrecht; Britain subsequently renounced this under the 1750 Treaty of Madrid, in return for £100,000;
9. Commission established to resolve competing claims between French and British colonies in North America. France also agrees to expel the Jacobite Prince of Wales, Charles Edward Stuart.

== Aftermath ==
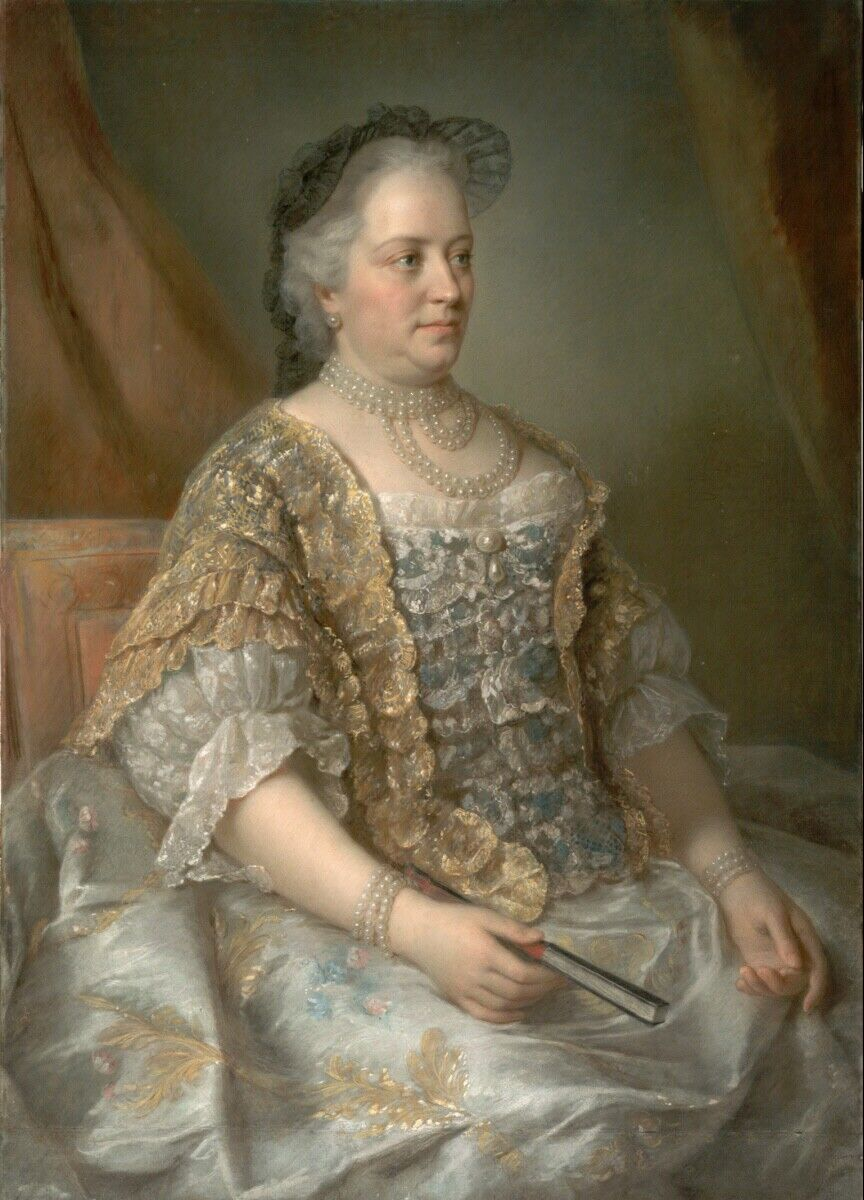
Maria Theresa's determination to recover Silesia was a key factor in the 1756 Diplomatic Revolution

The terms of the peace largely failed to resolve the issues that caused the war in the first place, while most of the signatories either resented the concessions they made, or felt they had failed to obtain what they were due. These factors led to the diplomatic re-alignment known as the 1756 Diplomatic Revolution, and the subsequent Seven Years' War.

Prussia, which doubled in size and wealth with the acquisition of Silesia, was the most obvious beneficiary, Austria arguably the biggest loser. Maria Theresa did not see acceptance of the Pragmatic Sanction as any kind of concession, while she deeply resented Britain's insistence that Austria cede Silesia and the concessions made in Italy. On the other hand, the Habsburgs survived a potentially disastrous crisis, regained the Austrian Netherlands and largely retained their position in Italy.

Administrative and financial reforms made Austria stronger in 1750 than 1740, while its strategic position was strengthened by installing Habsburgs as rulers of key territories in Northwest Germany, the Rhineland and Northern Italy.

The Spanish considered their territorial gains in Italy inadequate, failed to recover Menorca or Gibraltar, and viewed the reassertion of British commercial rights in the Americas as an insult. Charles Emmanuel III of Sardinia felt he had been promised the Duchy of Parma, but had to content himself with minor cessions from Austria. The war confirmed the decline of the Dutch Republic as a great power, and exposed the weakness of their Barrier forts, which proved unable to stand up to modern artillery.

Few Frenchmen understood the desperate financial state that required the return of their gains in the Austrian Netherlands; combined with the lack of tangible benefits for helping Prussia, it led to the phrase "as stupid as the Peace". This view was widely shared; many French statesmen felt Louis XV had panicked, while English writer and politician, Horace Walpole, wrote "wonderful it is...why the French have lost so much blood and treasure to so little purpose". As a result of the Treaty Charles Edward Stuart, the Jacobite Pretender to the thrones of Britain was arrested and exiled from France.

The decline of the Dutch Republic as a military power exposed the vulnerability of Hanover, George II's German possession. In exchange for restoring the Barrier forts, France insisted on the return of Louisbourg, the capture of which in 1745 was one of the few clear British successes of the war. This caused fury in both Britain and America, where it was seen as benefitting the Dutch and Hanover at the expense of the American colonies.

John Montagu, 4th Earl of Sandwich, the lead British negotiator, failed to include the Utrecht terms in the list of Anglo-Spanish agreements renewed in the Preliminaries to the treaty. When he tried to amend the final version, the Spanish refused to approve it, threatening the lucrative import and export trade between the two countries. Since it was equally valuable to the Spanish, they later agreed terms in the October 1750 Treaty of Madrid, but it was another source of popular dissatisfaction with the treaty.

Austrian resentment of British 'disloyalty' was mirrored in London; many questioned the value of the financial subsidies paid to Vienna, and suggested Prussia as a more suitable ally. In the 1752 Treaty of Aranjuez, Austria, Spain and Sardinia agreed to respect each other's boundaries in Italy, ending conflict in this region for nearly fifty years, and allowing Maria Theresa to focus on Germany. Her determination to regain Silesia, combined with a feeling the Treaty had left many issues unresolved, meant that it was seen as an armistice, not a peace.

The treaty would mark the end of the Anglo-French India-based First Carnatic War.

The London celebrations of the signing of the treaty featured music specially composed by George Frideric Handel, the Music for the Royal Fireworks.

== Sources ==
- Anderson, Matthew Smith (1995). The War of the Austrian Succession 1740–1748. Routledge. ISBN 978-0-582-05950-4.
- Armour, Ian (2012). A History of Eastern Europe 1740–1918. Bloomsbury Academic Press. ISBN 978-1849664882.
- Black, Jeremy (1994). British Foreign Policy in an Age of Revolutions, 1783–1793. Cambridge University Press. ISBN 978-0-521-45001-0.
- Black, Jeremy (1999). Britain as a Military Power, 1688–1815. Routledge. ISBN 978-1-85728-772-1.
- Browning, Reed (1975). The War of the Austrian Succession (1993 ed.). New York: St Martin's Press. ISBN 978-0-312-09483-6.
- Douglas, Hugh (1975). Charles Edward Stuart. London: Hale. ISBN 978-0709148159.
- Hochedlinger, Michael (2003). Austria's Wars of Emergence, 1683–1797. Routledge. ISBN 978-0-582-29084-6.
- Lesaffer, Randall. "The Peace of Aachen (1748) and the Rise of Multilateral Treaties". Oxford Public International Law.
- Lodge, Richard (1932). "Presidential Address: Sir Benjamin Keene, K.B.: A Study in Anglo-Spanish Relations in the Earlier Part of the Eighteenth Century". Transactions of the Royal Historical Society. 15: 1–43. doi:10.2307/3678642. JSTOR 3678642. S2CID 163640610.
- McKay, Derek (1983). The Rise of the Great Powers 1648–1815. Routledge. ISBN 978-0-582-48554-9.
- McGill, William J (1971). "The Roots of Policy: Kaunitz in Vienna and Versailles, 1749–1753". The Journal of Modern History. 43 (2): 228–244. doi:10.1086/240615. JSTOR 1876544. S2CID 145267435.
- McLynn, Frank (2008). 1759: The Year Britain Became Master of the World. Vintage. ISBN 978-0-09-952639-1.
- Scott, Hamish (2015). The Birth of a Great Power System, 1740–1815. Routledge. ISBN 978-1-138-13423-2.
- Sosin, Jack M (1957). "Louisburg and the Peace of Aix-la-Chapelle, 1748". The William and Mary Quarterly. 14 (4): 516–535. doi:10.2307/1918519. JSTOR 1918519.

== Bibliography ==
- Olson, J. S.; Shadle, R. (1996). Historical Dictionary of the British Empire. Westport, Conn.: Greenwood Press. pp. 1095–1099. ISBN 978-0-313-29367-2. OCLC 29843555.
- Savelle, Max (March 1939). "Diplomatic Preliminaries of the Seven Years' War in America". Canadian Historical Review. Vol. 20, No. 1: 17–36. doi:10.3138/CHR-020-01-04.
