= Argenson =

Argenson, derived from an old hamlet situated in what is now the département of Indre-et-Loire, is the name of a French family which produced some prominent statesmen, soldiers and men of letters. The family's noble affiliation dates from 1374

== Principal members ==
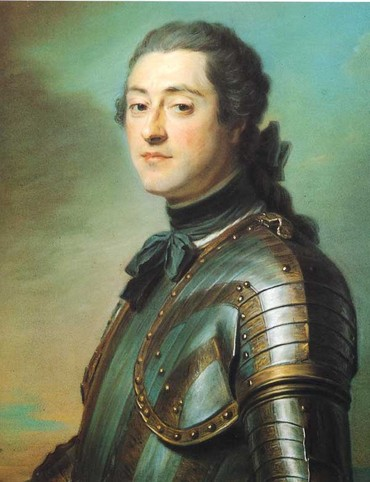
Marc-René de Voyer d'Argenson (1721–1782) by Maurice Quentin de La Tour.

- René de Voyer de Paulmy d'Argenson (1596–1651)
  - Marc-René de Voyer de Paulmy d'Argenson (1623–1700)
    - Marc-René de Voyer de Paulmy d'Argenson (1652-1721)
      - René Louis de Voyer de Paulmy d'Argenson (1694–1757)
        - Marc Antoine René de Voyer de Paulmy d'Argenson (1722–1787)
      - Marc-Pierre de Voyer de Paulmy d'Argenson (1696–1764)
        - Marc-René de Voyer d'Argenson (1721–1782)
  - Pierre de Voyer d'Argenson, Vicomte de Mouzay

== Chronological list of the marquises of Argenson ==
The title of Argenson, in Touraine, was established as a marquisate in January 1700.

1. 1700–1721 : Marc-René de Voyer de Paulmy d'Argenson (1652–1721), 1st Marquis d'Argenson
2. 1721–1757 : René-Louis de Voyer de Paulmy d'Argenson (1694–1757), 2nd Marquis d'Argenson
3. 1757–1787 : Marc-René de Voyer de Paulmy d'Argenson (1722–1787), 3rd Marquis d'Argenson
4. 1787–1842 : Marc-René de Voyer de Paulmy d'Argenson (1771–1842), 4th Marquis d'Argenson
5. 1842–1862 : Charles Marc-René de Voyer de Paulmy d'Argenson (1796–1862), 5th Marquis d'Argenson
6. 1862–1897 : Marc-René Marie de Voyer de Paulmy d'Argenson (1836–1897), 6th Marquis d'Argenson
7. 1897–1931 : Maurice Charles Marc-René de Voyer de Paulmy d'Argenson (1875–1931), 7th Marquis d'Argenson
8. 1931–1975 : Marc-Pierre Aurélien Jean Henri de Voyer de Paulmy d'Argenson (1906–1975), 8th Marquis d'Argenson
9. 1975–1999 : Marc-René François de Voyer de Paulmy d'Argenson (1948–1999), 9th Marquis d'Argenson
10. 1999 : Jean-Denis Melchior de Voyer de Paulmy d'Argenson (°1952), 10th Marquis d'Argenson, (end of the line?)
