= Marc-René de Voyer de Paulmy d'Argenson =

Marc-René de Voyer de Paulmy d'Argenson may refer to:

- Marc-René de Voyer de Paulmy d'Argenson (1623-1700), seigneur d'Argenson et de Vueil-le-Mesnil, comte de Rouffiac, a French knight, politician and diplomat
- Marc-René de Voyer de Paulmy d'Argenson (1652-1721), 1st marquis d'Argenson, a French politician
- Marc-René de Voyer de Paulmy d'Argenson (1722-1787), French ambassador, Minister of War and a noted bibliophile and collector of art
- Marc-René de Voyer de Paulmy d'Argenson (1771–1842), a member of the French Chamber of Deputies
- René Louis de Voyer de Paulmy d'Argenson, marquis d'Argenson (1694–1757), a French statesman
- René de Voyer de Paulmy d'Argenson, comte d'Argenson (1596–1651), a French diplomat

== See also ==
- Marc-Pierre de Voyer de Paulmy d'Argenson
- Pierre de Voyer d'Argenson, Vicomte de Mouzay
- Category:Marquesses of Argenson
