= Marc-René de Voyer de Paulmy =

Marc-René de Voyer de Paulmy may refer to:

- Marc-René de Voyer de Paulmy d'Argenson (1652–1721), 1st marquis d'Argenson
- Marc-René de Voyer de Paulmy d'Argenson (1722–1787), 3rd marquis d'Argenson
