= René Louis de Voyer de Paulmy, Marquis of Argenson =

French politician (1694–1757)

The Marquis of Argenson
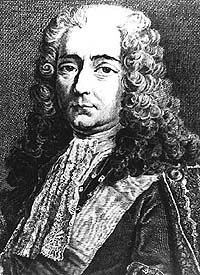
- René-Louis de Voyer de Paulmy, Marquis d' Argenson

Secretary of State for Foreign Affairs
- In office 19 November 1744 – 10 January 1747
- Preceded by: The Duke of Noailles
- Succeeded by: The Marquis of Puisieux

Intendant French Hainaut
- In office 1720–1724
- Preceded by: Jean-Charles Doujat
- Succeeded by: Félix Aubery de Vastan

Governor of Épernay
- In office 1727–1770
- Preceded by: Carloman Philogène Brulart, Comte de Sillery

Personal details
- Born: 18 October 1694 Paris
- Died: 26 January 1757 (aged 62) Saint-Sulpice-de-Favières
- Other political affiliations: Académie des Inscriptions et Belles-Lettres
- Spouse: Marie Madeleine Méliand
- Children: Marc Antoine (1722-1787)
- Education: Lycée Louis-le-Grand

René-Louis de Voyer de Paulmy, marquis of Argenson (18 October 1694 – 26 January 1757) was a politician who served as Minister for Foreign Affairs from November 1744 to January 1747 and was a friend of Voltaire. His younger brother, Marc-Pierre, Count of Argenson (1696–1764), was Minister of War from 1743 to 1757.

== Life ==
René-Louis de Voyer de Paulmy was born 18 October 1694, eldest son of Marc-René de Voyer de Paulmy d'Argenson (1652–1721) and Marguerite Le Fèvre de Caumartin (1672–1719). He had a younger brother, Marc-Pierre, Comte d'Argenson (1696–1764), who served as Minister of War from 1743 to 1747.

His father was Lieutenant General of Police and Controller-General of Finances, one of the most important positions in the Ancien Régime. He was a member of the Noblesse de robe or Nobles of the robe, a class that formed the Second Estate whose rank derived from holding judicial or administrative posts. They were usually hard-working professionals, unlike the aristocratic Noblesse d'épée or Nobles of the Sword. His grandfather and great-grandfather both served as French ambassador to the Republic of Venice.

== Career ==
D'Argenson qualified as a lawyer, and held successively the posts of councillor at the Parlement (1716), maître des requêtes (1718), councillor of state (1719), and Intendant of justice, police and finance in Hainaut. During his five years’ tenure of the last office he was mainly employed in provisioning the troops, who were suffering from the economic confusion resulting from John Law's system and the aftermath of the Mississippi Bubble.

D'Argenson returned to court in 1724 to exercise his functions as councillor of state. At that time he had the reputation of being a conscientious man, but ill-adapted to intrigue, and was nicknamed "la bête". He entered into relations with the philosophers, and was won over to the ideas of reform. He was the friend of Voltaire, who had been a fellow-student of his at the Jesuit college Louis-le-Grand, and a leading member of the Club de l'Entresol, an early modern think tank, the history of which he wrote in his memoirs. It was then that he prepared his Considérations sur le gouvernement de la France, which was published posthumously by his son.

D'Argenson was also the friend and counsellor of the minister Germain Louis Chauvelin. In May 1744 he was appointed member of the council of finance, and in November of the same year King Louis XV chose him as secretary of state for foreign affairs, his brother, Marc-Pierre, Comte d'Argenson, being at the same time secretary of state for war. France was at that time engaged in the War of the Austrian Succession, and the government had been placed by Louis XV virtually in the hands of the two brothers. The marquis d’Argenson endeavoured to reform the system of international relations. He dreamed of a "European Republic", and wished to establish arbitration between nations in pursuance of the ideas of his friend the abbé de Saint-Pierre. But he failed to realize any part of his projects. The generals negotiated in opposition to his instructions; his colleagues laid the blame on him; the intrigues of the courtiers passed unnoticed by him; whilst the secret diplomacy of the king neutralized his initiative. He concluded the marriage of the Louis, the Dauphin to Maria, a daughter of King Augustus III of Poland, but was unable to prevent the election of the Francis, Grand-Duke of Tuscany as Holy Roman Emperor in 1745.

On 10 January 1747 Louis XV thanked d'Argenson for his services. He then retired into private life, eschewed the court, associated with Voltaire, Condillac and d’Alembert, and spent his declining years in working at the Académie des Inscriptions, of which he was appointed president by the king in 1747, and revising his Mémoires. Voltaire, in one of his letters, declared him to be "the best citizen that had ever tasted the ministry". He died on 26 January 1757.

== Works ==
D'Argenson left a large number of manuscript works, of which his son, Marc Antoine René, Marquis de Paulmy, published the Considérations sur le gouvernement de France (Amsterdam, 1764) and Essais dans le goût de ceux de Montaigne (Amsterdam, 1785). The latter, which contains many useful biographical notes and portraits of his contemporaries, was republished in 1787 as Loisirs d’un ministre d’état. D'Argenson's most important work, however, is his Mémoires, covering in great detail the years 1725 to 1756, with an introductory part giving his recollections since the year 1696. They are, as they were intended to be, valuable "materials for the history of his time". There are two important editions, the first, with some letters, not elsewhere published, by the marquis d’Argenson, his great-grand-nephew (5 vols., Paris, 1857 et seq.); the second, more correct, but less complete, published by J. B. Rathery, for the Société de l’Histoire de France (9 vols., Paris, 1859 et seq.). The other works of the marquis d’Argenson, in MS., were destroyed in the fire at the Louvre library in 1871.

== Family ==
D'Argenson married and had a son:

- Marc Antoine René de Voyer (1722–1787), known as the marquis de Paulmy, served as Minister of War and was a noted bibliophile.

== Influence ==
In 1909, the anarchist Peter Kropotkin credited d'Argenson with making the study of politics, constitutions, and elective representation popular in the 18th century and for being an early advocate of communist or communal possession of the land.

== Sources ==
- Endnotes:
- Gasper, Julia (2013). The Marquis d'Argens: A Philosophical Life. Lexington. ISBN 978-0739182338.
  - Levasseur. "Le Marquis d’Argenson£ in the Mémoires de l’Académie des Sciences Morales et Politiques, (vol. lxxxvii., 1868)
  - E. Zevort, Le Marquis d’Argenson et le ministère des affaires étrangères, (Paris, 1880)
  - G. de R. de Flassan, Histoire de la diplomatie française, (2nd ed., 1811)
  - Voltaire, Siècle de Louis XV
  - E. Boutaric, Correspondance secrète inédite de Louis XV, (1866)
  - E. Champion, "Le Marquis d’Argenson", in the Révolution française, (vol. xxxvi., 1899)
  - A. Alem, D’Argenson économiste (Paris, 1899)
  - Arthur Ogle, The Marquis d’Argenson (1893)

Political offices
Preceded by Adrien Maurice de Noailles, 3rd Duke of Noailles	Foreign Minister of France; 19 November 1744 – 10 January 1747	Succeeded by Louis Philogène Brûlart, vicomte de Puisieulx
