= Conseiller d'État =

Position in France

In France, a Councillor of State (French: conseiller d'État，pronounced [kɔ̃sɛje deta]) is a high-level government official of administrative law in the French Council of State.

== Under the Ancien Régime ==
Councillors of State were among the highest dignitaries of the French monarchy during the Ancien Régime. Being thirty in total, the Councillors of State included three clergymen, three from the old nobility (nobility "of the sword" or d'épée), and twenty-four from the noblesse de robe, or "administrative nobility". Ninety percent of the Councillors of State de robe were promoted from among the Masters of Requests, while the rest were chosen from among judges of the prerogative courts; often they had prior experience working as intendants. In 1789, their number was increased to 42: 25 full-time Councillors ordinary, 16 part-time consellors who functioned on a semester schedule, and the eldest of the Masters of Requests.

Their title gave them great power, and in the administrative hierarchy they were considered directly below Princes of the royal family ("princes du sang"), cardinals, and Dukes or Peers ("Ducs et pairs"). The pay was minimal, i.e., 3,300 to 5,100 French pounds per year, depending on the duration of service, but could be augmented by an additional 4,000 pounds per year through pensions or by service on financial commissions.

Councillors held commissions (i.e. not purchased and hereditary offices) appointed by the king by letters patent. The prestigious position conferred immediate nobility on the commission-holder, if not already a member of the nobility. Their official job description stated that they were to be "consulted by the King on any matter and on any occasion as the King saw fit". In practice, their role was a combination of the duties of present-day Councillors of State and justices of the French Supreme Court.

Commissions were not limited by age, although the King generally appointed men of lawful age. René-Louis de Voyer de Paulmy d'Argenson became Councillor of State at the age of 24 and Marc-Pierre de Voyer de Paulmy d'Argenson at 22. Councillors often combined their function with other administrative positions such as ambassador, President of the High Court, and so forth

All the Councillors of State sat on the King's Council of State ("Conseil privé", "Conseil des parties" or "Conseil d'État"). As part of the judicial system and officially established in 1557, this was the largest of the King's Councils, composed of the Lord Chancellor, Dukes and Peers, the Ministers and Secretaries of State, the Controller-General, the 30 Councillors of State, the 80 Masters of Requests, and the Intendants of finance. The State councillors could also be called before other of the King's Councils on affairs under their charge.

== After the Revolution ==
Councillors of State became high-level government officials serving in the Council of State. A Councillor of State is one of the six ranks of the Council's members, namely, Master, Senior Master, Master of Requests, Councillor of State, Department Head, and Vice-Chairman.

== See also ==
- State Councillor (Russia)
