= Marc-René de Voyer de Paulmy d'Argenson (1623–1700) =

French administrator and diplomat

Marc-René de Voyer de Paulmy d'Argenson, Comte de Rouffiac
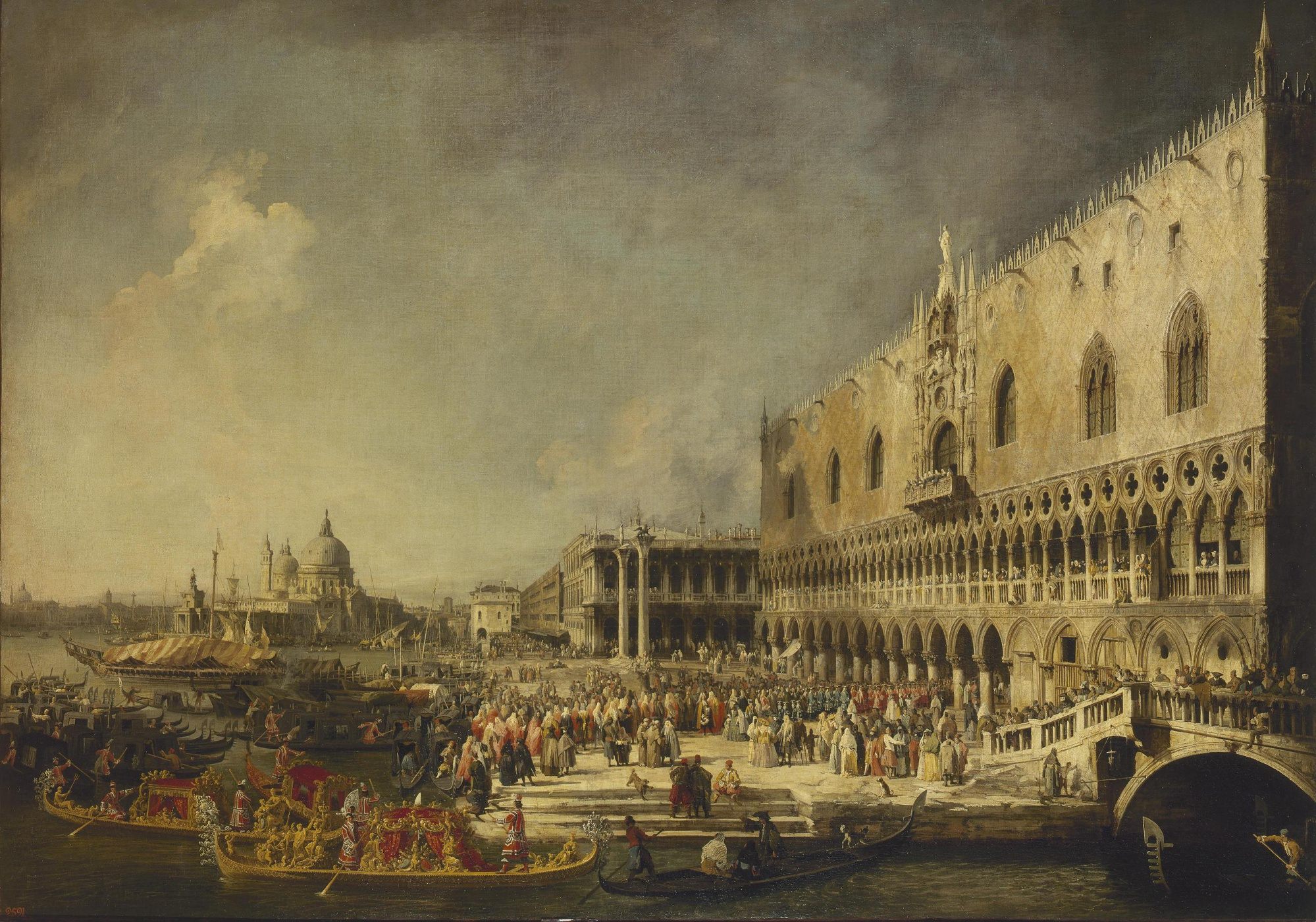
- Reception of the French Ambassador to Venice, 1726

French Ambassador to the Venetian Republic
- In office 1651–1655
- Preceded by: René de Voyer de Paulmy d'Argenson
- Succeeded by: Bernard du Plessis-Besançon

Maîtres des Requêtes

Personal details
- Born: 13 December 1623 Blois, Loir-et-Cher, France
- Died: 1 May 1700 (aged 76)
- Spouse: Marguerite Houlier de La Pouyade
- Children: Marc-René de Voyer de Paulmy d'Argenson (1652-1721), six others

Marc-René de Voyer de Paulmy d'Argenson (13 December 1623 – 1 May 1700), was a French administrator and diplomat, who served as ambassador to Venetian Republic from 1651 to 1655.

Although his career ended in 1655 for reasons that are unclear, his eldest son Marc-René de Voyer de Paulmy d'Argenson (1652-1721) became Lieutenant General of Police and Controller-General of Finances, while his grandsons included René Louis d'Argenson, Minister for Foreign Affairs 1744 to 1747, and Marc-Pierre, Comte d'Argenson, Minister of War 1743 to 1747.

== Biography ==
Marc-René de Voyer de Paulmy d'Argenson was born at Blois on 13 December 1623, eldest son of René de Voyer de Paulmy d'Argenson and Hélène de La Font. His siblings included Louis (died 1694), Abbott of Beaulieu-en-Rouergue, Pierre, Vicomte de Mouzay, (ca 1625–1709) Governor of New France 1651 to 1655, Jacques (1628-1715), and Madeleine, who married Louis de Bernage, later head of the Grand Conseil.

In 1650, he married Marguerite Houlier de La Pouyade; her family were also senior lawyers and administrators in Angoulême, whose titles included Comte de Rouffiac. In 1654, the title was transferred to D'Argenson, and they had seven children; Marc-René de Voyer de Paulmy d'Argenson (1652-1721), Antoinette-Catherine (1654-?), Françoise (?), François-Élie (1656–1728), later Archbishop of Bordeaux, Thérèse-Hélène, Marie-Scholastique (1661-?), and Joseph-Ignace (1662-1690), a member of the Knights Hospitaller.

== Career ==
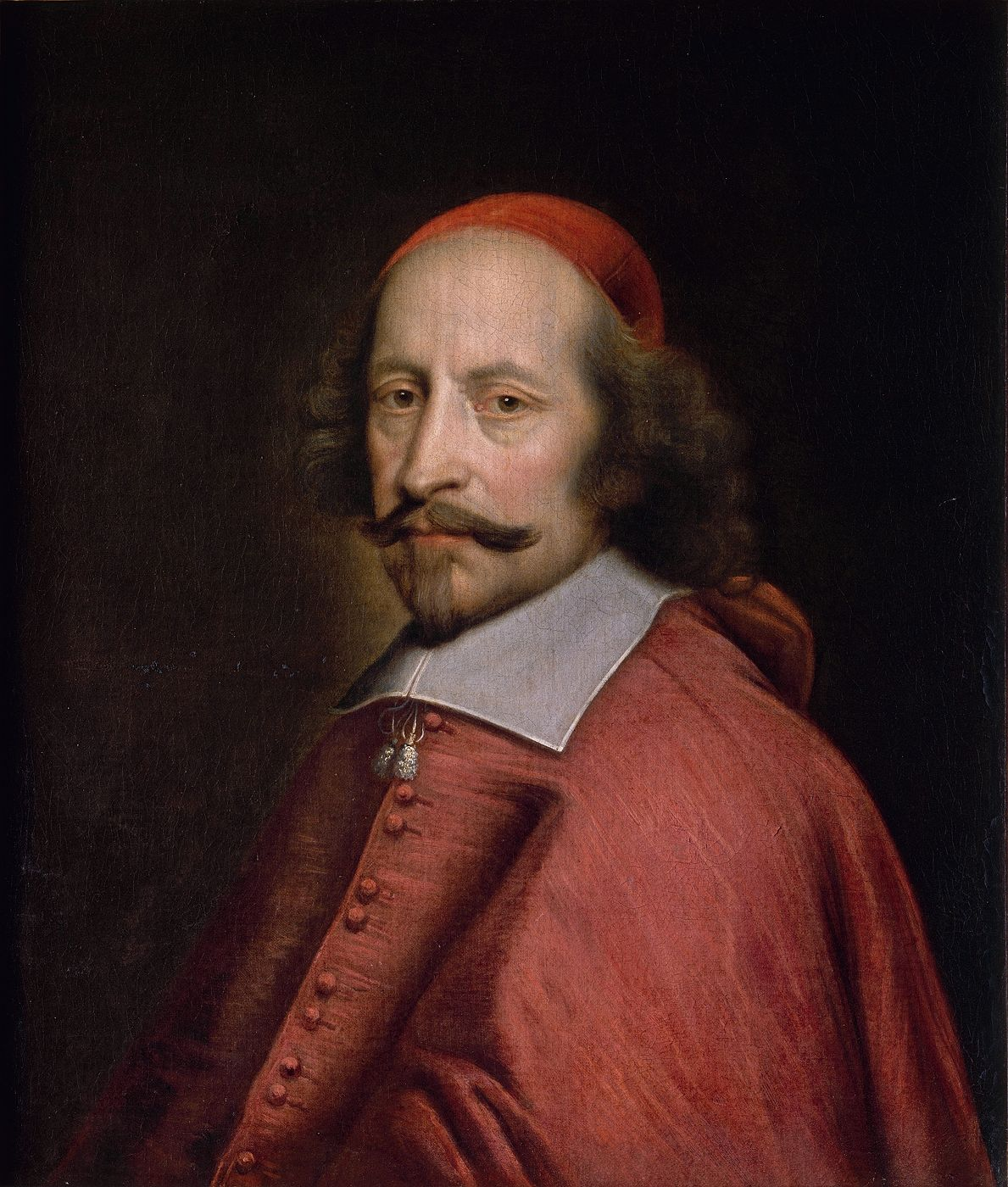
Cardinal Mazarin, French chief minister 1642 to 1661; for reasons that are unclear, he removed D'Argenson from Venice, ending his career

D'Argenson's father was a councillor in the Parlement de Paris, and a Maîtres des Requêtes, a class of lawyers who acted as professional bureaucrats, government officials and diplomats. They were part of the Noblesse de robe or Nobles of the robe, or the Second Estate in pre-Revolutionary France. Rank derived from holding judicial or administrative posts, and its members were hard-working professionals, unlike the aristocratic Noblesse d'épée or Nobles of the Sword.

As was customary for eldest sons, D'Argenson followed the same career path; in 1642, he became councillor in the Parlement de Normandie, or Rouen, and later Maîtres des Requêtes. He accompanied his father to Venice in 1651, when he was appointed Ambassador to the Venetian Republic. When he died shortly after their arrival in November, D'Argenson replaced him as envoy; in 1655, he fell from favour and was replaced by Cardinal Mazarin, who removed him from his office of councillor of state.

Although D'Argenson never held office again, he was reinstated as an honorary Maîtres des Requêtes in 1657. His son Marc-René became Lieutenant General of Police and Controller-General of Finances, two of the most important positions in the Ancien Régime. His grandsons included René Louis d'Argenson, Minister for Foreign Affairs, 1744 to 1747, and Marc-Pierre, Comte d'Argenson, Minister of War, 1743 to 1747.

In September 1656, he joined the Paris chapter of the Company of the Holy Sacrament, a Catholic society founded in 1627 by Henri de Levis, duc de Ventadour. It differed from similar organisations in being kept secret, and was suppressed in 1666 when its existence became known. The society disappeared from view until 1865, when a history of the Paris house written by D'Argenson was discovered in the Bibliothèque nationale.

In addition to his history of the Society, he wrote various religious works, most of which have not survived. He was a friend of Jean Louis Guez de Balzac, (1597-1654), also from Charente and a founding member of the Académie française, now remembered for the style, rather than content, of his writing.

He died 1 May 1700.

== Sources ==
- Chisholm, Hugh, ed. (1911). "Argenson" . Encyclopædia Britannica. Vol. 02 (11th ed.). Cambridge University Press. pp. 457–460.
- Gasper, Julia (2013). The Marquis d'Argens: A Philosophical Life. Lexington. ISBN 978-0739182338.
- Hozier, Louis Pierre d' (1745). Armorial général, ou Registres de la noblesse de France. Prault.
- Lennon, T. (2015). Nolan, L. (ed.). Balzac, Jean-Louis Guez de (1595–1654) in The Cambridge Descartes Lexicon. Cambridge University Press.
- Moréri, Louis (1725). Le grand dictionnaire historique, Volume VI. Denys Marriette.
- Norberg, Kathryn (1992). Rich and Poor in Grenoble, 1600-1814. University of California Press. ISBN 978-0520052604.
