= Louis de Cormontaigne =

French military engineer (1696–1752)

- Born: 4 May 1696; Strasbourg, Alsace
- Died: 30 March 1752 (aged 55); Metz
- Military career
- Allegiance: France
- Branch: Engineer
- Service years: 1713-1752
- Rank: Maréchal de Camp 1748
- Commands: Directeur des fortifications, Metz (1745-1752)
- Conflicts: Spanish Succession 1701-1714; 1713 Rhineland campaign Polish Succession 1733-1735; Austrian Succession 1740-1748

Louis de Cormontaigne (French pronunciation: [lwi də kɔʁmɔ̃tɛɲ], 1696-1752) was a French military engineer, who was the dominant technical influence on French fortifications in the 18th century. His own designs and writings constantly referenced the work of Vauban (1633-1707) and his principles formed the basis of the curriculum used by the École royale du génie, established at Charleville-Mézières in 1744.

Although contemporary references spell his name Cormontaigne, many near-contemporaneous texts use the spelling Cormontaingne.

== Life ==
Louis de Cormontaigne was born in Strasbourg in Alsace, a city part of the Holy Roman Empire until 1681, when it was annexed by France. His family are described as escuyer or esquire, making him a member of the minor gentry.

He married Marie Aimé de Gougon and they had a daughter Marie Antoinette (1749-?), whose husband was Maurice Regnault (1740-?), an official of the Regional Parliament of Lorraine.

He died in Metz on 30 March 1752.

== Career ==
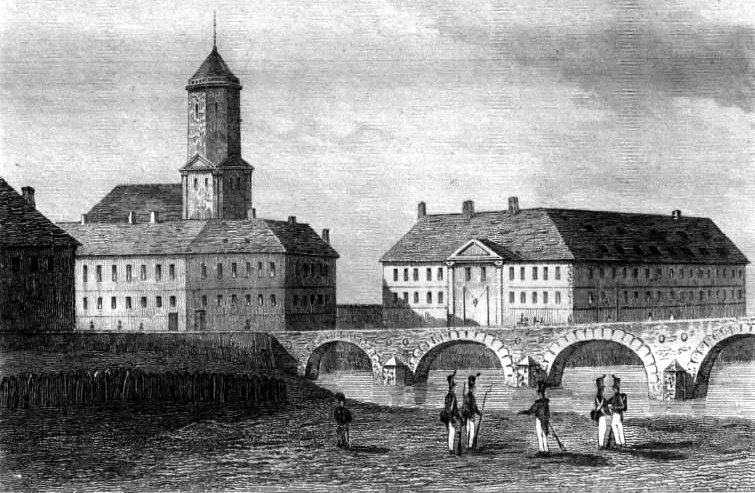
Fort Moselle, Metz in 1838; constructed by de Cormontaigne in 1733

De Cortmontaigne joined the French army in 1713, participating in the Rhineland campaign, the final part of the War of the Spanish Succession before passing the exam for the Corps royal du génie in 1715. Entry was carefully controlled; between 1699 and 1743, only 630 candidates were accepted, the vast majority relatives of existing or former members.

One of the principles behind the 18th century Age of Enlightenment was the idea that every activity could be expressed in terms of a universal system, including military tactics. The preference for a single approach, a tendency to recruit from within and Vauban's huge legacy meant French military engineering became ultra-conservative. Many 'new' works either used his designs, or professed to do so, which persisted into the late 19th century; Fort de Queuleu, built in 1867 near Metz, was a Vauban-style strongpoint, despite being long since been rendered obsolete by advances in artillery.

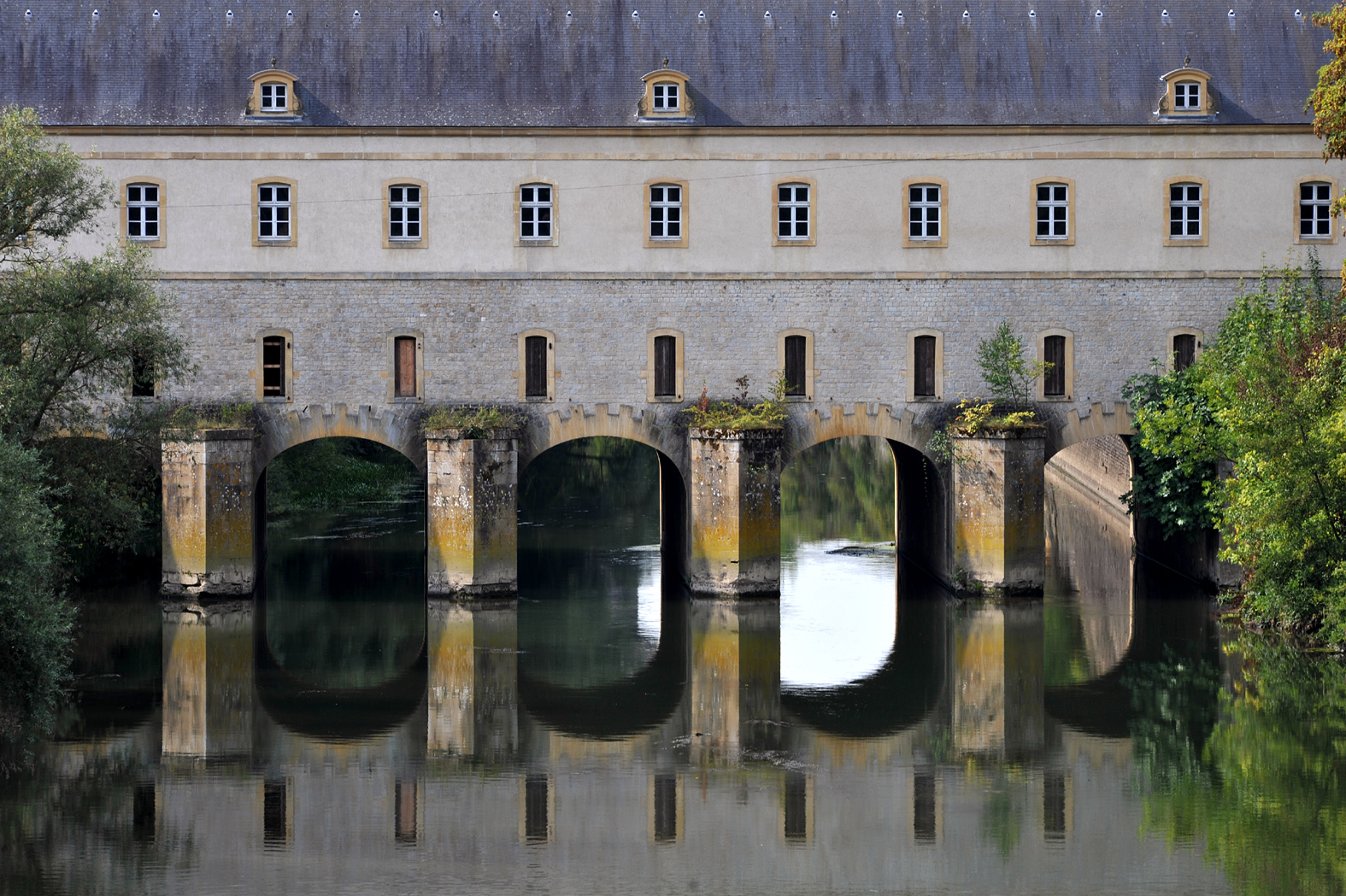
Pont de Cormontaigne, Thionville, Moselle; built by Cormontaigne in 1745-1746 and still in use today

France was largely at peace in the first part of de Cortmontaigne's career; by 1728, he had reached the rank of captain but the 1733-1735 War of the Polish Succession led to a reassessment of existing fortifications. The loss of Luxembourg after 1697 exposed the French border around the Upper Moselle and in 1733 his plan for covering this was approved by the Marquis d'Asfeld, head of fortifications since 1715. He became ingénieur en chef or chief engineer at Metz, constructing double crownworks at Bellecroix, Fort Moselle and Yutz, which he claimed to be adaptations of Vauban's original designs and in 1745, he was appointed Director of Fortifications for the Three Bishoprics.

Unlike Vauban, de Cortmontaigne never commanded a siege and was a relatively junior official for much of his career, only reaching the rank of Maréchal de Camp in 1748. Although viewed as a competent engineer, his prominence has been attributed to the ability to write clear and concise memoranda, with a wealth of detail; during a debate in 1741 with Forest de Bélidor over upgrades to the defences of Metz and Neuf-Brisach, he 'proved' his designs superior, using calculations he claimed were based on Vauban's principles. As the Marquis de Montalembert remarked after the unsuccessful 1779-1783 Siege Gibraltar, using the same approach he could 'prove' Gibraltar should have been taken after six days.

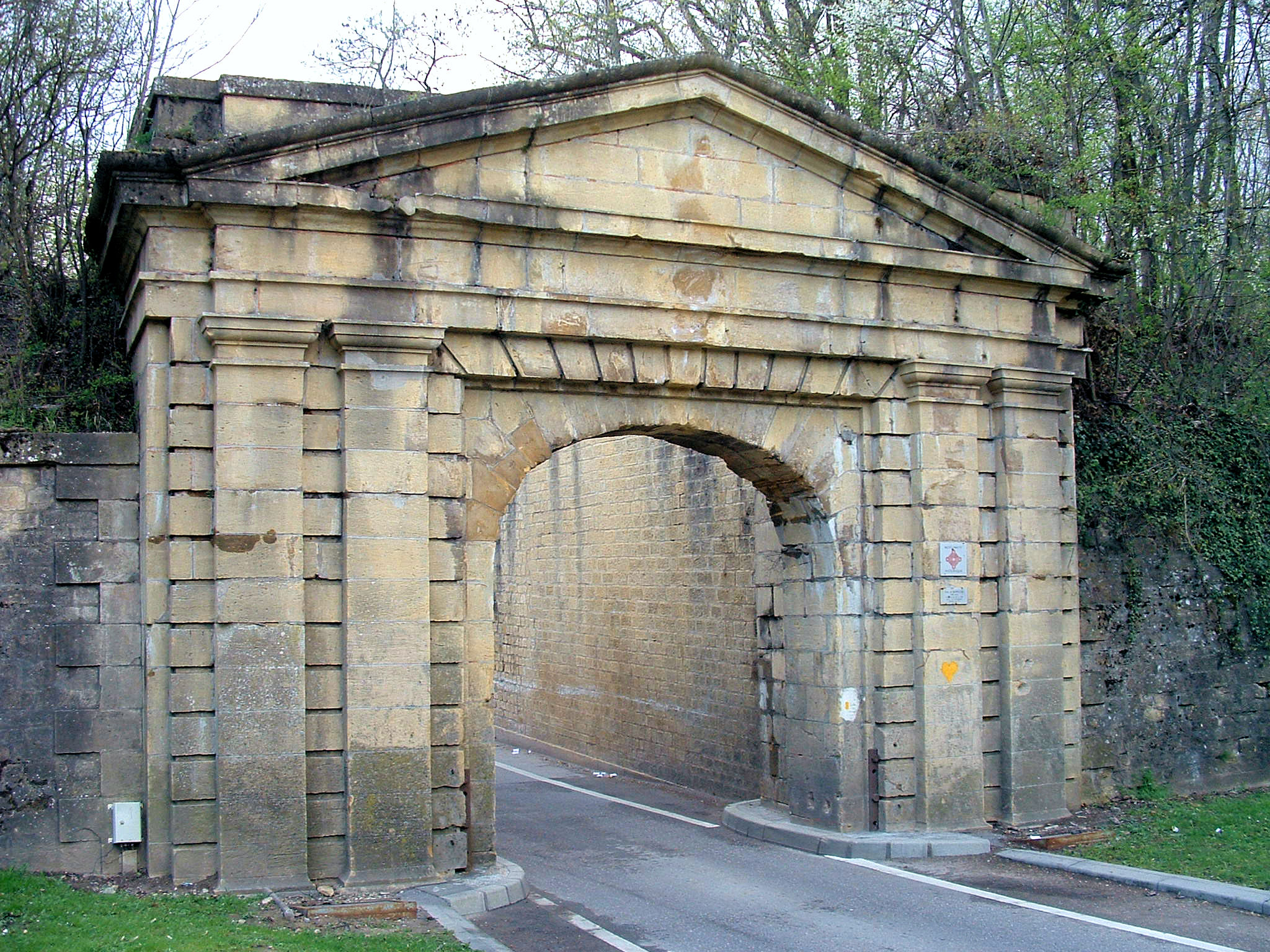
Part of de Cortmontaigne's crownworks at Bellecroix; the Porte de Sarrelouis

Asfeld managed the engineering corps like an extended family; over the years, ability became less important than connections and after his death in 1743, the Comte d'Argenson, Minister of War, sought to impose a more structured approach. Much of the detail behind this was provided by de Cortmontainge, including the curriculum for the new École royale du génie established at Charleville-Mézières in 1744. He published very little in his lifetime but after his death in 1752, his precepts were collected and published in three volumes; the first, on the design and construction of fortifications, the second on offensive siege tactics and the third, defensive.

Their publication coincided with a reassessment of French military tactics, partly due to Prussian successes in the War of the Austrian Succession, which was attributed to greater mobility. As far back as 1701, Marlborough had argued winning one battle was more beneficial than taking 12 fortresses; this line was followed by many others, notably Marshall Saxe, the most successful French general of the period, whose work on the art of war, Mes Rêveries, was published posthumously in 1757. The debate increased after French losses in the 1756-1763 Seven Years' War and in 1776, Montalembert published the first of twelve volumes on La Fortification perpendiculaire. A rejection of the principles advocated by Vauban and de Cormontaingne, his ideas were largely dismissed in France but became prevailing orthodoxy in much of Europe.

In addition to the Pont de Cormontaigne, built at Thionville, Moselle between 1745 and 1746 and still in use today, he is commemorated by the Lycée Louis De Cormontaigne in Metz, while one of the stations on the Lille Metro is named after him.

== Sources ==
- Picon, Antoine (2001). Delon, Michel (ed.). Encyclopedia of the Enlightenment. Routledge. ISBN 978-1579582463.;
- Duffy, Christopher (1995). Siege Warfare: The Fortress in the Early Modern World 1494-1660. Routledge. ISBN 978-0415146494.;
- Gay, Peter (1996). The Enlightenment: An Interpretation. W.W. Norton & Company. ISBN 978-0393008708.;
- Mousnier, Roland (1979). The Institutions of France Under the Absolute Monarchy, 1598-1789. University of Chicago Press. ISBN 978-0226543277.;
