= Venality =

Historical practice

Venality is a historical practice where men would pay to be placed in positions of wealth and prestige. It historically occurred among those in government or military careers. France in particular was known for frequently selling government positions during the 1500s through the late 1700s. In contrast, the colony of New France did not allow venality.

Venality was prevalent in Spanish colonies in the Americas.

== Ancien régime ==
In the context of the French ancien régime, a venal office refers to an office sold by the state to raise money. These offices, which were mostly in areas of the judicial system, were retained in exchange for an annual tax of one-sixtieth of the value known as the paulette.

These offices provided access to power and opportunities for profit for those who bought them. The more important offices, which were more expensive, also conferred on their holders personal noble status that became hereditary, generally after three generations.

Through venality of office, many bourgeoisie could hope for eventual noble status, and this provided an important avenue of social mobility for the expanding middle class. Prior to the French Revolution the bourgeoisie occupied 47,000 of the 51,000 venal offices, though this accounted for less than half of the total amount invested in venality.

Louis XIV replenished his treasury by proliferating the amount of offices, as did his successors. In the 17th century, the office of councillor in the Parlement sold for 100,000 livres. By the mid-18th century, its value was reduced to half. The office of maître des requetes only lost 33 per cent of its value.

Venal offices were abolished and reimbursed in 1789.

== See also ==
- Nobles of the Robe
- Simony, the act of selling church offices and roles
- Purchase of commissions in the British Army
