= Pierre de Voyer d'Argenson =

Pierre de Voyer d'Argenson may refer to:

- Marc-Pierre de Voyer de Paulmy, comte d'Argenson, 18th century French politician
- Pierre de Voyer d'Argenson (Governor), Vicomte de Mouzay, Governor of New France (1658–1661)
