= Charles Marc-René de Voyer de Paulmy d'Argenson =

French archaeologist and politician

Charles Marc-René de Voyer de Paulmy d'Argenson (20 April 1796 – 31 July 1862), marquis d'Argenson, was a French archaeologist and politician.

== Biography ==
Charles, son of Marc-René de Voyer de Paulmy d'Argenson (1771–1842), was born in Boulogne-sur-Seine on 20 of April 1796. He concerned himself little with politics. He was, however, a member of the conseil général of Vienne for six years, but was expelled from it in 1840 in consequence of his advanced ideas and his relations with the opposition. In 1848 he was elected deputy from Vienne to the Chamber of Deputies (France) by 12,000 votes.

He was an active member of the Archaeological Society of Touraine and the Society of Antiquaries of the West, and wrote learned works for these bodies. He collaborated in preparing the archives of the scientific congress at Tours in 1847; brought out two editions of the manuscripts of his great-granduncle Marc-Pierre de Voyer de Paulmy d'Argenson, the minister of foreign affairs under Louis XV, under the title Mémoires du marquis d'Argenson, one in 1825, and the other, in 5 volumes, in 1857–1858; and published Discours et opinions de mon père, M. Voyer d'Argenson (2 volumes, 1845). He died on 31 July 1862. He also wrote an essay about nationalities in Europe.
