= Victor de Broglie, Prince of Broglie =

French Army officer and politician (1756–1794)

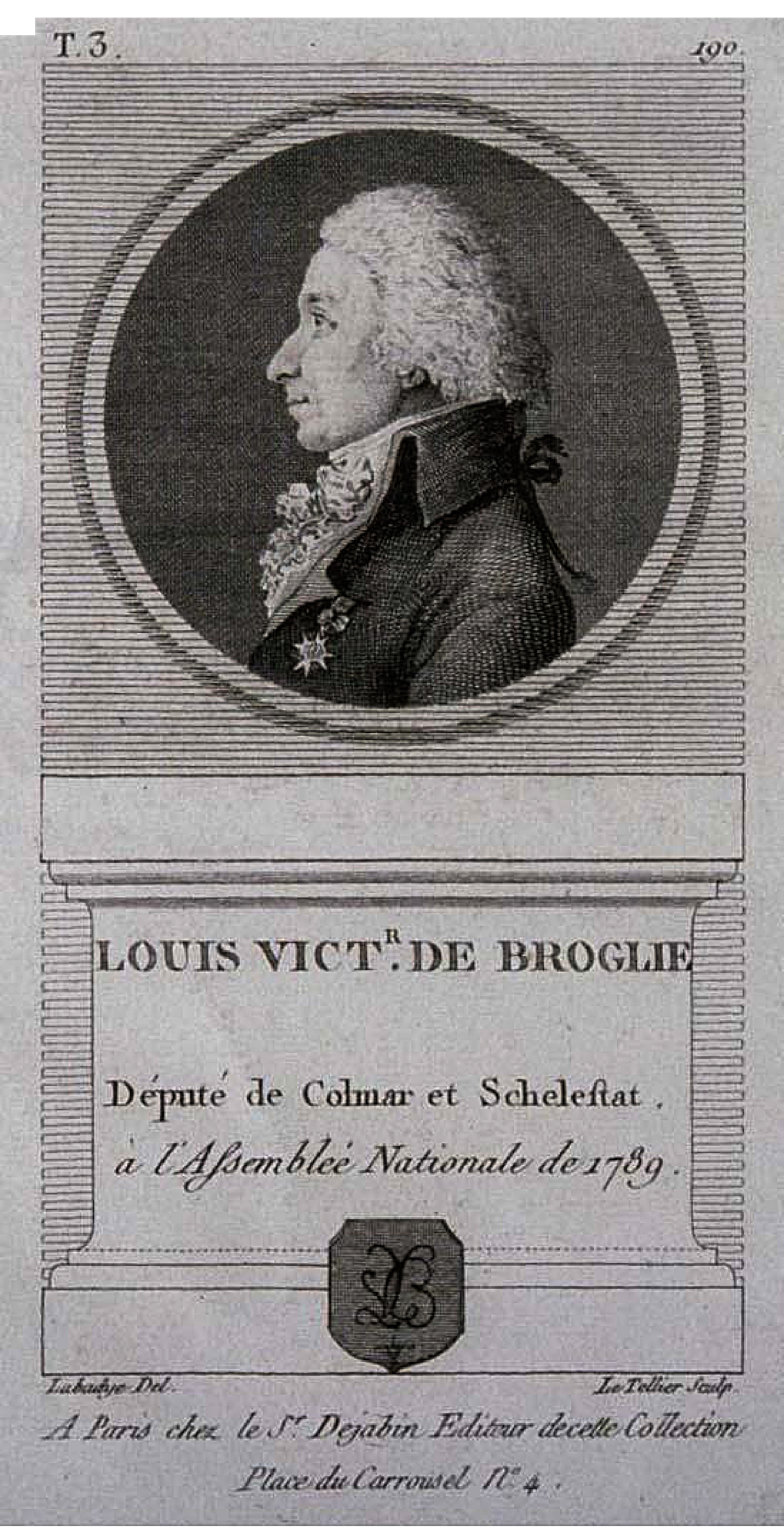
Memorial of Charles Toussaint Labadye - Victor de Broglie

Victor de Broglie, Prince of Broglie (French: [viktɔʁ də bʁɔj]; 22 September 1756 – 27 June 1794) was a French Army officer and politician who was executed by guillotine during the French Revolution.

== Biography ==
Victor de Broglie was born in Paris, the eldest son of Victor François de Broglie, 2nd Duke of Broglie, who had attained the rank of maréchal de camp in the French Royal Army. Victor adopted radical opinions and served with the Marquis de La Fayette and the Comte de Rochambeau in the American War of Independence.

The prince was a member of the Jacobin Club, and sat in the National Constituent Assembly after the French Revolution, constantly voting on the Liberal side. He served as chief of the staff to the First Republic's Army on the Rhine, but, during the Reign of Terror, he was denounced, arrested, and guillotined in Paris.

Since the old duc de Broglie survived him, the prince de Broglie's eldest son, Victor, eventually became the third duc de Broglie. The prince's dying admonition to his little son was to remain faithful to the principles of the Revolution, however unjust and ungrateful it seemed then to be.

== Family ==
The prince's wife shared her husband's imprisonment, but managed to escape to Switzerland, where she remained till the fall of Robespierre. She then returned to Paris with her children and lived there quietly until 1796, when she married Marc-René de Voyer de Paulmy d'Argenson, grandson of the Comte d'Argenson (minister of war during the reign of Louis XV). Under the care of his step-father, Victor de Broglie received a careful and liberal education and made his entrée into the aristocratic and literary society of Paris under the First French Empire.
