= Marc-René de Voyer de Paulmy d'Argenson (1771–1842) =

Marc-René de Voyer de Paulmy Marquis d'Argenson
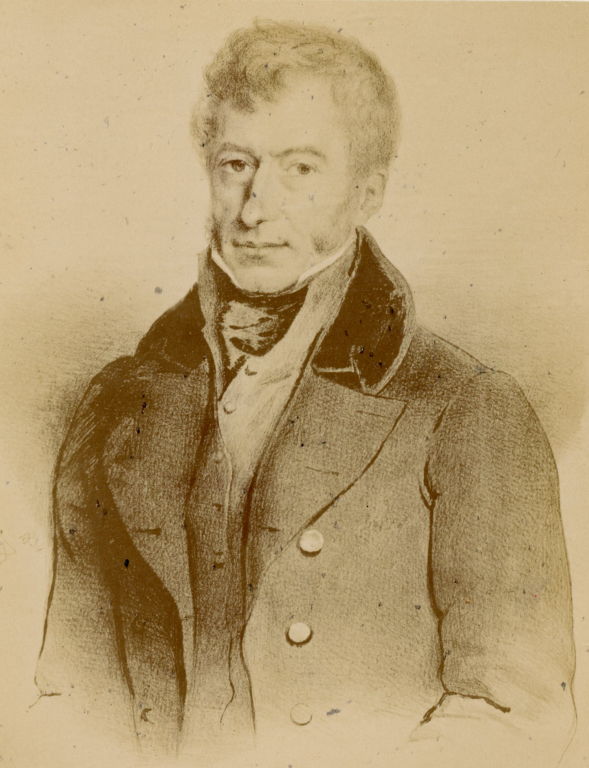

Member of the Chamber of Representatives for Haut-Rhin (Belfort)
- In office 12 May 1815 – 13 July 1815

Member of the Chamber of Deputies
- In office 22 August 1815 – 6 March 1824
- Constituency: Haut-Rhin (Belfort)
- In office 26 April 1828 – 15 July 1829
- Constituency: Eure (Pont-Audemer & Bernay)
- In office 21 October 1830 – 25 May 1834
- Constituency: Vienne (Châtellerault)

Personal details
- Born: 10 August 1771 Paris, Kingdom of France
- Died: 18 August 1842 (aged 70) Paris, French Kingdom
- Party: Liberals

Marc-René de Voyer de Paulmy d'Argenson (1771–1842), a member of the French Chamber of Deputies. D'Argenson was a grandson of Marc-Pierre, Count d'Argenson. He was a prefect of Deux-Nèthes from 1809 to 1813. As a member of the Chamber of Dueputies during the Hundred Days in 1815, he was a member of the French deputation to the allies to obtain the exclusion of the Bourbons. After the second restoration of Louis XVIII he was often elected as a member of the Chamber of Deputies and voted with the opposition.

== Biography ==
D'Argenson, son of Marc René, Marquis de Voyer de Paulmy d’Argenson, was born in Paris in September 1771. He was brought up by his father's cousin, Marc Antoine René, Marquis de Paulmy, governor of the arsenal, and was made lieutenant of dragoons in 1789. Although, at the age of eighteen, he had succeeded to several estates and a large fortune, he embraced the revolutionary cause, joining the army of the North as Lafayette's aide-de-camp and remaining with it even after Lafayette's defection. Leaving France to take one of his sisters to England, he was denounced on his return as a royalist conspirator, on the charge of having in his possession portraits of the royal family.

He then went to live in Touraine, married the widow of Prince Victor de Broglie, and saved her and her children from proscription. He introduced new agricultural instruments and processes on his estates, and installed machinery imported from England in his ironworks in Alsace.

He was an enthusiastic adherent of Napoleon, by whom he was appointed in May 1809 prefect of Deux-Nèthes. He helped to repel the English invasion of the islands of South Beveland and Walcheren (August 1809), and afterwards directed the defence works of Antwerp, but resigned this post (March 1813) in consequence of the complaints of the inhabitants and the exacting demands of the Emperor. In May 1814 he refused the prefecture of Marseille offered to him by the Bourbons, but was elected deputy from Belfort in 1815 during the Hundred Days.

On 5 July 1815 d'Argenson took part in the declaration protesting against any tampering with the immutable rights of the nation. He was a member of the Chambre introuvable, where he became one of the orators of the democratic party. He was one of the founders of the journal Le Censeur Européen and of the Club de la liberté de la presse, and was an uncompromising opponent of reaction. Not re-elected in 1824 on account of his liberal ideas, he returned to the chamber under the Martignac Ministry (1828), and resolutely persisted in his championship of the liberty of the press and of public worship. On the death of his wife he voluntarily renounced his mandate (July 1829), and hailed the revolution of 1830 with great satisfaction.

On 3 November 1830 d'Argenson was elected to the chamber as deputy from Châtellerault, and took the oath, adding, however, the reservation "subject to the progress of the public reason". His independent attitude resulted in his defeat in the following year at the Châtellerault election, but he was returned for Strasbourg. He wished the incidence of the taxes to be arranged according to social condition, and advocated a single tax proportionate to income like the English income tax. He harped incessantly on this idea in his speeches and articles.

Although d'Argenson was a proprietor of ironworks he opposed the protectionist laws, which he considered injurious to the workmen. He became the mouthpiece of the advanced ideas; subsidized the opposition newspapers, especially Le National; received into his house Philippe Buonarroti, who in 1796 had been implicated in the conspiracy of "Gracchus" (François Noel Babeuf); and became a member of the committee of the Society of the Rights of Man. He was even sued in the courts for a pamphlet called Boutade d’un homme riche à sentiments populaires, and delivered a speech to the jury in which he displayed very daring social theories. But he gradually grew discouraged and retired from public affairs, refusing even municipal office, and living in seclusion at La Grange in the forest of Guerche, where he devoted his inventive faculty to devising agricultural improvements. He subsequently returned to Paris, where he died on 1 August 1842.
