= Paulette (tax) =

Tax levied under the Ancien Régime

La Paulette (French pronunciation: [la polɛt]; after the financier Charles Paulet, who proposed it) was the name commonly given to the "annual right" (droit annuel), a special tax levied by the French Crown under the Ancien Régime. It was first instituted on December 12, 1604, by King Henry IV's minister Maximilien de Béthune, duc de Sully.

The paulette was a tax on the holders of various government and judicial offices, paid to the Crown, and initially set at an annual payment of one-sixtieth of the value of each office. Paying the paulette secured the right of the officeholder to transfer his office at will.

The transmission of judicial offices had been a common practice in France since the late Middle Ages. By the beginning of the sixteenth century the practice had extended to almost all levels of the ever-increasing Renaissance state administration (such as seats in the Parlements), and played an important role in state finances. Custom had permitted an officer to transfer his office to his heir (résignation) with royal permission in return for the payment of a fee. Before it was made illegal in 1521, it had been possible to leave open-ended the date that the transfer was to take effect. In 1534, the "forty days rule" was instituted (adapted from church practice), which made the successor's right void if the preceding office holder died within forty days of the transfer (in which case the office reverted to the state); however, a new fee, called the survivance jouissante, protected against the forty days rule. Still, the new office holder had to meet the minimum qualifications needed for the office or else the office went back to the crown. The paulette was a modification of this rule, which substituted an annual tax as protection against the "forty days rule".

The paulette provided the Crown with a steady source of revenue while consolidating the practice of hereditary government offices. This left the administration of justice in France in the hands of a new and increasingly powerful hereditary class of magistrates, which came to be known as the noblesse de robe ("nobility of the gown"), in contrast with the traditional aristocracy, known as the noblesse d'épée ("nobility of the sword", whose position derived from feudal military service). This system was abolished after the French Revolution.

While the paulette provided revenue for the Crown, the salaries of government officials stressed the royal funds and forced the Crown to tax the lower classes heavily. During the rule of Louis XIV, his minister of finance Jean Baptiste Colbert expanded the creation and sale of offices to raise money without new taxation.
