= École royale du génie de Mézières =

Military engineering school in Charleville-Mézières, France

Coordinates: 49.7615°N 4.7201°E

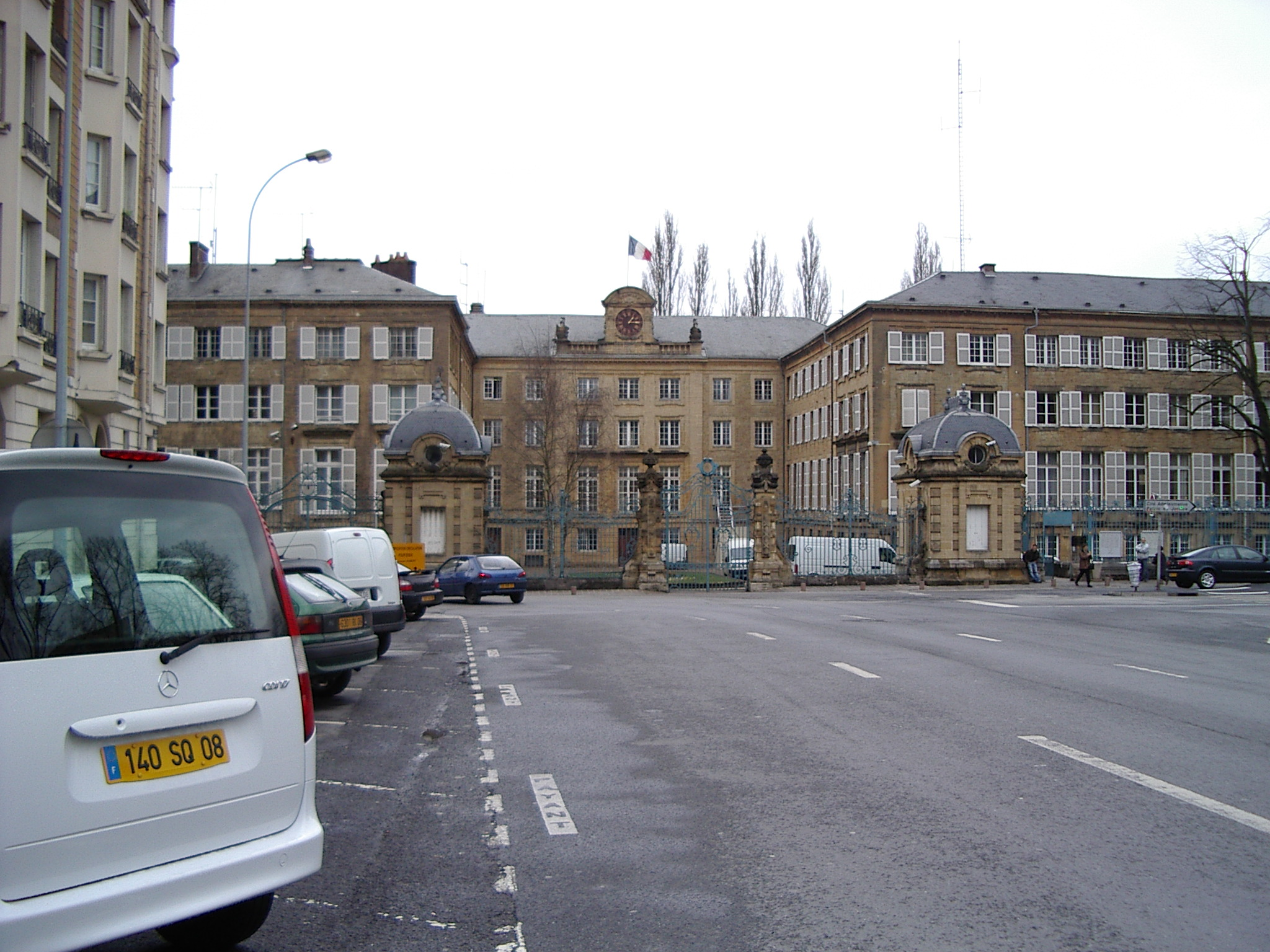
The Hôtel du Département des Ardennes

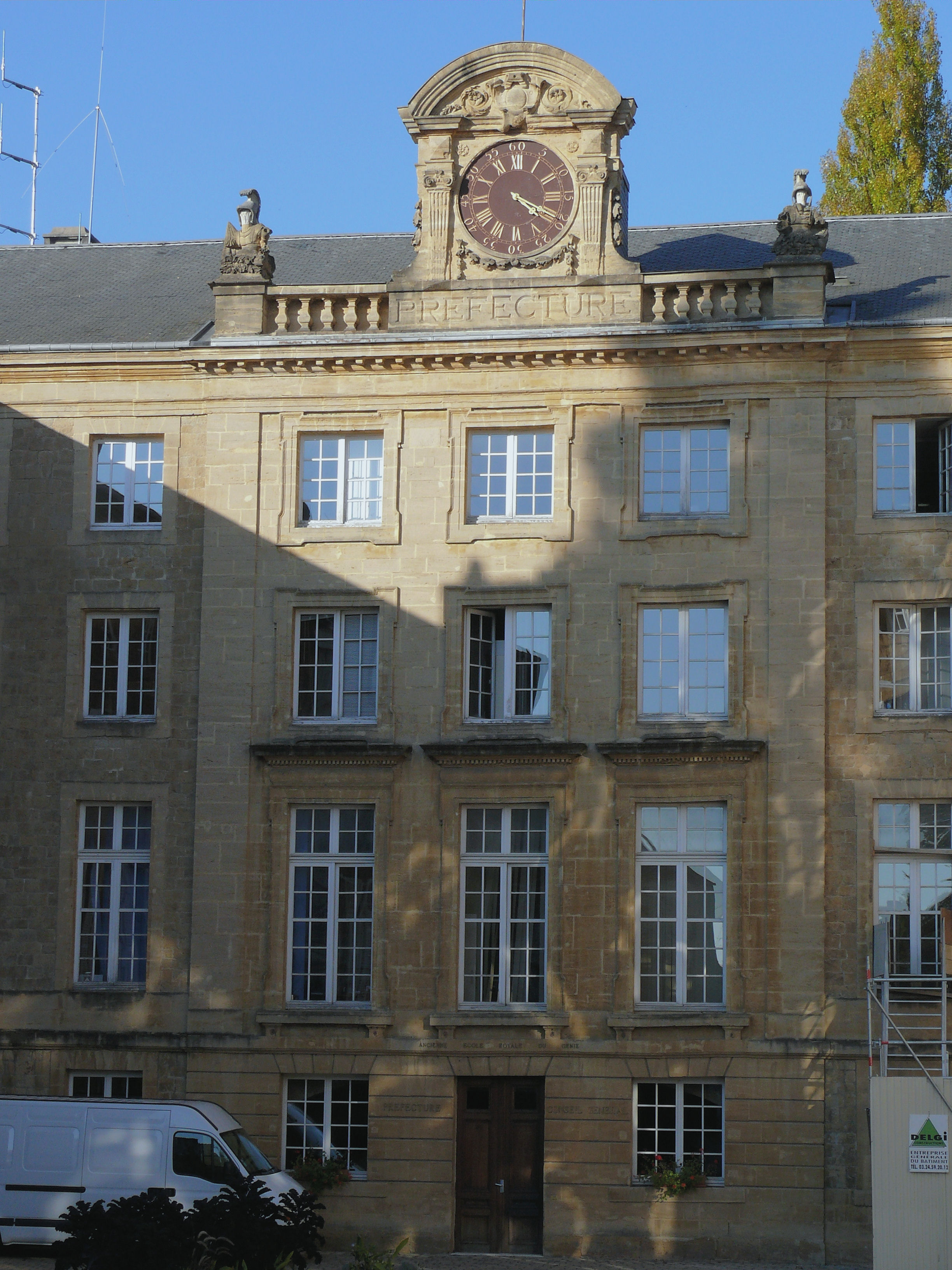
The Hôtel du Département des Ardennes

The École royale du génie de Mézières (Royal Engineering School of Mézières) was a military engineering school in what is now Charleville-Mézières, France. It was founded in 1748 on proposal of the comte d'Argenson, then Secretary of state for War, and Brigadier Nicolas de Chastillon, commander of the citadel at Charleville-Mézières, with the aim of modernizing the town's fortifications. It trained a total of 542 military engineers until its merging with the École d'Application de l'Artillerie de Metz during the Reign of Terror. Since 1800 its buildings have housed the Hôtel du Département des Ardennes, which manages the Ardennes department.

== Building ==
It was housed in the palais des Tournelles, the residence for the governor of Mézières. Philip III of Burgundy built the first palais des Tournelles in 1409, which was rebuilt by Louis Gonzaga, Duke of Nevers in 1566. Henry III of France lodged at the palais in 1583 and after being largely destroyed by fire in 1697 it was again rebuilt in 1732.

The school moved in 1753 and was promoted to a royal school on 31 December 1776. The present building was built between 1780 and 1789. In October 1791 its students met La Fayette. It was transferred to Metz in 1793 before being suppressed the following year.
