= Marc Antoine René de Voyer =

French ambassador

Antoine-René de Voyer Marquis de Paulmy & Marquis d'Argenson
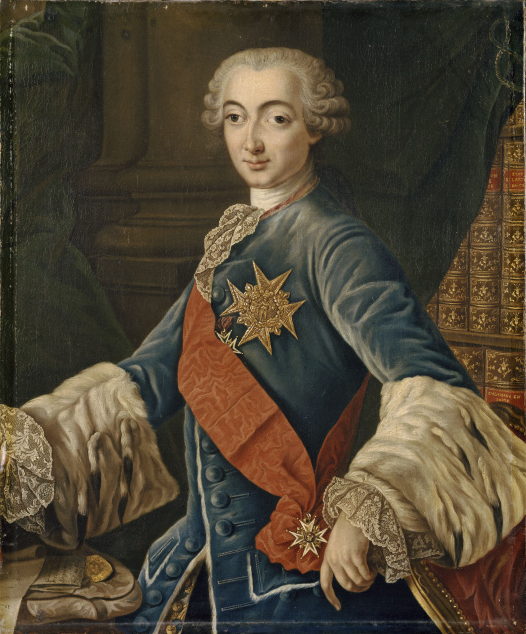

Secretary of State for War
- In office 3 February 1757 – 4 March 1758
- Preceded by: Marc-Pierre de Voyer de Paulmy d'Argenson
- Succeeded by: Charles Louis Auguste Fouquet

Personal details
- Born: 22 November 1722; Valenciennes, Hainaut, Kingdom of France
- Died: 13 August 1787 (aged 64); Paris, Isle-de-France, Kingdom of France
- Awards: Order of the Holy Spirit; Order of Saint Michael

Marc Antoine René de Voyer, Marquis de Paulmy and Marquis d'Argenson (1757) (22 November 1722, Valenciennes – 13 August 1787), was a French ambassador to Switzerland, the Polish–Lithuanian Commonwealth, the Republic of Venice and to the Holy See, and later became the Minister of War. He was also a noted bibliophile and collector of art.

== Biography ==
Marc Antoine René de Voyer was the only son of René-Louis de Voyer de Paulmy, marquis d' Argenson. He should not be confused with his grandfather, Marc-René, or his great-grandfather, also Marc-René, or in particular with his cousin Marc-René de Voyer d'Argenson (1721–1782).

Appointed councillor at the parlement (1744), and maître des requêtes (1747), he was associated with his father in the ministry of foreign affairs and with his uncle, Marc-Pierre, in the ministry of war, and, in recognition of this experience, was commissioned to inspect the troops and fortifications and sent on embassy to Switzerland (1748).

In 1750 he was appointed to head the stables of King Louis XV and appointed governor of the Château de Vincennes in 1754. In addition to Switzerland, he served as French ambassador to Poland, Venice and to the Holy See. He followed his uncle as war minister when the latter was forced from office by the influence of Madame de Pompadour in 1757. The outbreak of the Seven Years' War made this post exceedingly difficult to hold, and he resigned on 23 March 1758.

He was a noted bibliophile and collector of art, whose private hope, reported in his memoirs was to be appointed director of the Bâtiments du Roi, a post that devolved upon Mme de Pompadour's highly competent brother. He built a château at Asnières in 1750, with expenses that scandalized his virtuous uncle, to set the tone for the Court and display his collection of works by Northern Renaissance masters. In the decade 1748–58 he appears repeatedly in the daybook of the marchand-mercier Lazare Duvaux, often purchasing Chinese celadon porcelains set in rococo French gilt-bronze mounts, and even bringing to Duvaux fine examples from his own collection to be mounted according to his taste. He was compelled by financial troubles to sell the house in 1769.

His library was one of the finest collections of a private individual. It included some 100,000 carefully selected volumes, largely by French writers and especially poets. He catalogued the library himself, dictating or writing the documents which display his expertise and taste. The library was purchased in 1785 by the Count of Artois, brother of the king, who allowed Argenson to retain it his lifetime. This library formed the basis of the Bibliothèque de l'Arsenal since, as grand master of artillery, he had used the Arsenal to house his library.

== Literary works and academic positions ==
He planned the Bibliothèque universelle des romans, published between 1775 and 1778 in 40 octavo volumes, a collection of novels including some of his own writing. His own novellas were published in 1782 as Choix de petits romans de différents genres. He also produced the Mélanges tirés d'une grande bibliothèque (69 volumes, 1779 to 1787) containing extracts from his library. At his death he forbade his library to be dispersed: it was bought by the comte d’Artois (afterwards Charles X) and formed the nucleus of the Bibliothèque de l'Arsenal (now the Bibliothèque nationale de France) in Paris. His collection of publications from the German-speaking area was supplied by the Strasbourg publishing house Bauer, Treuttel and Würtz.

He was elected to the Académie française in 1748 and also to the Academy of Sciences and the Académie des Inscriptions et Belles-Lettres.

== Notes ==
Political offices
Preceded by Marc-Pierre de Voyer de Paulmy, comte d'Argenson	Secretary of State for War; 1757–1758	Succeeded by Charles Louis Auguste Fouquet de Belle-Isle
