= Nobles of the Sword =

France nobility through the Middle Ages and Renaissance

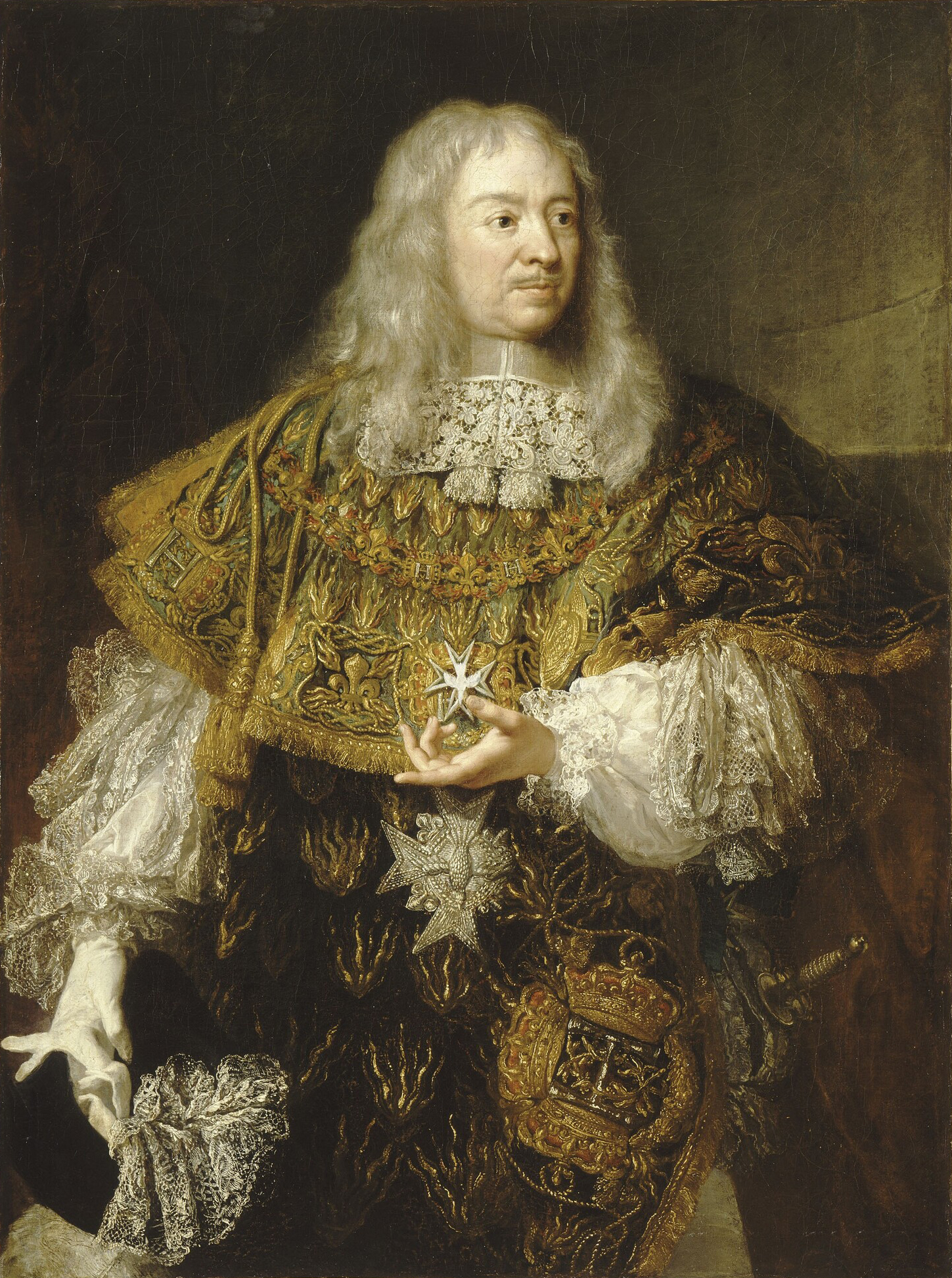
Gabriel de Rochechouart, father of Madame de Montespan, was a member of the House of Rochechouart, one of the oldest French noble families.

The Nobles of the Sword (French: noblesse d'épée) were the noblemen of the oldest class of nobility in France dating from the Middle Ages and the early modern period, and arguably still in existence by descent. It was originally the knightly class whose members owed military service, usually to a king (to the King of France typically but in some cases to other monarchs such as the Plantagenet kings of England) in return for the possession of feudal landed estates in the king's realm. They played an important part during the French Revolution since their attempts to retain their old power monopoly caused the new nobility's interests to align with the newly arising French bourgeoisie class, creating a powerful force for change in French society in the late 18th century. For the year 1789, Gordon Wright gives a figure of 80,000 nobles.

== Background ==
The term noblesse d'épée is largely synonymous with noblesse de race ("nobility of family") and noblesse ancienne ("old nobility"), and it is used in distinction from the other classes of the French nobility:

- noblesse de chancellerie ("nobility of chancery") – those holding certain high offices under the king
- noblesse de lettres ("nobility of letters") – those ennobled by the king's letters patent
- noblesse de robe ("nobility of the robe") – those holding certain official positions, such as maître des requêtes, treasurer or president of a parlement
- noblesse de cloche ("nobility of the bell") or noblesse échevinale ("nobility of the chain") – échevins (mayors) or prévôts des marchands (merchants' provosts) in certain important towns, including Paris, Angers, Angoulême, Bourges, Lyon, Toulouse, Perpignan, and Poitiers
- noblesse militaire ("military nobility") – officers holding commissions in the army or navy who were not by descent members of the noblesse d'épée

As with the term "officer of the sword", the expression "nobles of the sword" derives from the right of such noblemen to bear a sword, which reflected their duty of knightly service to their feudal overlord.

In later centuries, a nobleman of the sword was not recognized as such unless his family had held this status for at least three generations. The nobility of the sword also provided non-military services to the king, holding positions in all branches of government.

However, from the Renaissance onwards, kings upset the old nobility by the creation of a new "nobility of the robe", the first such men coming into the nobility through their own merit, by being appointed to various judicial or administrative offices, and later members buying the offices which carried such status. This angered the nobles of the sword, who saw their own opportunities being lost to the bourgeoisie.

In the 17th century, the nobility of the sword began to demand that the new nobility of the robe be limited in its access to the court. To maximize its income, however, the government continued to sell even more positions, which caused conflict between the two groups of the nobility.

The trend had other benefits for the monarchy, as it reduced the power of the old nobility and made it less able to revolt against the Crown. However, the nobility of the sword continued to provide much of the officer class of the French army and navy, thus the kings of France needed to maintain good relations with them. Also, many such noblemen saw the importance of maintaining strong relations with the monarch and courting his good will, and so remained at court.

== Distinctions among the nobility ==
The French nobility was always divided into those who had the right to carry a sword and those who did not. In the 17th century, the nobles of the robe did not have this right, making the distinction between the nobility of the sword and the nobility of the robe very clear. Nobles of the sword, who had greater prestige, were given control of the French provinces and were seen to hold power at Versailles. The members of the nobility of the robe, however, bought their positions, and had a higher income than most nobles of the sword. Lower-ranking noblemen were thus able to gain a higher status by military service.

== Estates of the realm ==
There were three "estates" of the Estates General, France's parliament, and each represented a different class. The First Estate was the clergy, and the Second Estate was the nobility. The nobles of the sword traditionally had more power than the nobles of the robe. Their inherent position was derived from the military service they owed to the king in return for possession of their land-holdings, which were passed from father to son; but they also held official positions in provincial and national government, and at court. The Third Estate was the commoners, with representatives sent from the bonnes villes ("good towns") around the country, generally market towns, and while the electorate was limited, it included some men sent from surrounding villages. While the most numerous class in France was the peasantry, it was hardly represented in the Estates General, if at all.

Under King Louis XIV, the nobles of the robe largely replaced the nobles of the sword at the Palace of Versailles. The nobles of the robe were dependent on salaries paid by the king, so their votes would always favour the policy the king pursued. The nobility of the sword, with its greater independence, its ancestry, and its exemption from taxes, had great social prestige, but it generally had a significantly lower income than the nobility of the robe, and its votes were less committed to supporting the king and his government.

The nobles of the robe were in effect rich bourgeois and aspired to have the same privileges and exemptions as the first and second estates, in particular the exemption from paying taxes. This created conflict between the different branches of the nobility, with the nobles of the sword feeling entitled to special treatment, because of their long history and well-established rights and privileges. This division weakened the balance of power before the revolution and led to much criticism from the Third Estate, the commoners.

== See also ==
- Uradel
