= French Hainaut =

Historic French province

Coordinates: 50.20°N 3.80°E

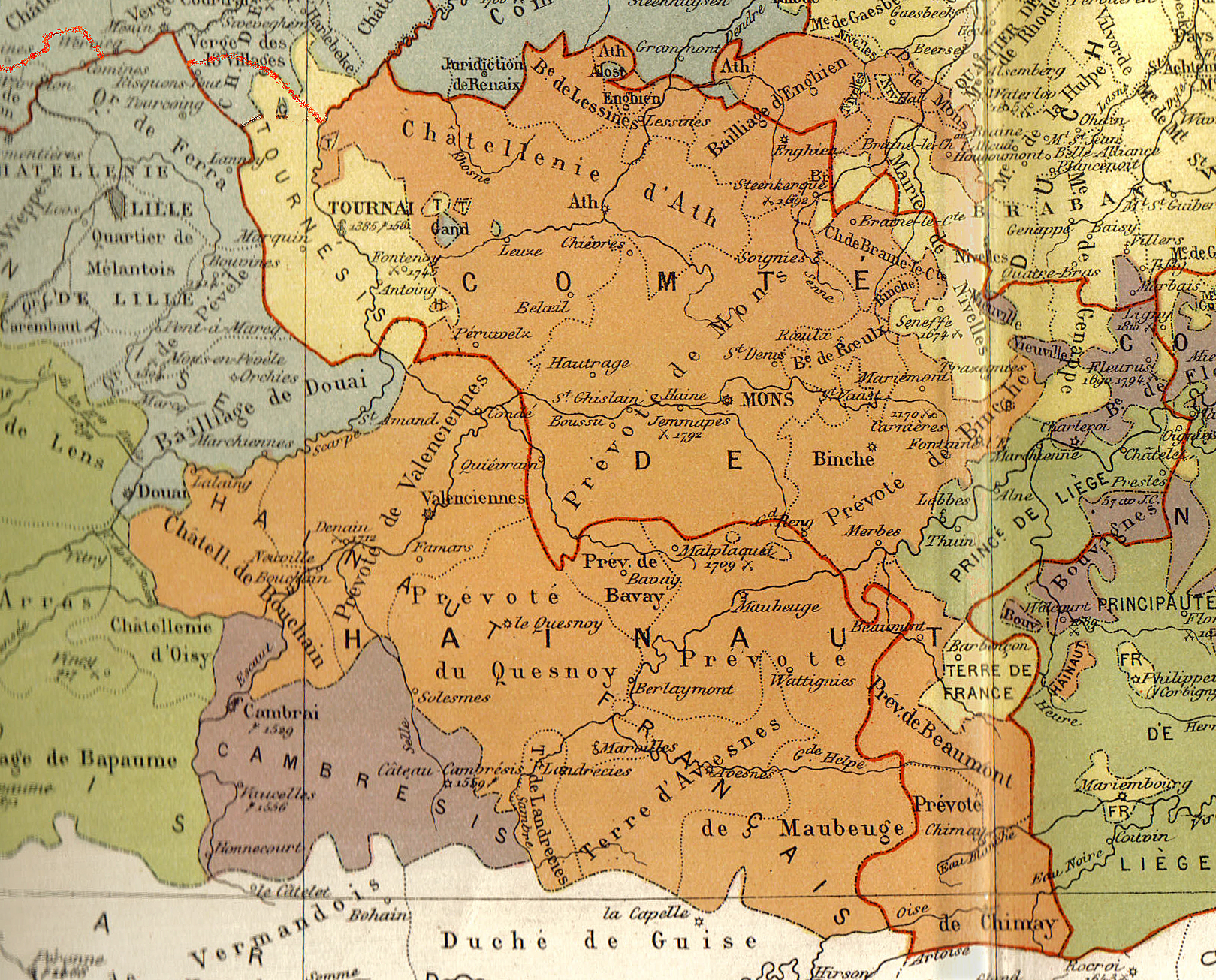
Map of the County of Hainaut, with the current French-Belgian border in red. French Hainaut is the southern part.

French Hainaut (French: Hainaut français [ɛno fʁɑ̃sɛ]) is one of two areas in France that form the département du Nord, making up its eastern part. It corresponds roughly with the Arrondissement of Avesnes-sur-Helpe (east), the Arrondissement of Cambrai (south-west) and the Arrondissement of Valenciennes (north-west).

Until the 17th century, it was an integral part of the County of Hainaut, ruled by the House of Valois-Burgundy and later by the House of Habsburg. In a series of wars between France and Spain, this southern part of Hainaut was conquered by France, together with the adjacent Cambrésis, or Bishopric of Cambrai, to its south-west, and southern Flanders, which borders the English Channel, to its west. Together, these formed the French province of Flanders which, following the French Revolution, became the new Nord département.

Map of the new region Hauts-de-France, with its five départements, colored according to the historical provinces as they existed until 1790. Apart from the territories mentioned above in the text, tiny amounts of Artois and Picardy also contributed to the Nord département. Picardy Île-de-France Artois French Flanders French Hainaut Cambrai Champagne Other
