= Marc René, Marquis de Voyer de Paulmy d'Argenson =

French army officer

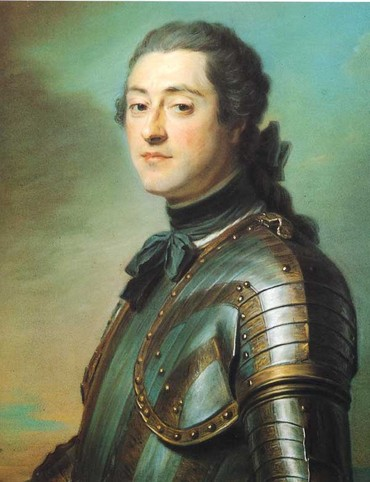
Marc René, Marquis de Voyer de Paulmy d’Argenson by Maurice Quentin de La Tour.

Marc René, Marquis de Voyer de Paulmy d'Argenson (1721–1782), known as the Marquis de Voyer was a French army officer.

== Biography ==
Marc René, the son of Marc-Pierre de Voyer de Paulmy d'Argenson, the Minister of War, was born in Paris on 20 September 1721.

René served in the army of Italy and the army of Flanders in the War of the Austrian Succession, and was Mestre de Camp (proprietary colonel) of the regiment of Berry cavalry at the Battle of Fontenoy (10 May 1745), where he was promoted to Brigadier. He was associated with his father in his work of reorganizing the army, was made Inspector of Cavalry and Dragoons (1749), and succeeded his father as Master of Horse (1752). He introduced English horses into France.

René was lieutenant-general of Upper Alsace in 1753 and governor of Vincennes in 1754, and served afterwards under Prince of Soubise in the Seven Years' War. He was wounded at the Battle of Crefeld in 1758, and was promoted to Lieutenant-General (1759).

He followed his father into exile on their country estate at Château des Ormes (1763), and in the last years of the reign of Louis XV. sided with the malcontents headed by Duke of Choiseul. However, upon the rupture with England he, rejoined the service of the King in 1775. He was appointed as Inspector of the Seaboard, and was responsible for putting the roadstead of the island of Aix into a state of defence during the American War of Independence.

He contracted malaria while attempting to drain the marshes of Rochefort, and died at Château des Ormes on 18 September 1782.

== Family ==
René was married and had at least one son, Marc-René de Voyer de Paulmy d'Argenson (1771–1842).
