= Nobles of the Robe =

French aristocratic officeholders

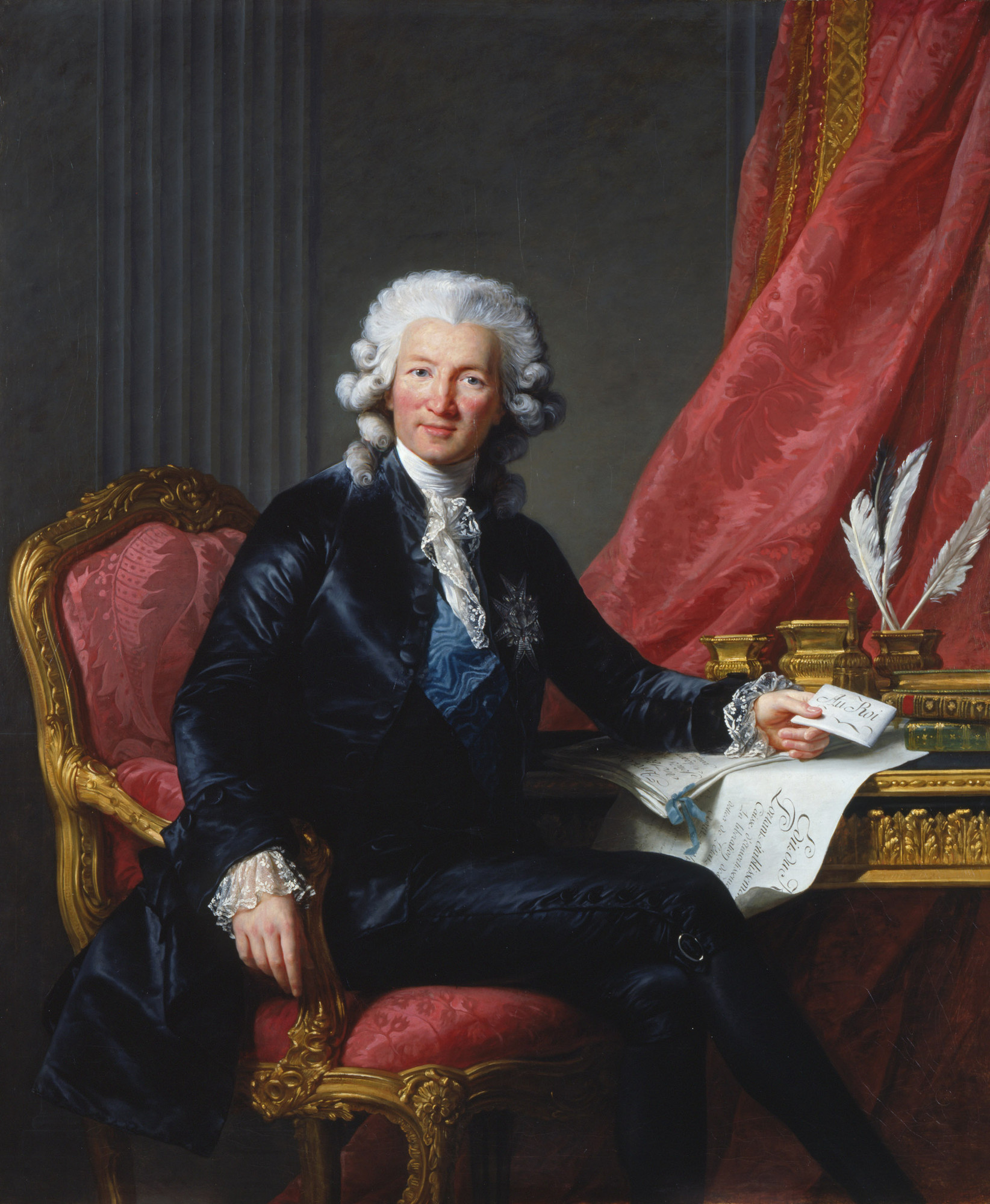
Charles-Alexandre de Calonne by Élisabeth-Louise Vigée-Le Brun (1784), London, Royal Collection. Calonne is shown in the costume of his rank, noblesse de robe.

Under the Ancien Régime of France, the Nobles of the Robe or Nobles of the Gown (French: noblesse de robe) were French aristocrats whose rank came from holding certain judicial or administrative posts. As a rule, the positions did not of themselves give the holder a title of nobility, such as baron or viscount (although the holder might also have such a title), but they were almost always attached to a specific function. The offices were often hereditary, and by 1789, most of the holders had inherited their positions. The most influential of them were the 1,100 members of the 13 parlements, or courts of appeal.

They were distinct from the "Nobles of the Sword" (French: noblesse d'épée), whose nobility was based on their families' traditional function as the knightly class and whose titles were usually attached to a particular feudal fiefdom, a landed estate held in return for military service. Together with the older nobility, the Nobles of the Robe made up the Second Estate in pre-revolutionary France.

== Origins ==
The term Nobles of the Robe first appeared in writing in 1603. This class originated in the 16th century, as a means of royal collaboration with the ascendant gentry.

Because these noblemen, especially the judges, had often studied at a university, they were called Nobles of the Robe after the robes or gowns that scholars wore, especially at commencement ceremonies. Originally given out as rewards for services to the king, the offices became venal, a commodity to be bought and sold (under certain conditions of aptitude). This practice became official with the edict of la Paulette, the Paulette being the tax paid by the holder to keep the office hereditary. As hereditary offices, they were often passed from father to son. Nobles of the Robe were often considered by Nobles of the Sword to be of inferior rank, because their status was not derived from military service and/or land ownership. The elite Nobles of the Robe, such as members of the parlements, fought to preserve their status alongside the Nobles of the Sword in pre-revolutionary French society.

Originally, the offices within the Nobles of the Robe were relatively accessible due to their venal nature. In the 17th century, the office of councillor in the parlement sold for 100,000 livres. By the mid-18th century, its value was reduced to half, due to the proliferation of offices. However, after the 17th century, the descendants of those who had earned the rank as a reward for services to the monarchy fought to limit access to the class. The Nobles of the Robe protested heavily when the monarchy, in desperate need of money, would create massive numbers of such positions within the bureaucracy to raise revenue. A common family strategy was to designate a second or third son to enter the church while the elder son(s) pursued a career in the robe or the military.

Access to nobility through a judiciary office thus became practically barred in the 18th century. However, there existed other offices for sale: a secrétaire-conseiller du roi acquired first-degree nobility immediately, and hereditary nobility after 20 years. The office was not cheap (120,000 livres in 1773), but it was a sinecure, with no preconditions and no obligations. Real nobility looked down on it as a savonette à vilain (the commoners' "soap", that is, means of "washing away" the commonness to create a nobleman).

Commoners mockingly referred to the Nobles of the Robe as "nobility of the pen and ink", and the old aristocracy regarded them as commoners. However, by the mid-17th century the two groups had blended and intermeshed sufficiently that it was common for a single family to have both kinds of nobles.

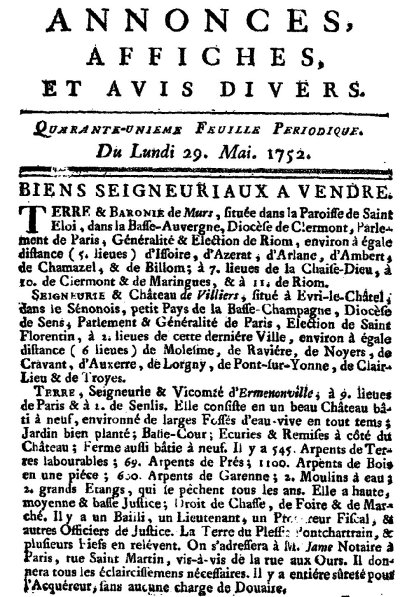
A new nobleman could acquire a fief and assume the title, which might need to be registered with the Estates.

In order to become a baron or viscount, a new untitled nobleman needed to acquire a fief (baronies, viscountcies, etc. were also sold as investment goods) and to add the name of the fief to his family name. For example, Antoine Crozat, having come from a wealthy family of commoners, acquired the barony of Thiers in 1714 for the price of 200,000 livres. In some parts of France, the new baron or viscount needed to be registered by the Estates (who could refuse, as did the Estates of Béarn for Vincent Laborde de Montpezat in 1703).

== The Enlightenment and the French Revolution ==
Nobles of the Robe played key roles in the French Enlightenment. The most famous, Montesquieu, was one of the earliest Enlightenment figures.

During the French Revolution, the Nobles of the Robe lost their place when the parlements and lower courts were abolished in 1790.

== See also ==
- Law lord
- Parlement
