= Marc-René de Voyer de Paulmy d'Argenson (1652–1721) =

French politician

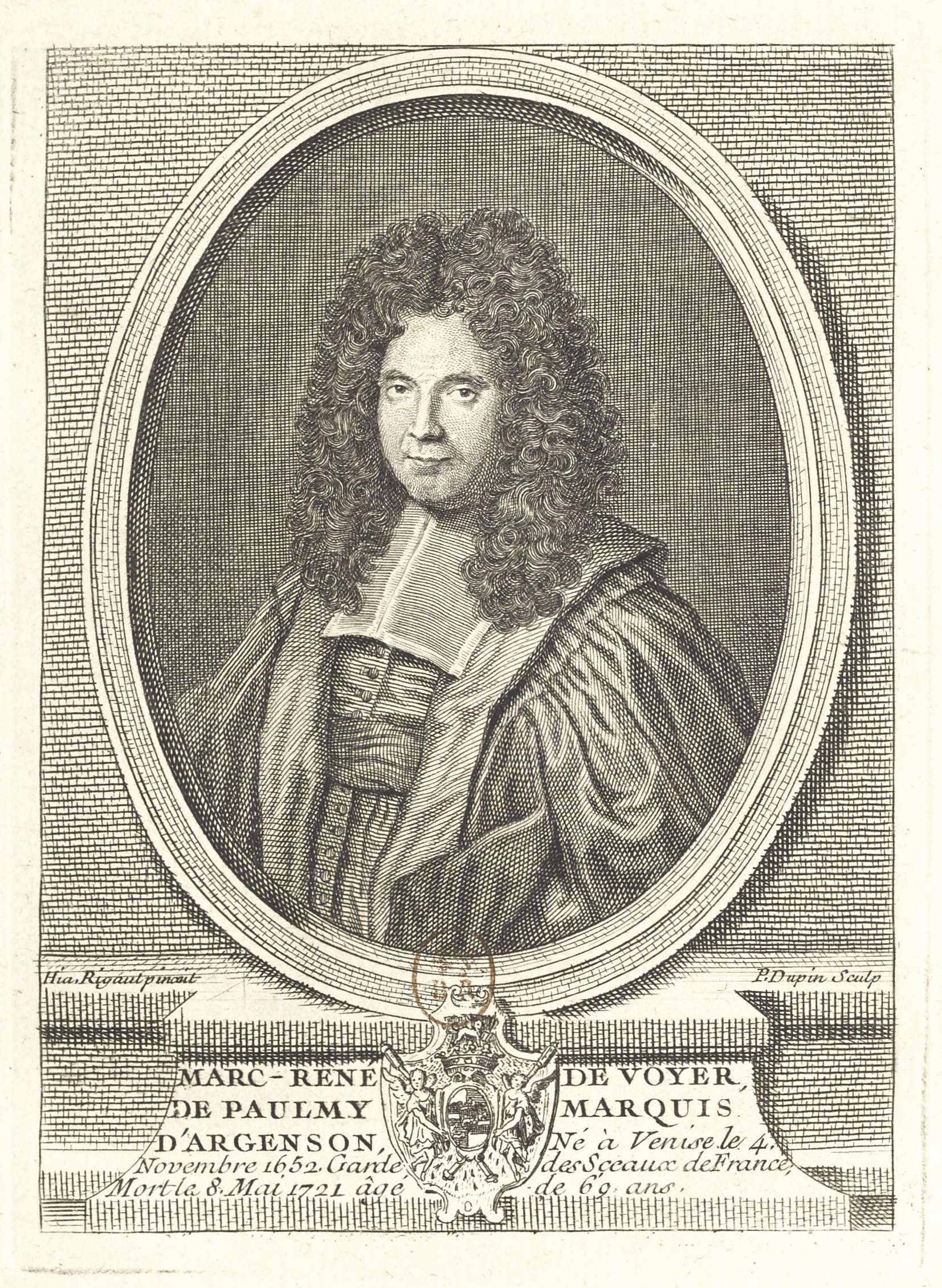
- Born: 4 November 1652; Venice, Republic of Venice
- Died: 8 May 1721 (aged 68); Paris, France

Marc-René de Voyer de Paulmy, marquis d’Argenson (Note: French pronunciation: [maʁk ʁəne də vwaje də polmi daʁʒɑ̃sɔ̃]) (4 November 1652 – 8 May 1721) was a French politician.

== Biography ==
D'Argenson was born in Venice on 4 November 1652, where his father, also Marc-René, was ambassador. According to tradition, he was declared a godson of the Venetian Republic which accounted for the name Marc (Saint Mark being the patron saint of Venice).

D'Argenson became avocat in 1669, and lieutenant-general in the sénéchaussée of Angoulême (1679). After the death of Colbert, who disliked his family, he went to Paris and married Marguerite Lefèvre de Caomartin, a kinswoman of the comptroller-general Pontchartrain. This was the beginning of his fortunes. He became successively maître des requêtes (1694), member of the conseil des prises (prize court) (1695), procureur-général of the commission of inquest into false titles of nobility (1696).

In 1697, d'Argenson became lieutenant-general of police. This office, which had previously been filled by Gabriel Nicolas de la Reynie, was very important. It not only gave him the control of the police, but also the supervision of the corporations, printing press, and provisioning of Paris. All contraventions of the police regulations came under his jurisdiction, and his authority was arbitrary and absolute. Fortunately, he had, in Saint-Simon's phrase:

a nice discernment as to the degree of rigour or leniency required for every case that came before him, being ever inclined to the mildest measures, but possessed of the faculty of making the most innocent tremble before him; courageous, bold, audacious in quelling êmeutes, and consequently the master of the people.

During the twenty-one years that d’Argenson served as lieutenant-general of police, he was involved in every significant private and state matter, playing a role in nearly all important events in the history of Paris. He was a familiar figure to Louis XIV, who took interest in police reports, enjoyed the patronage of Philippe, Duke of Orleans, received support from the Jesuits at court, and was feared by many.

D'Argenson organized the supply of food in Paris during the severe winter of 1709, and endeavoured, but with little success, to run to earth the libellers of the government. He directed the destruction of the Jansenist monastery of Port Royal (1709), a proceeding which provoked many protests and pamphlets. In 1716, he was created an honorary member of the Académie des Sciences and, in 1718, a member of the French Academy.

Under the Régence, the Chambre de Justice, assembled to inquire into the malpractices of the financiers, suspected d’Argenson and arrested his clerks, but dared not lay the blame on him. On 28 January 1718, he voluntarily resigned the office of lieutenant-general of police for those of keeper of the seals—in the place of the chancellor d’Aguesseau—and president of the council of finance. He was appointed by the regent to suppress the resistance of the parlements and to reorganize the finances, and was in great measure responsible for permitting John Law to apply his financial system, though he soon quarrelled with Law and intrigued to bring about his downfall.

The regent (the Duke of Orleans) threw the blame for the outcome of Law's schemes (see the Mississippi Bubble) on d’Argenson, who was forced to resign his position in the council of finance (January 1720). By way of compensation he was created inspector-general of the police of the whole kingdom, but had to resign his office of keeper of the seals (June 1720). He died on 8 May 1721, the people of Paris throwing taunts and stones at his coffin and accusing him of having ruined the kingdom.

== Family ==
Argenson had two sons, René-Louis and Marc-Pierre.
