= René de Voyer de Paulmy d'Argenson =

French diplomat

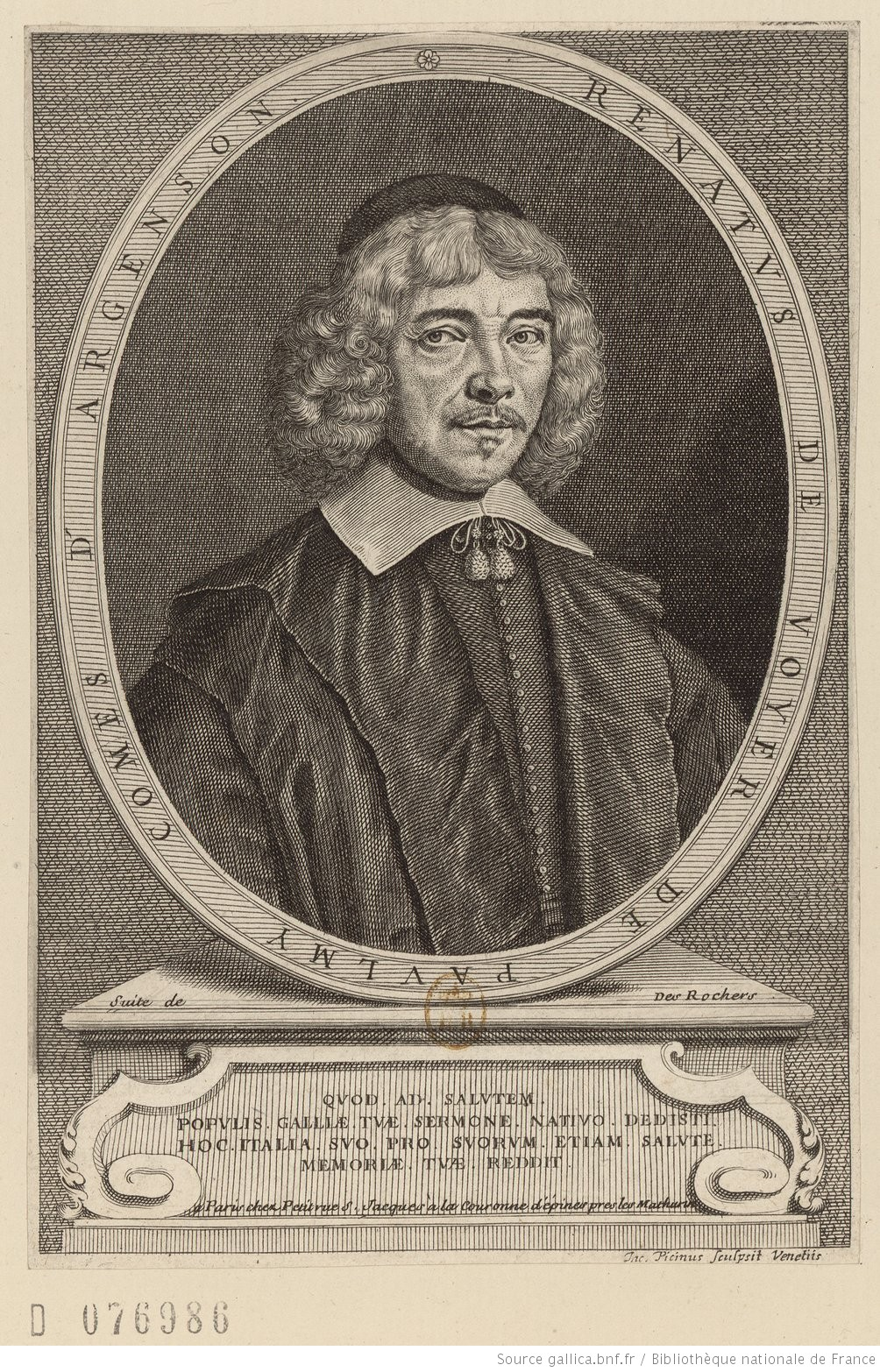
Portrait of René de Voyer

René de Voyer, seigneur d’Argenson (1596–1651) was a French diplomat.

== Biography ==
René de Voyer was the grandson of René de Voyer, seigneur de Paulmy et de la Roche de Gennes, and of Jeanne Gueffault, dame d'Argenson. His father, Pierre, was the head of the comtes d'Argenson branch of the family. He was born on 21 November 1596.

René de Voyer was a lawyer by profession, and became successively avocat, councillor at the parlement de Paris, maître des requêtes, and councillor of state. Cardinal Richelieu entrusted him with several missions as inspector and intendant of the forces. In 1623 he was appointed intendant of justice, police and finance in Auvergne, and in 1632 held similar office in Limousin, where he remained until 1637.

After the death of Louis XIII in 1643, René de Voyer retained his administrative posts, was intendant of the forces at Toulon (1646), commissary of the king at the estates of Languedoc (1647), and intendant of Guienne (1648), and showed great capacity in defending the authority of the crown against the rebels of the Fronde. After his wife’s death he took orders (February 1651), but did not cease to take part in affairs of state. In 1651 he was appointed by Mazarin ambassador at Venice, where he died on 14 July 1651. He was buried in the church of San Giobbe in the city, with a tomb by Thomas Blanchet.

== Family ==
René de Voyer had seven children. His eldest son Marc-René de Voyer de Paulmy d'Argenson (1623-1700) followed him as French ambassador to Venice. Among his other children was Pierre de Voyer d'Argenson, vicomte de Mouzay, governor general of New France.

== Works ==
- De la Sagesse chrétienne (On Christian Wisdom, 1640), translated into many languages.
