= Master of Requests (France) =

French public office

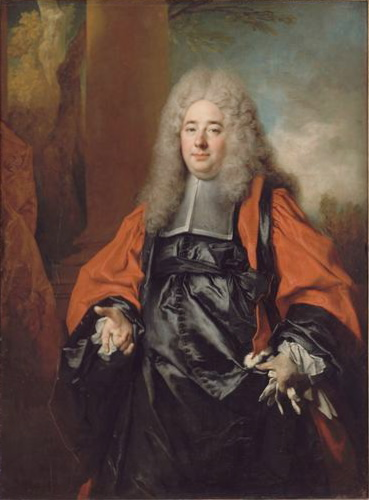
Louis-Urbain Le Peletier, Master of Requests by Nicolas de Largillière (1656–1746) Palace of Versailles

A Master of Requests (French: maître des requêtes) is a counsel of the French Conseil d'État (Council of State), a high-level judicial officer of administrative law in France. The office has existed in one form or another since the Middle Ages.

The occupational title derives from two words. In jurisprudence and administration, the French term maître is an honorific for a barrister (a lawyer who acts in proceedings before a court of law), and requêtes are "appeals" or "petitions". (The legal term une requête civile is "a petition to an appellate court against a judgment.")

== Ancien Régime France ==
The Masters of Requests (Counsels of State), more fully maîtres des requêtes ordinaires de l'hôtel du Roi, were originally, during the Middle Ages, judges of a council convened to examine petitions laid by commoners before the Royal Household (hôtel du roi). A number of traditions from this time survived until the 18th century, such as the King's accompaniment by two Masters ordinarily on Sundays and festival days, on his way to and from church, and their close attendance upon him during mass, so as to better receive petitions from the public.

The role of the Masters of Requests was greatly expanded during the Renaissance: their duties, as defined by the Edict of 1493, and subsequently modified during the reigns of Francis I and Henry II, were to serve as deputies to and work closely under the Lord Chancellor of France and provide royal oversight of the judicial system at all levels. In this way, the Masters of Requests became key to expanding royal power into the provinces and in national unification, a role that would be taken over in the 17th century by royal intendants, who were recruited from among the ranks of the Masters of Requests. The Masters toured on circuits to inspect provincial courts, and could preside over bailiwick courts, at the Grand Conseil, and at sittings of Parlement where they sat on equal footing as Presidents of Court. They also received petitions against royal officers and intervened in cases of abuse.

In addition to their judicial duties, they were occasionally given temporary financial or diplomatic tasks. They participated in the King's judicial and financial decisions and sat on the King's conseil privé. From their members were generally recruited other high-level royal officers and government officials, such as Councillors of State, provincial intendants of commerce or finance, the Comptroller-General, Lieutenant-General of Police, and so forth.

The Masters of Requests were chosen from among the best judges and members of the Parlements. As prestigious offices, they were sold and bought, although the King could also make appointments. Under Louis XIV, Masters' offices were extremely expensive, but they conferred nobility on the holder. (see French nobility)

Under Louis XII, there were six Masters of Requests; Francis increased their number to eighteen; Henry II to thirty-two. In the 17th century, there were generally eighty Masters of Requests, with numbers reaching eighty-eight in 1723, but Louis XV brought them back to eighty in 1752. They fell to sixty-seven members in 1787.

== Post-1799 France ==
The Masters of Requests (Counsels of State), or more fully maîtres des requêtes au Conseil d'État, are members of the French Council of State who fall between the rank of auditeur (junior counsellor) and Councillor of State.

== See also ==
- Ancien Régime
- Early modern France
- Master of Requests (disambiguation)
