= Marc Pierre de Voyer de Paulmy, Count of Argenson =

French politician (1696–1764)

Marc-Pierre de Voyer de Paulmy marquis de Paulmy, comte d'Argenson
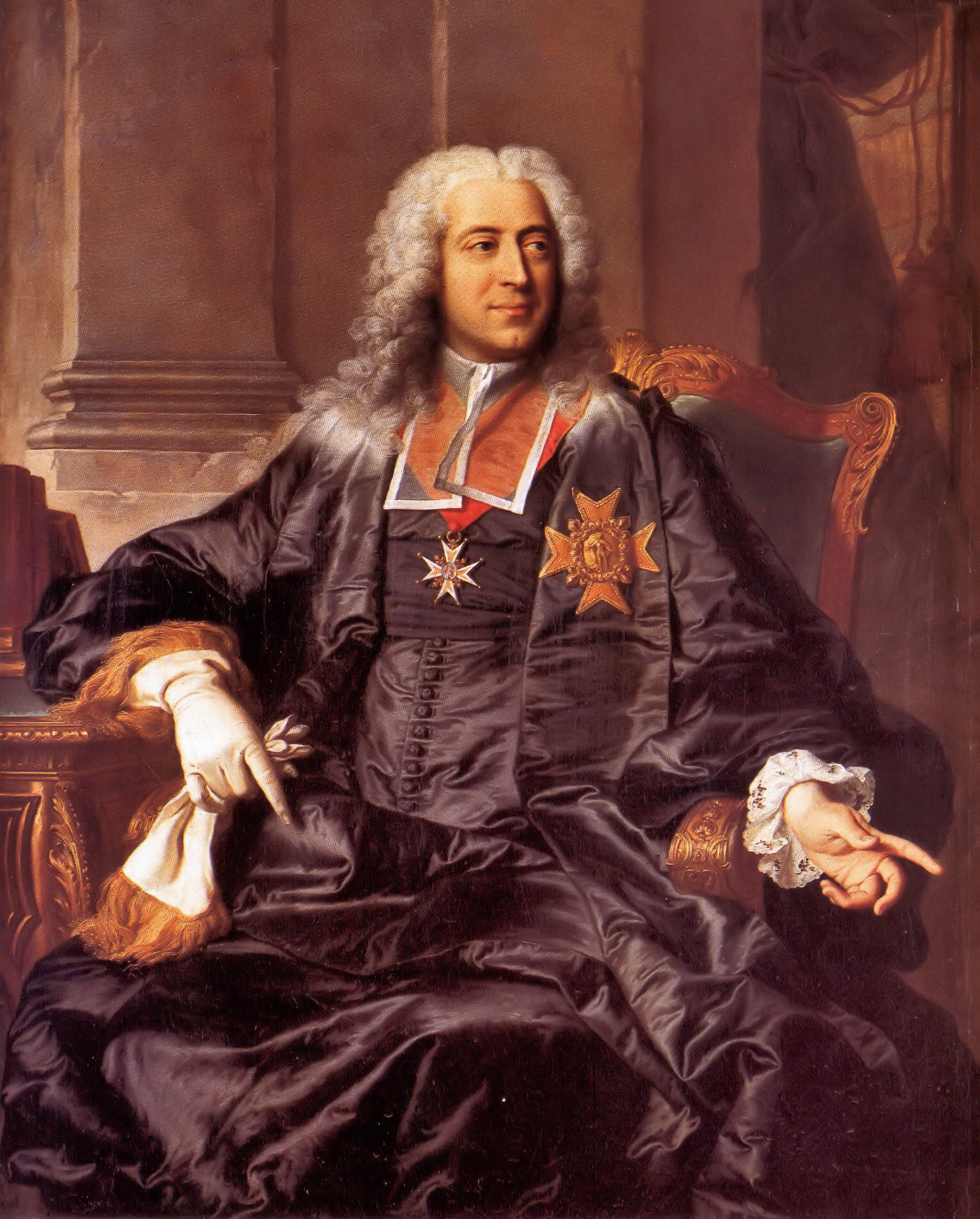
- Portrait by Hyacinthe Rigaud

Secretary of State for War
- In office 8 January 1743 – 2 February 1757
- Monarch: Louis XV
- Preceded by: François Victor Le Tonnelier de Breteuil
- Succeeded by: Marc Antoine René de Voyer

Personal details
- Born: 16 August 1696 Paris, Isle-de-France, Kingdom of France
- Died: 22 August 1764 (aged 68) Paris, Isle-de-France, Kingdom of France

Marc-Pierre de Voyer de Paulmy, comte d'Argenson (French: [maʁk pjɛʁ də vwaje]; 16 August 1696 – 22 August 1764) was a French politician.

== Biography ==
D'Argenson, a younger son of Marc-René de Voyer de Paulmy d'Argenson (1652–1721), was born on 16 August 1696. Following the family tradition he studied law and was councillor at the parlement of Paris. He succeeded his father as lieutenant-general of police in Paris, but held the post only five months (26 January to 30 June 1720). He then received the office of intendant of Tours, and resumed the lieutenancy of police in 1722.

On 2 January 1724 d'Argenson was appointed councillor of state. He gained the confidence of the regent Philippe, Duke of Orleans, administering his fortune and living with his son until 1737. During this period he opened his salon to the philosophers Chaulieu, the Marquis of la Fare and Voltaire, and collaborated in the legislative labours of the chancellor d'Aguesseau. He was also a close friend and confidant of the French Queen Marie Leszczyńska.

In March 1737 d'Argenson was appointed director of the censorship of books, in which post he showed sufficiently liberal views to gain the approval of writers—a rare thing in the reign of Louis XV. He only retained this post for a year. He became president of the grand council (November 1738), intendant of the généralité of Paris (August 1740), was admitted to the king's council (August 1742).

In January 1743 d'Argenson was appointed secretary of state for war in succession to Baron de Breteuil. As minister for war he had a heavy task; the French armies engaged in the War of the Austrian Succession were disorganized, and the retreat from Prague had produced a disastrous effect. After consulting with Marshal Saxe, he began the reform of the new armies. To assist recruiting, he revived the old institution of local militias, which, however, did not come up to his expectation. In the spring of 1744 three armies were able to resume the offensive in the Netherlands, Germany and Italy, and in the following year France won the Battle of Fontenoy, at which d'Argenson was present.

As part of a project to rationalise and standardise the military, he set up a new military engineering school in 1744, the École royale du génie at Charleville-Mézières, which still exists today. After the 1748 Treaty of Aix-la-Chapelle, other significant reforms included standardising the artillery, grouping Grenadiers into separate regiments, and setting up an officer training school, the École Militaire.

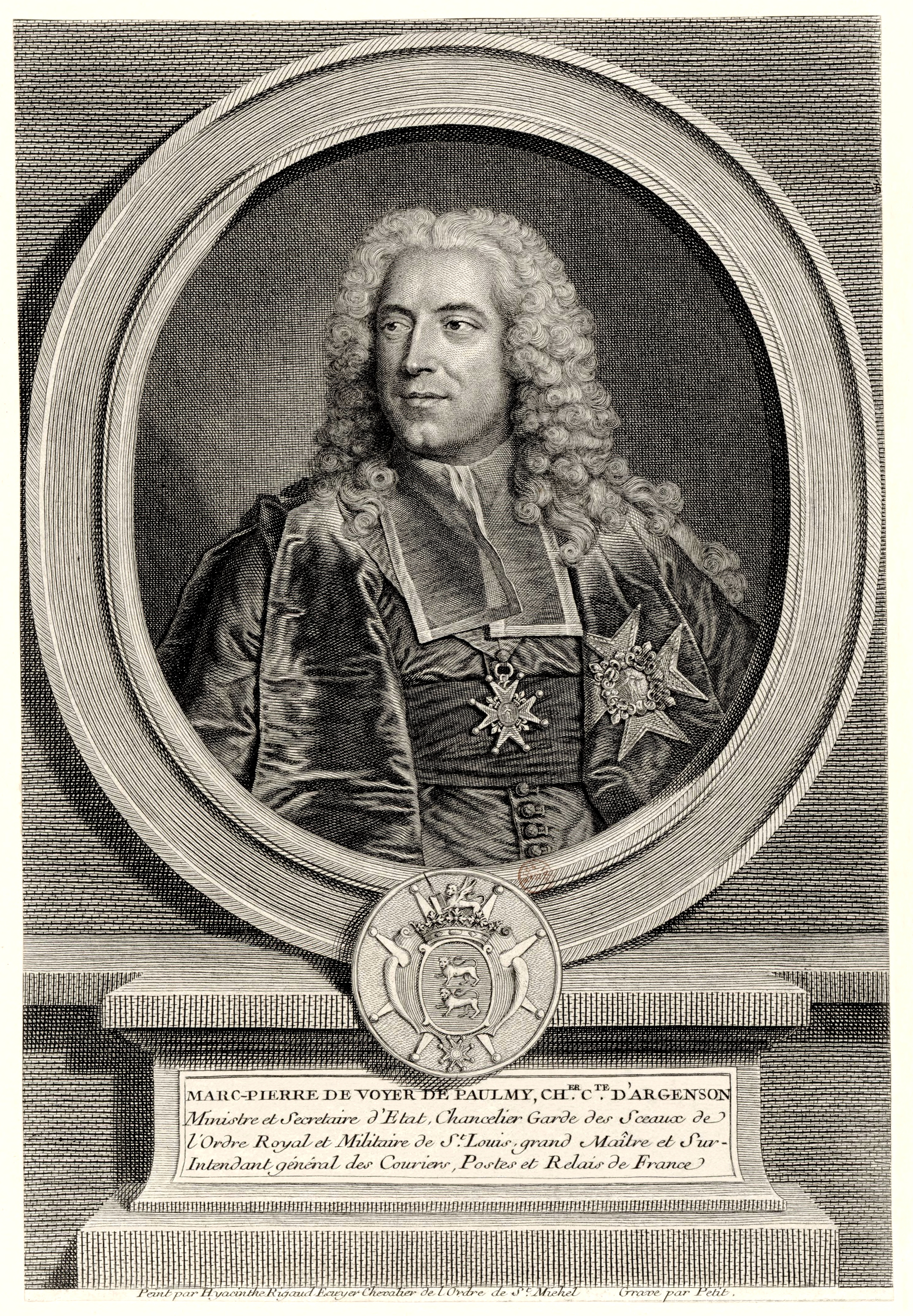
Marc-Pierre de Voyer de Paulmy d'Argenson

An edict of 1 November 1751 granted patents of nobility to all who had the rank of general officer. In addition to his duties as minister of war he had the supervision of the printing, postal administration and general administration of Paris. He was responsible for the arrangement of the promenade of the Champs Élysées and for the plan of the present Place de la Concorde. He was exceedingly popular, and, although the court favourites hated him, he had the support of the king. Nevertheless, after the attempt of Robert-François Damiens to assassinate King Louis XV, Louis abandoned d'Argenson to the machinations of the court favourites and dismissed both him and his colleague, the Comte d'Arnouville (February 1757).

D'Argenson was exiled to his château and estate at Les Ormes near Saumur, but he had previously found posts for his brother, René Louis, Marquis d'Argenson, as minister of foreign affairs, for his son Marc René as master of the horse, and for his nephew Marc Antoine René as commissary of war. From the time of his exile he lived in the society of savants and philosophers. He had been elected member of the Académie des Inscriptions in 1749. Diderot and d'Alembert dedicated the Encyclopédie to him, and Voltaire, Charles-Jean-François Hénault, and Jean-François Marmontel openly visited him in his exile. After the death of Madame de Pompadour he obtained permission to return to Paris, and died 22 August 1764, a few days after his return.

== Notes ==
Political offices
Preceded by François Victor le Tonnelier de Breteuil	Secretary of State for War; 1743–1757	Succeeded by Marc-René de Voyer, marquis de Paulmy
