= 12 Fantasias =

12 Fantasias may refer to:

- 12 Fantasias for Solo Flute (Telemann)
- 12 Fantasias for Solo Violin (Telemann)
- 12 Fantasias for Viola da Gamba (Telemann)
