= A major =

Major key and scale based on the note A

- Relative key: F-sharp minor
- Parallel key: A minor
- Dominant key: E major
- Subdominant key: D major

Component pitches
- A, B, C♯, D, E, F♯, G♯

A major is a major scale based on A, with the pitches A, B, C♯, D, E, F♯, and G♯. Its key signature has three sharps. Its relative minor is F-sharp minor and its parallel minor is A minor.

The A major scale is:

Changes needed for the melodic and harmonic versions of the scale are written in with accidentals as necessary. The A harmonic major and melodic major scales are:

In the treble, alto, and bass clefs, the G♯ in the key signature is placed higher than C♯. However, in the tenor clef, it would require a ledger line and so G♯ is placed lower than C♯.

== Scale degree chords ==
The scale degree chords of A major are:

- Tonic – A major
- Supertonic – B minor
- Mediant – C-sharp minor
- Subdominant – D major
- Dominant – E major
- Submediant – F-sharp minor
- Leading-tone – G-sharp diminished

== History ==
Although not as rare in the symphonic literature as sharper keys (those containing more than three sharps), symphonies in A major are less common than in keys with fewer sharps such as D major or G major. Beethoven's Symphony No. 7, Bruckner's Symphony No. 6 and Mendelssohn's Symphony No. 4 comprise a nearly complete list of symphonies in this key in the Romantic era. Mozart's Clarinet Concerto and Clarinet Quintet are both in A major, along with his 23rd Piano Concerto, and generally Mozart was more likely to use clarinets in A major than in any other key besides E-flat major. Moreover, the climax part of Tchaikovsky's Violin Concerto is also in A major.

The key of A occurs frequently in chamber music and other music for strings, which favor sharp keys. Franz Schubert's Trout Quintet and Antonín Dvořák's Piano Quintet No. 2 are both in A major. Johannes Brahms, César Franck, and Gabriel Fauré wrote violin sonatas in A major. In connection to Beethoven's Kreutzer Sonata, Peter Cropper said that A major "is the fullest sounding key for the violin."

According to Christian Friedrich Daniel Schubart, A major is a key suitable for "declarations of innocent love, ... hope of seeing one's beloved again when parting; youthful cheerfulness and trust in God."

For orchestral works in A major, the timpani are typically set to A and E a fifth apart, rather than a fourth apart as for most other keys. Hector Berlioz complained about the custom of his day in which timpani tuned to A and E a fifth apart were notated C and G a fourth apart, a custom which survived as late as the music of Franz Berwald.

== Notable compositions in A major ==
- Antonio Vivaldi
  - Trio Sonata, Op. 1/9 RV 75
  - Violin Sonata, Op. 2/2 RV 31
  - concerto for two violins, Op. 3/5 RV 519
  - concerto for violin, Op. 4/5 RV 347
  - Violin Sonata, Op. 5/2 RV 30
  - concerto for violin, Op. 9/2 RV 345
  - concerto for violin, Op. 9/6 RV 348
  - concerto for violin, Op. 11/3 RV 336
- Georg Philipp Telemann
  - Fantasia for flute solo, No. 1
  - Fantasia for violin solo, No. 5
  - Fantasia for viola da gamba solo, No. 8
  - Sonata for two flutes or two violins, No. 3
- Johann Sebastian Bach
  - English Suite No. 1, BWV 806
- Wolfgang Amadeus Mozart
  - Violin Concerto No. 5, K. 219
  - Symphony No. 29, K. 201
  - Symphony No. 21, K. 134
  - Violin Sonata No. 22, K. 305
  - Piano Sonata No. 11, K. 331
  - String Quartet No. 18, K. 464
  - Piano Concerto No. 23, K. 488
  - Là ci darem la mano, duettino form Don Giovanni, K. 527
  - Clarinet Quintet, K. 581
  - Clarinet Concerto, K. 622
- Ludwig van Beethoven
  - Symphony No. 7, Op. 92
  - Piano Sonata No. 2, Op. 2/2
  - Piano Sonata No. 28, Op. 101
  - Violin Sonata No. 6, Op. 30/1
  - Violin Sonata No. 9, Op. 47
  - Cello Sonata No. 3, Op. 69
  - String Quartet No. 5, Op. 18/5
- Franz Schubert
  - Trout Quintet
  - Piano Sonata, D 664
  - Piano Sonata No. 20, D. 959
- Fanny Hensel
  - Easter Sonata
- Felix Mendelssohn
  - Symphony No. 4, Op. 90 ("Italian")
  - Organ Sonata, Op. 65, No. 3
- Frédéric Chopin
  - Polonaise, Op. 40/1 ("Military")
  - Prelude, Op. 28/7
- Franz Liszt
  - Piano Concerto No. 2, S.125
- Johannes Brahms
  - Serenade No. 2, Op. 16
  - Violin Sonata No. 2, Op. 100 ("Thun")
  - Piano Quartet No. 2, Op. 26
- César Franck
  - Violin Sonata
- Anton Bruckner
  - Symphony No. 6
- Émile Waldteufel
  - Les Patineurs waltz, Op. 183
- Sergei Prokofiev
  - Piano Sonata No. 6, Op. 82
- Dmitri Shostakovich
  - String Quartet No. 2, Op. 68
  - Symphony No. 15, Op. 141

== See also ==
- Major and minor
- Chord (music)
- Chord notation

No.	Flats		Sharps	
No.	Major	minor	Major	minor
0	C	a	C	a
1	F	d	G	e
2	B♭	g	D	b
3	E♭	c	A	f♯
4	A♭	f	E	c♯
5	D♭	b♭	B	g♯
6	G♭	e♭	F♯	d♯
7	C♭	a♭	C♯	a♯
8	F♭	d♭	G♯	e♯
