= A minor =

Minor musical scale based on the note A

- Relative key: C major
- Parallel key: A major
- Dominant key: E minor
- Subdominant key: D minor

Component pitches
- A, B, C, D, E, F, G

A minor is a minor scale based on A, B, C, D, E, F, and G. Its key signature has no flats or sharps. Its relative major is C major and its parallel major is A major.

The A natural minor scale is:

Changes needed for the melodic and harmonic versions of the scale are written in with accidentals as necessary. The A harmonic minor and melodic minor scales are:

== Scale degree chords ==
The scale degree chords of A minor are:

- Tonic – A minor
- Supertonic – B diminished
- Mediant – C major
- Subdominant – D minor
- Dominant – E minor
- Submediant – F major
- Subtonic – G major

== Well-known compositions in A minor ==
- Johann Sebastian Bach
  - English Suite No. 2, BWV 807
  - Sonata No. 2 in A minor, BWV 1003
  - Partita in A minor, BWV 1013
  - Violin Concerto in A minor, BWV 1041
  - Allein zu dir, Herr Jesu Christ, BWV 33
- Ludwig van Beethoven
  - Violin Sonata No. 4, Op. 23
  - String Quartet No. 15, Op. 132
  - Bagatelle in A minor, "Für Elise"
- Johannes Brahms
  - String Quartet No, 2, Op. 51/2
  - Double Concerto, Op. 102
  - Clarinet Trio, Op. 114
- Max Bruch
  - Romance for violin and orchestra, Op. 42
  - Serenade for violin and orchestra, Op. 75
- Frédéric Chopin
  - Étude Op. 10, No. 2
  - Étude Op. 25, No. 4
  - Étude Op. 25, No. 11, Winter Wind
  - Mazurka Op. 17, No. 4
  - Mazurka Op. 59, No. 1
  - Boléro, Op. 19
  - Prelude No. 2 in A minor, Op. 28/2
  - Waltz in A minor, B. 150
- Antonín Dvořák
  - String Quintet No. 1, Op. 1
  - String Quartet No. 6, Op. 12
  - String Quartet No. 7, Op. 16
  - Violin Concerto, Op. 53
- Alexander Glazunov
  - Violin concerto, Op. 82
- Edvard Grieg
  - Piano Concerto, Op. 16
  - Cello Sonata, Op. 36
- Johann Nepomuk Hummel
  - Piano Concerto No. 2, Op. 85
- Franz Liszt
  - Transcendental Étude No. 2, Fusées
- Gustav Mahler
  - Symphony No. 6
  - Piano Quartet
- Felix Mendelssohn
  - Symphony No. 3, Scottish
- Wolfgang Amadeus Mozart
  - Piano Sonata No. 8, K. 310
  - Rondo, K. 511
- Niccolò Paganini
  - Caprice No. 24
- Sergei Rachmaninoff
  - Isle of the Dead, Op. 29
  - Rhapsody on a Theme of Paganini, Op. 43
  - Symphony no. 3, Op. 44
- Maurice Ravel
  - Piano Trio
  - Sonata for Violin and Cello
- Camille Saint-Saëns
  - Introduction and Rondo Capriccioso, Op. 28
  - Cello Concerto No. 1, Op. 33
- Franz Schubert
  - Piano Sonata, D 537
  - Piano Sonata, D 784
  - String Quartet No. 13, D 804 Rosamunde
  - Piano Sonata, D 845
  - Arpeggione Sonata, D. 821
- Clara Schumann
  - Piano Concerto, Op. 7
- Robert Schumann
  - Three Romances for Oboe and Piano, Op. 94
  - Violin Sonata No. 1, Op. 105
  - Piano Concerto, Op. 54
  - Cello Concerto, Op. 129
- Jean Sibelius
  - Symphony No. 4, Op. 63
- Dmitri Shostakovich
  - Violin Concerto No. 1, Op. 99
- Georg Philipp Telemann
  - Fantasia for Solo Flute No. 2
  - Fantasia for Solo Violin No. 12
- Ralph Vaughan Williams
  - Oboe Concerto
- Antonio Vivaldi
  - Concerto for violin, Op. 3/6 RV 356
  - Concerto for two violins, Op. 3/8 RV 522
  - Concerto for violin, Op. 4/4 RV 357
  - Concerto for violin, Op. 7/4 RV 354
  - Concerto for violin, Op. 9/5 RV 358

No.	Flats		Sharps	
No.	Major	minor	Major	minor
0	C	a	C	a
1	F	d	G	e
2	B♭	g	D	b
3	E♭	c	A	f♯
4	A♭	f	E	c♯
5	D♭	b♭	B	g♯
6	G♭	e♭	F♯	d♯
7	C♭	a♭	C♯	a♯
8	F♭	d♭	G♯	e♯
