= Schloss Ledenburg =

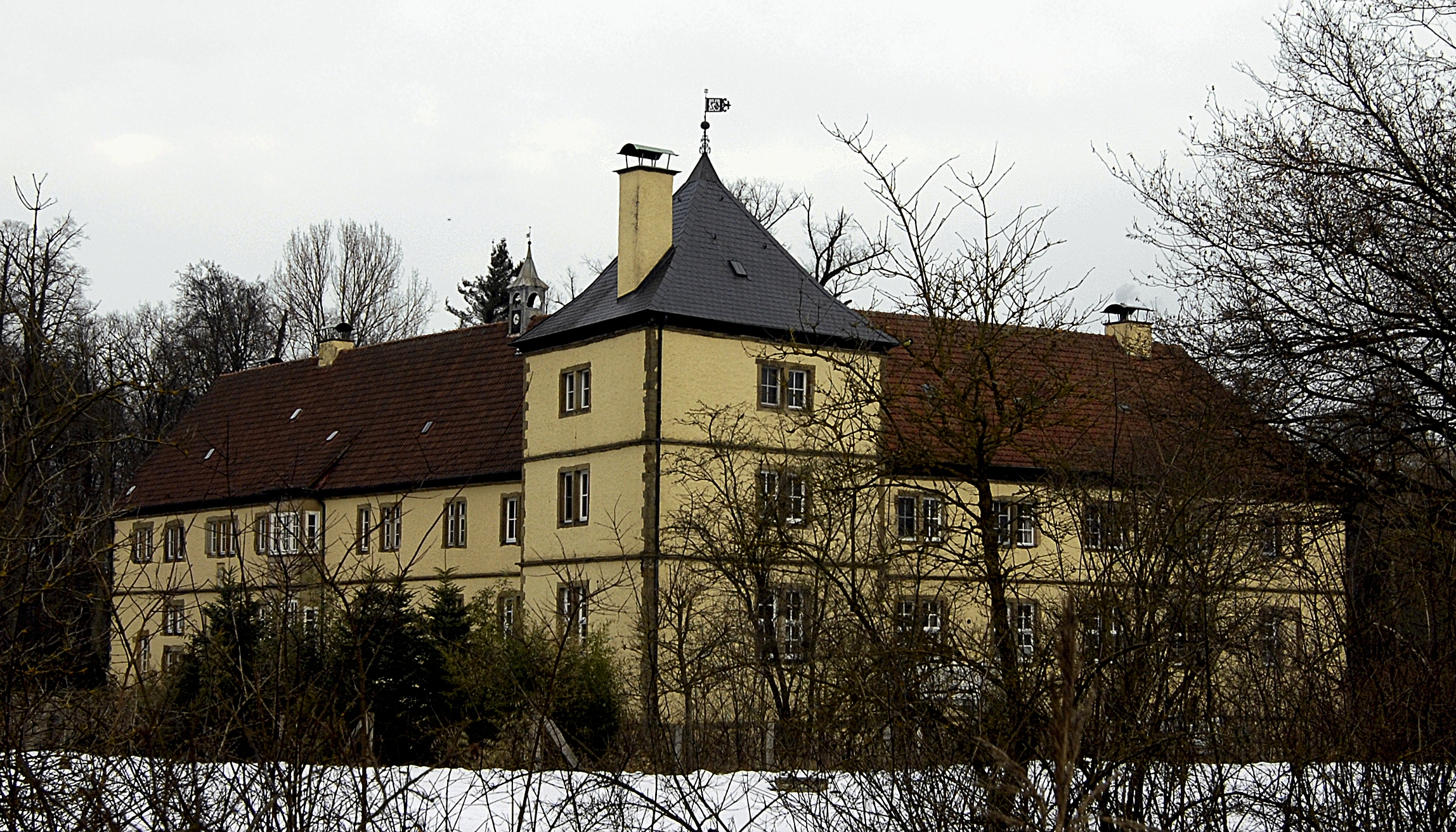
- Main building, from the south-west
- Interactive map of the Schloss Ledenburg area

General information
- Type: Moated Schloss
- Location: Bissendorf, Germany
- Coordinates: 52.2345°N 8.2426°E
- Completed: 15th century
- Renovated: 1627

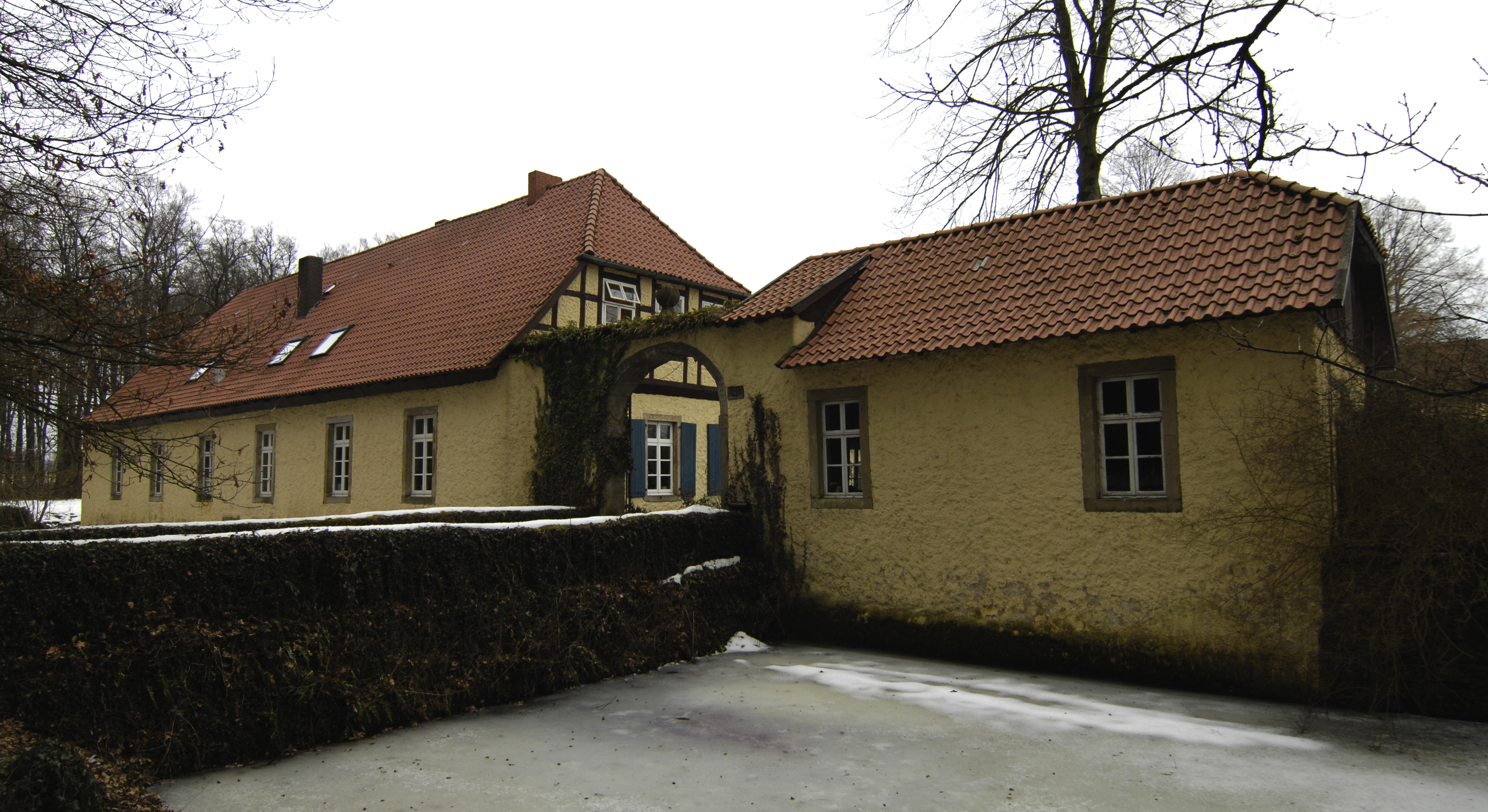
Gate house

Schloss Ledenburg (Ledenburg manor) is a moated Schloss in Bissendorf-Nemden, Osnabrück district, Lower Saxony, Germany, which probably dates from the 15th century. Originally built with four wings, it was reduced to two wings during restoration after a fire in 1618. It belonged to many noble families. It housed what is called now the Ledenburg Collection, an 18th-century collection of poems by Eleonore von Grothaus and a music collection, where music by Georg Philipp Telemann, Carl Friedrich Abel and others was rediscovered in 2015 and subsequently published.

== History ==
The castle Holter Burg of the Holten family on the site of the current palace was destroyed in 1147. It was probably rebuilt in the 15th century as a moated building with four wings, first called Neue Burg Holte (New Holte castle). When the Leden family, who also had a mansion in Osnabrück, used it as a residence, it was called Schloss Ledenburg.

The building was severely damaged by a fire in 1618. Restoration was completed in 1627, now with only two wings. When the Leden family died out, it went in 1557 to the Enningloh family, also known as Pladiese. From 1622 to 1776 it was owned by the family Grothaus zu Krietenstein, then by the counts of Münster. The palace has belonged to the Homann family in Dissen from 1951.

The buildings are a main building ("Haupthaus") with two wings and an adjacent tower, and a separate gate house. The only exterior decorations are a sandstone bay window and the entrance with pilasters. The interior of the west wing has an imperial staircase ("dreiläufiges Treppenhaus"), an early example in northern Germany of the then new design, which followed on from the spiral stairs of the Weserrenaissance. The building houses a fireplace decorated with stone figures, and several ceramic stoves. It is a registered monument.

The Ledenburg Collection (Ledenburg-Sammlung) is the name of a collection of historic documents which was deposited at the Niedersächsisches Landesarchiv (state archive of Lower Saxony) in Osnabrück in 2000. They date back to Eleonore von Grothaus, who was a poet and a musician, married to Georg Hermann Heinrich von Münster in 1759. The collection contains handwritten poems and music in prints and copies, with a focus on music for viola da gamba by German and Italian composers. Thanks to research by the French musicologist François-Pierre Goy, the collection was discovered and researched by musicologists, resulting in new editions of music that were assumed to have been lost, especially Telemann's Twelve Fantasias for Viola da Gamba solo, but also three sonatas and a trios by Carl Friedrich Abel.

Edition Güntersberg published most of the collection, including three sonatas by Giacobo Cervetto (1681/1682–1783), two sonatas by Giuseppe Tartini, a sonata by Juan Bautista Pla, two anonymous sonatas, a sonata by Filippo Ruge (1722 – after 1767), a sonata by Pietro Castrucci, a trio by Friedrich Schwindl, and a trio by Johann Konrad Gretsch (ca. 1710 – 1778).

The building is surrounded by an estate with 200 hectares of forest, of which 30 hectares were damaged by cyclone Kyrill in 2007.
