= Holter Burg =

Castle in Bissendorf, Germany

- Bissendorf
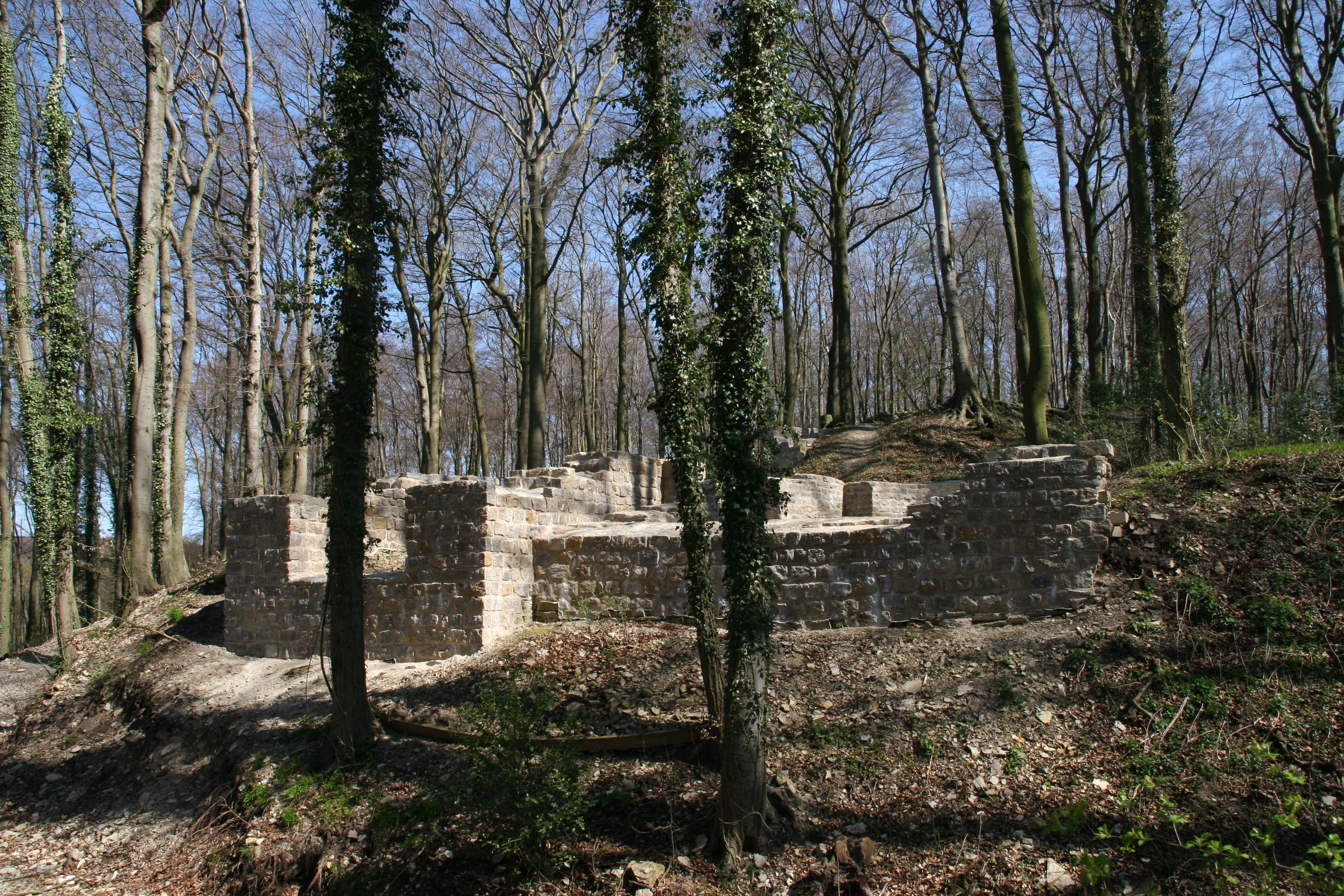
- Reconstructed walls on the original foundations of the castle

Site information
- Type: hill castle
- Code: DE-NI
- Condition: wall remnants, ramparts

Location
- Coordinates: 52°12′53″N 8°11′12″E
- Height: 184 m above sea level (NN)

Site history
- Built: in the 10th and 11th centuries

Garrison information
- Occupants: lesser nobility

The Holter Burg is the oldest castle site in the municipality of Bissendorf near Osnabrück in the German state of Lower Saxony. It is the ruin of a hill castle. It was the third hill castle in Osnabrück Land along with the Iburg and the Wittekindsburg near Rulle.

== History ==
The Holter Burg was the family seat of the lords of Holte. Their most important representatives were Wigbold of Holte, Archbishop of Cologne and Arch-Chancellor of the Empire, the Essen prince-abbess, Beatrice of Holte, and the bishops of Münster, Burchard of Holte, William I of Holte and Ludolf of Holte. The castle was probably initially destroyed as early as 1147 by the Bishop of Osnabrück, Philip of Katzenelnbogen (1141 to 1173), and the counts of Ravensberg in a feud with the lords of Holte. It may have been destroyed for the last time between 1308 and 1315, although the latest archaeological investigations suggest an earlier date, because a fire layer found in the ground dates the mid-13th century. Schloss Ledenburg in the municipality of Nemden (part of Bissendorf) was built as the "New" Holter Burg.

== Description ==
The Holter Burg was initially built as a tower castle on a plateau with a diameter of around 50 metres located on a rocky hill spur. It was guarded by a section of moat with a roughly 20-metre-wide and up to 10-metre-deep ditch. A roughly 2-metre-thick enceinte protected the castle. In the east the height difference between the top of the wall and the bed of the moat was around 16 metres. In the west there was no moat due to the steep hillside. The castle's first building stage, probably around 1100, consisted of the mighty round tower and the enceinte. Later, a castle chapel and palas were added.

Today only wall remains may be seen along with the plan of a round tower. The deep moats may also be made out. Within the double ditch system, the site has an area of about 5,000 square metres. In 1997 and 2006 there were archaeological excavations and safety measures in order to preserve the castle and make it attractive for visitors.

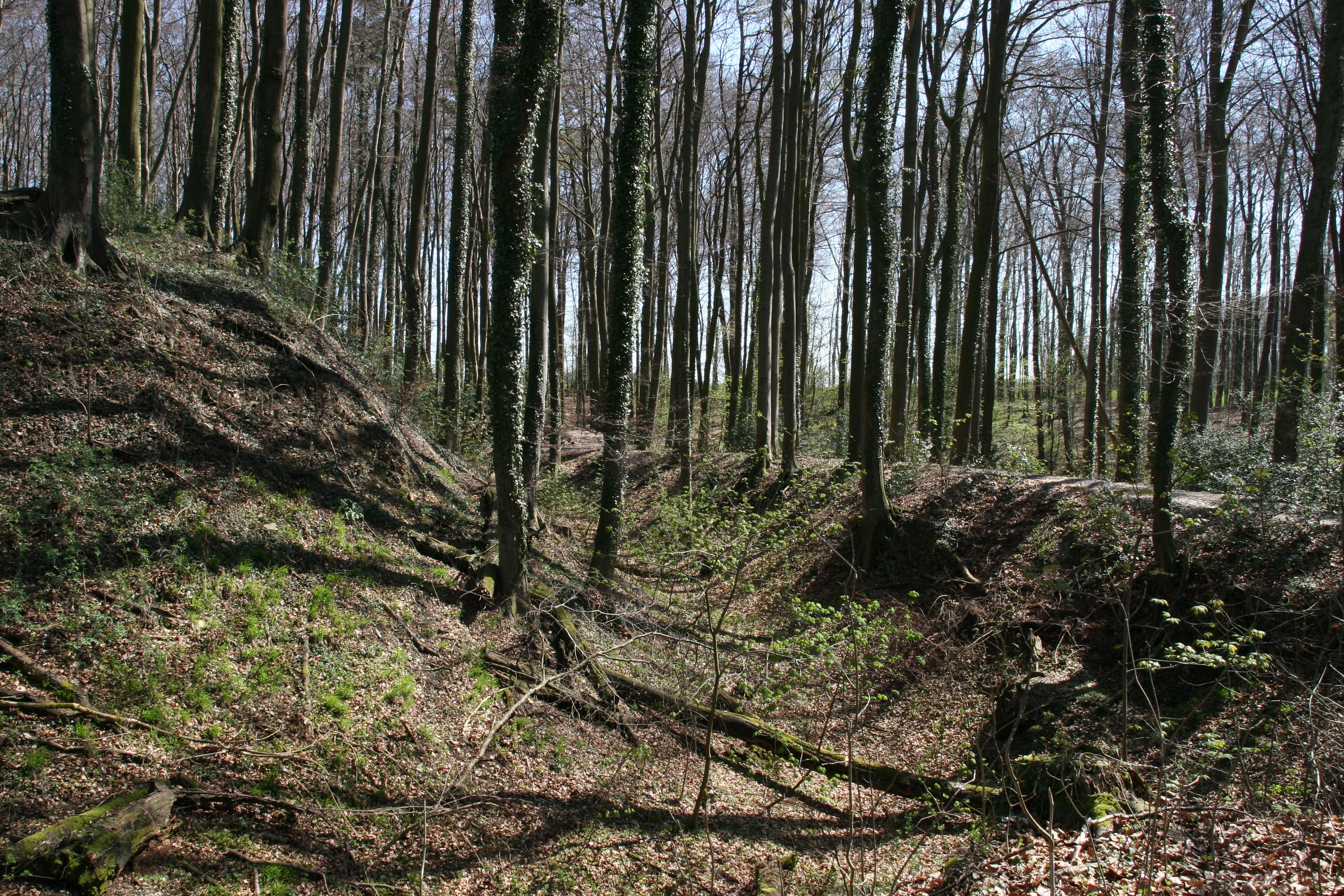
Ditch and bank system

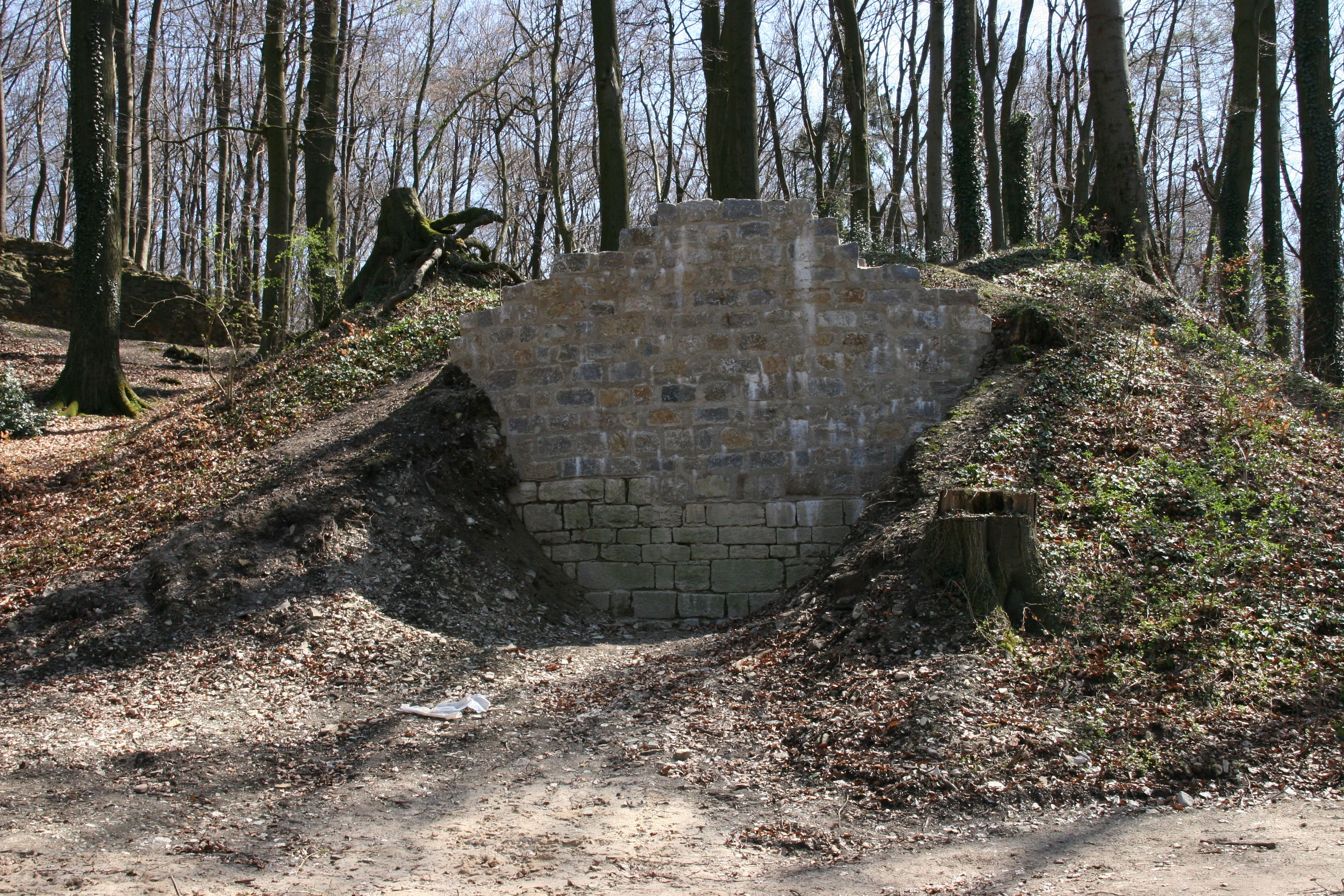
Remains of the bergfried and walls

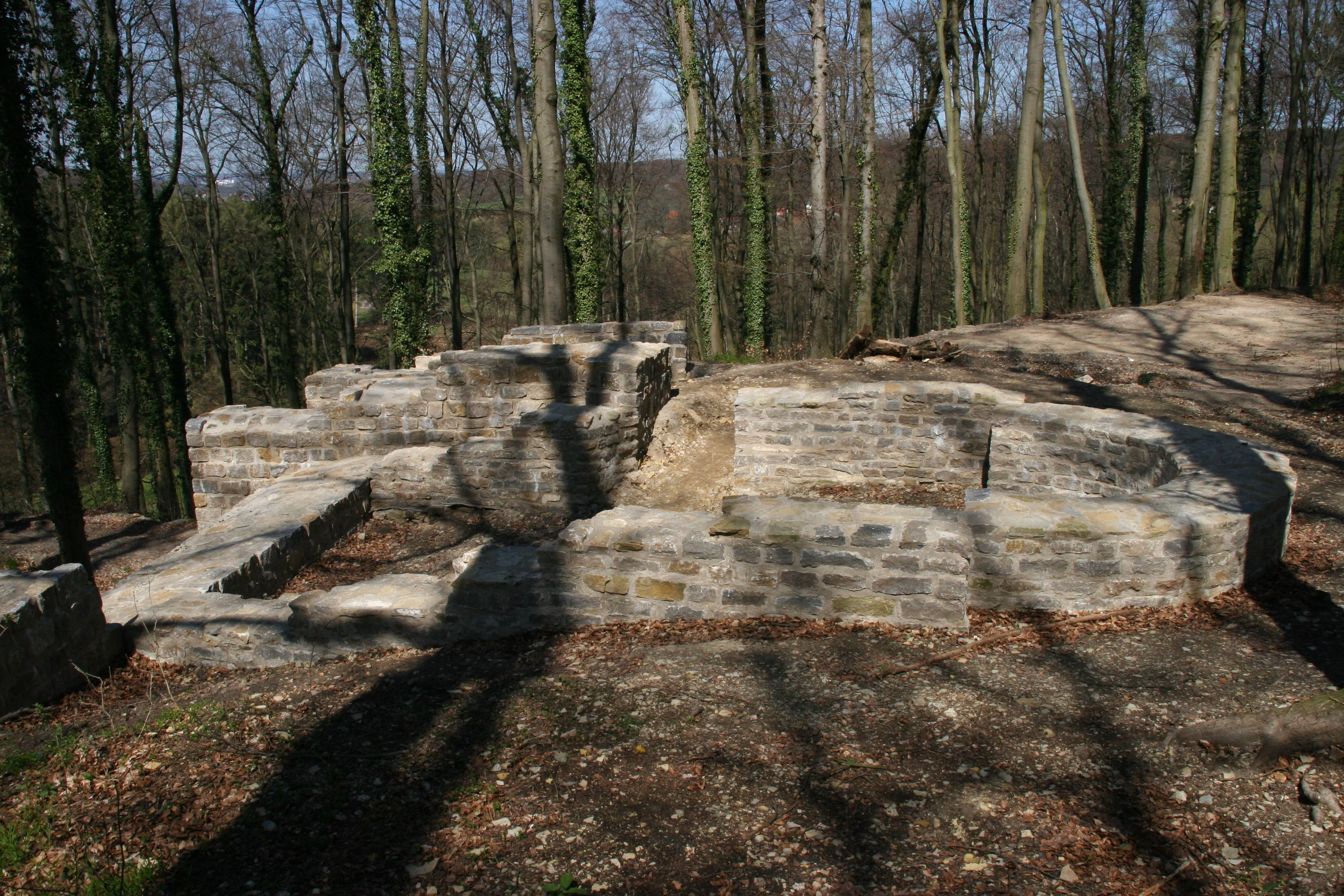
Reconstructed foundations of the chapel and chamber gate

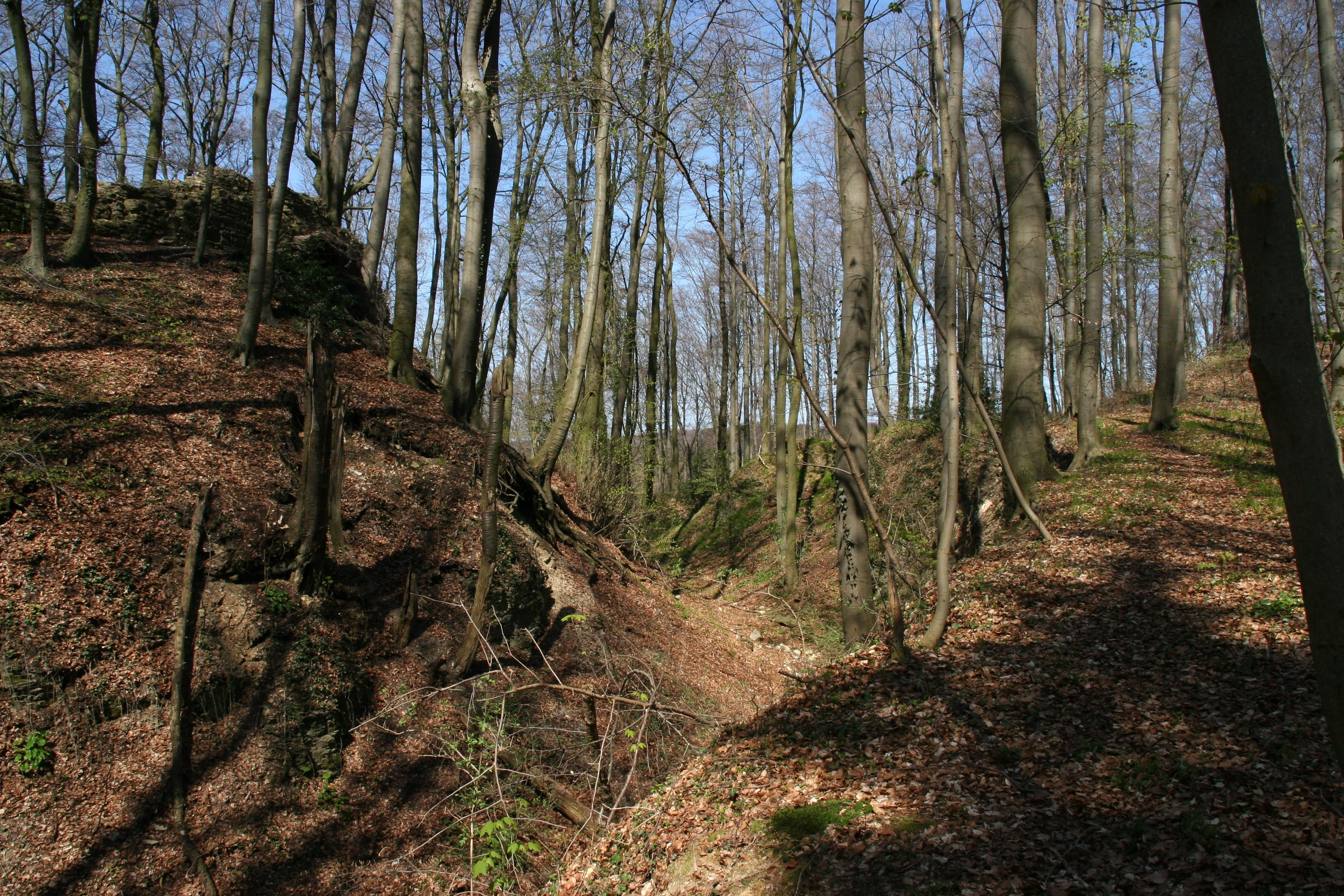
Old wall remains and ditch and bank system

== Literature ==
- Bodo Zehm, Jan-Eggerik Delbanco, Andreas Lechtape: Holte und die Holter Burg. Große Kunstführer / Schlösser und Burgen Band 266. Verlag Schnell und Steiner, Regensburg, 2011, ISBN 978-3-7954-2381-0
- Hans-Günter Peters: Archäologische Denkmäler und Funde im Landkreis Osnabrück, Verlag August Lax, Hildesheim, 1973
- Römisch-Germanisches Zentralmuseum Mainz (publ.): Führer zu vor- und frühgeschichtlichen Denkmälern - Das Osnabrücker Land III, Vol. 44, Verlag Philipp von Zabern, Mainz, 1979, ISBN 3-8053-0313-0
- Edgar F. Warnecke: Das große Buch der Burgen und Schlösser im Land von Hase und Ems. 2. erw. Auflage, Verlag Wenner, Osnabruck, 1985, ISBN 3-87898-297-6
- Wolfgang Schlüter: Burgen und Befestigungen. Schriften zur Archäologie des Osnabrücker Landes, Vol. II. Bramsche, 2000, ISBN 3-934005-97-7
- Ernst Andreas Friedrich: Die Ruine der Burg Holte, pp. 105–107, in: Wenn Steine reden könnten, Band III, Landbuch-Verlag, Hanover, 1995, ISBN 3-7842-0515-1.
- Wolfgang Schlüter: Die Burg Holte in Holte-Sünsbeck, Gemeinde Bissendorf, Ldkr. Osnabrück In: Mamoun Fansa, Frank Both, Henning Haßmann (eds.): Archäologie|Land|Niedersachsen. 400.000 Jahre Geschichte. Landesmuseum für Natur und Mensch, Oldenburg, 2004. Pages 574–577.
- Jan-Eggerik Delbanco: Erwacht aus dem Dornröschenschlaf in: Archäologie in Niedersachsen, pp. 71–75, 2013
- Deutsche Bundesstiftung Umwelt (publ.): Archäologie und Forstwirtschaft im Einklang. Denkmalschutz und Präsentation von Burgen in Waldgebieten. (online, pdf)
