= Eleonore von Grothaus =

German noblewoman, writer, poet and lay musician

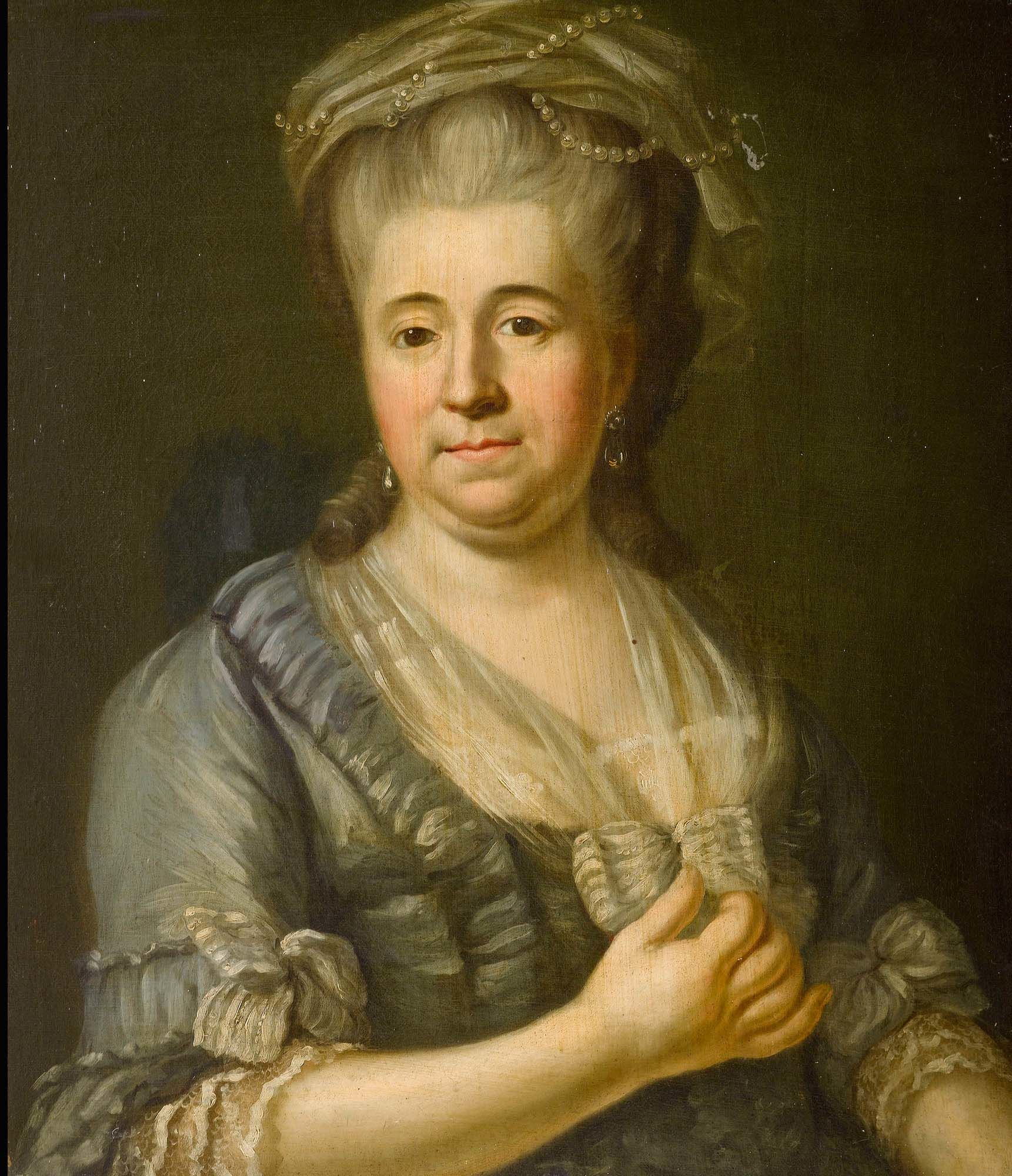
- Portrait of Eleonore Freiin von Münster zur Surenburg, née von Grothaus zur Ledenburg, c. 1770
- Born: Eleonore Elisabeth Helene Sophie von Grothaus; 10 April 1734; Schloss Ledenburg
- Died: 26 March 1794 (aged 59); Hanover
- Other name: Eleonore von Münster
- Occupations: Writer and poet
- Known for: Ledenburg Collection
- Spouse: Georg von Münster zu Surenburg
- Children: Ernst zu Münster

Eleonore von Grothaus, also Countess Eleonore von Münster (10 April 1734 – 26 March 1794), was a German noblewoman, a writer and poet, and a lay musician. She may have assembled a collection of writings and music, the Ledenburg Collection from the manor house where she was born. The collection held music by notable 18th-century composers that seemed lost until it was rediscovered in 2015.

== Life ==
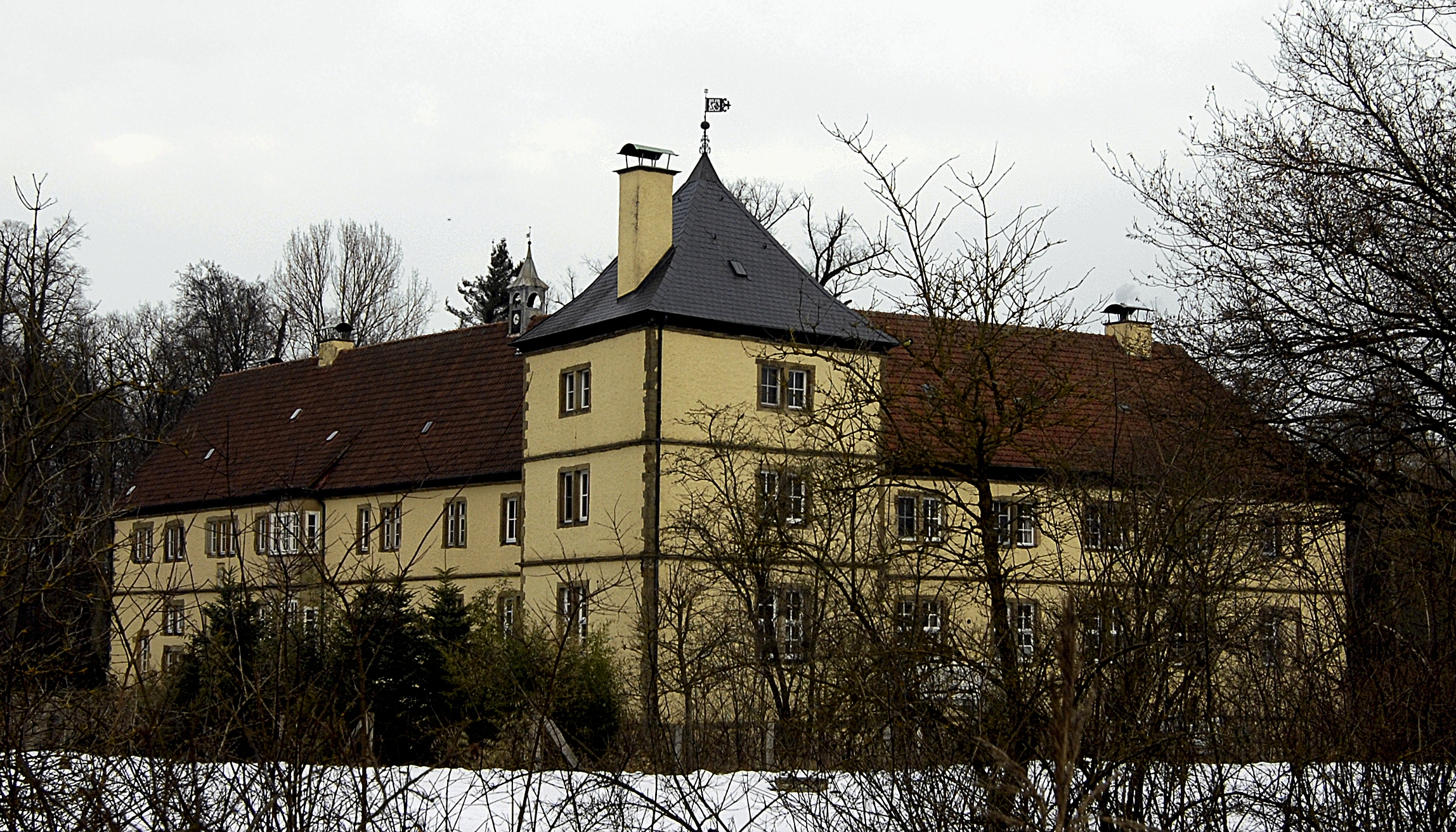
Schloss Ledenburg, castle where she was born and lived

Born in Schloss Ledenburg, Lower Saxony, Eleonore Elisabeth Helene Sophie von Grothaus was the eldest daughter of the general Ernst Philipp von Grothaus (1703-1776), who served Hanover and the Kingdom of Great Britain, and his wife Anna Friederike von Oldershausen (1715-1773), who inherited considerable properties. She grew up in Castle Ledenburg which was owned by her family since 1622. She wrote poems, and was interested in art and the sciences. Walter Schwarze, who published her biography in 1928, wrote:

"Among the rhetorical arts ... music took the first place, and much handwritten music for piano, viola d'amour, (Note: Schwarze probably meant: viola da gamba, not viola d'amore) flute and voice was in her repertoire, which was crowned by Handel and Telemann. The newest arias could be heard, and Eleonore wrote many a poem in this format or following existing melodies, and she expressed the impact of the music when she narrated how Orpheus sang ..."

In 1759, she married Count Georg von Münster zu Surenburg (1721–1773), Hofmarschall of the Prince-Bishopric of Osnabrück. He was a widower with seven children. The couple had six more children, including a son, Count Ernst Friedrich Herbert zu Münster-Ledenburg, Freiherr von Grothaus. After her husband died in 1773, she devoted her time mostly to raising the children. In 1783, she was appointed by Charles William Ferdinand, Duke of Brunswick-Wolfenbüttel to educate his daughter Caroline, then age 14, the future wife of George IV. It was a difficult task, as she noted in her diaries. She returned to Osnabrück in 1791 for a short time, and moved then to Hanover where she died. She is buried on the Gartenfriedhof.

== Work ==
Von Grothaus wrote around sixty poems, three stories and three stage works. She exchanged letters, for example with Justus Möser. She left two booklets with prose stories, two with diary entries from 1789 to 1790, and some poetry and prose in French. She published several of her literary works under her married name, Eleonore von Münster.

She may have been the collector of music, especially for the viola da gamba, which belonged to Schloss Ledenburg and is now in the State Archive of Lower Saxony, where it was studied from 2015, called the Ledenburg Collection, and mostly published by Edition Güntersberg.
