= Edition Güntersberg =

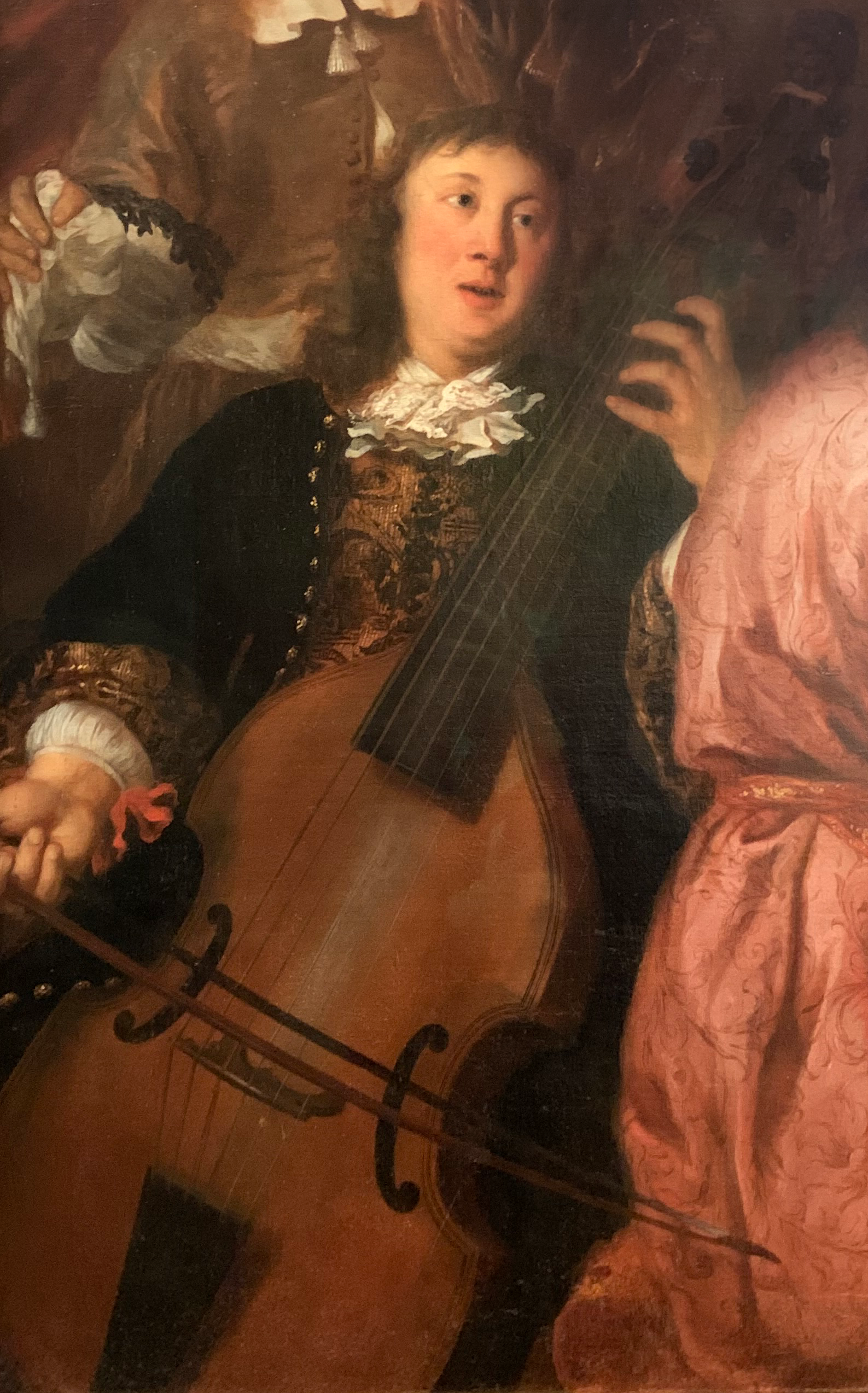
- Dieterich Buxtehude playing the viola da gamba, a key instrument for the publisher
- Founded: 1990
- Founder: Günter von Zadow; Leonore von Zadow-Reichling
- Country of origin: Germany
- Headquarters location: Heidelberg
- Publication types: sheet music
- Official website: www.guentersberg.de/index-en.php

Edition Güntersberg is a German publishing house of classical music, focused on compositions for the viola da gamba. It was founded in Heidelberg in 1990 by Günter von Zadow and Leonore von Zadow-Reichling, who is a professional gambist. In addition to works from Renaissance and Baroque, the company has published music from the early classical period, for both viola da gamba, for example by Carl Friedrich Abel, and baryton, including works by Joseph Haydn.

== Publishing history ==
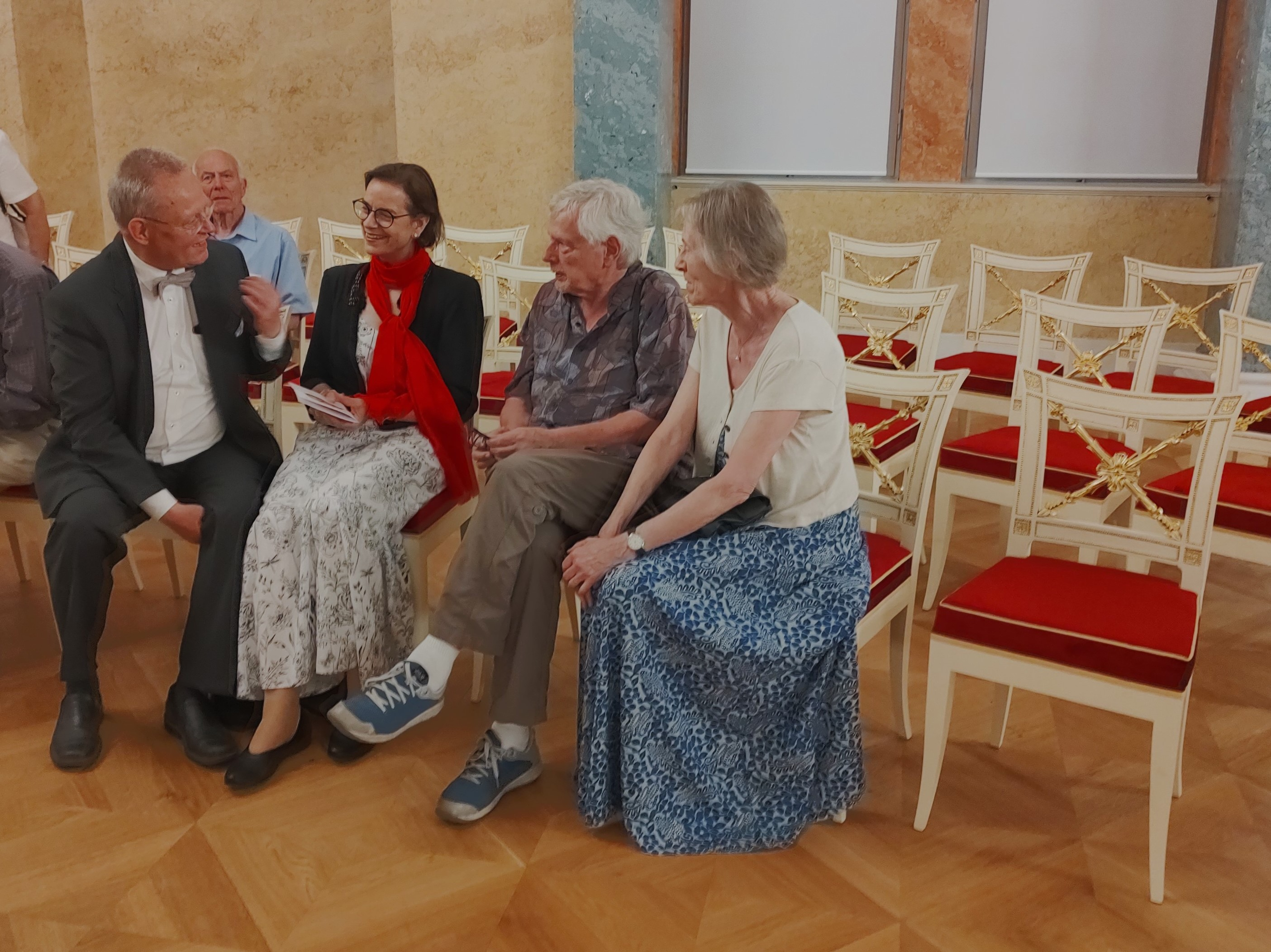
Leonore von Zadow-Reichling and Günter von Zadow (r.) at the opening concert of the Abel Fest at Schloss Köthen

In 2007 they published several works by Dieterich Buxtehude, including Mit Fried und Freud, one of the few works printed during the composer's lifetime. A copy is held by the Badische Landesbibliothek, shown in facsimile along with the new edition. A review of their edition of a duo sonata for violin and viola da gamba by Buxtehde noted the detailed preface, relevant for historically informed performance, and a facsimile of the original, also the setting in modern style faithful to the composer's accidentals, and without added dynamic marking. Players find both a score with figured bass, and a keyboard part with a suggestion. They published the many string trios for baryton, viola and cello by Joseph Haydn, for example numbers 97 to 126 in 2009. In 2010 they published Alexander Ferdinand Grychtolik's reconstruction of Bach's lost homage cantata O angenehme Melodei, based on a wedding cantata.

In 2016 they published Telemann's Twelve Fantasias for Viola da Gamba solo (Twelve Fantasies pour la Basse de Violle) which had been thought to be lost. Based on research of a French musicologist, they were found in an archive and first performed by the gambist Thomas Fritzsch, who is also a musicologist teaching at the Leipzig University. The archive held a complete copy of the music, which Telemann had printed in 1735 in his own publishing house, in a private collection held at the Niedersächsisches Landesarchiv (state archive of Lower Saxony) in Osnabrück The Collection came from Schloss Ledenburg and is now called Ledenburg Collection. Fritzsch played the fantasias for the first time after their rediscovery in two concerts as part of the 23rd Magdeburger Telemann-Festtage on 19 and 20 March 2016, along with a recording (made at the abbey church of Zscheiplitz) and the presentation of the edition. The same collection held also three sonatas by Carl Friedrich Abel, published in 2016, Other publications from the collection include three sonatas by Giacobo Cervetto, two sonatas by Giuseppe Tartini, a sonata by Juan Bautista Pla, two anonymous sonatas, a sonata by Filippo Ruge (1722 – after 1767), a sonata by Pietro Castrucci, a trio by Friedrich Schwindl, a trio by Johann Konrad Gretsch (ca. 1710 – 1778) and a trio attributed to Abel.

=== Abel Fest 2023 ===
Günter von Zadow wrote in five years an extended new works list of Abel's compositions, Catalogue of Works of Carl Friedrich Abel, or AbelWV. It takes into account many newly discovered works, and additional sources for known works, presenting historic background of 416 works. It was published by Ortus Musikverlag in 2023, the year of the composer's tricentenary.

At the Abel Fest, an international festival in the composer's birth town Köthen in June 2023, Leonore von Zadow-Reichling and Günter von Zadow received the first biennial Abel Prize for their efforts to retrieve and publish Abel's works, having published more than 150 of the composer's works, many of them as first publications.
