= Thomas Fritzsch =

German viol player and musicologist

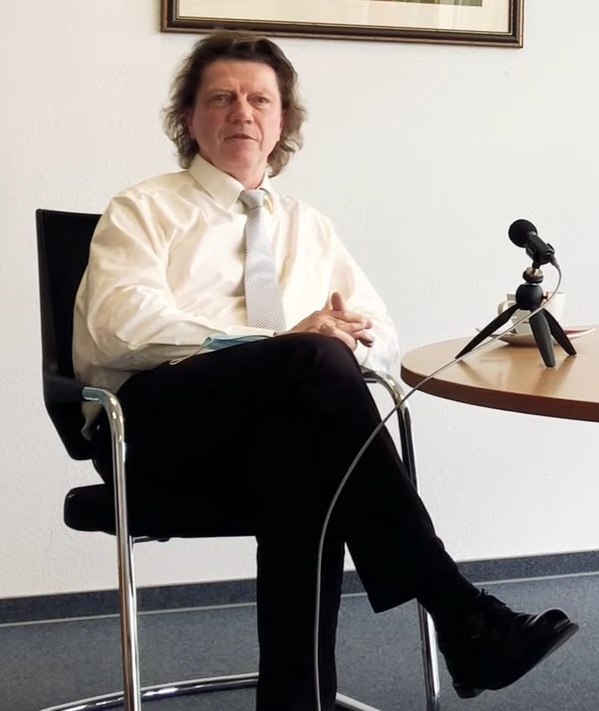
- Fritzsch in 2021
- Born: 1961 (age 64–65); Zwickau, East Germany
- Education: Musikhochschule Leipzig
- Occupations: Cellist; Viol player; Musicologist
- Awards: Echo Klassik

Thomas Fritzsch (born 1961) is a German viol player and musicologist who has appeared internationally. He has been instrumental in reviving rediscovered music, such as Telemann's 12 Fantasias for Viola da Gamba and works by Carl Friedrich Abel, playing them in concerts and first recordings, and publishing them by Edition Güntersberg. He initiated a music festival in Köthen, Abel's hometown, on the occasion of the composer's tercentenary in 2023.

== Life and career ==
Fritzsch was born and raised in Zwickau. He received his first cello lessons at the Robert Schumann Conservatory there and then studied cello and viol at the Musikhochschule Leipzig. After posts as cellist in several orchestras he decided to focus on music from the 17th and 18th centuries, in researching as well as playing. He explored and played historic cellos, such as Baroque cello, violoncello piccolo and basse de violon. He also searched for lost music, and played chamber music from the early Romantic period on historic instruments.

Fritzsch played as a soloist with Riccardo Chailly, the Gewandhausorchester and the Thomanerchor. He toured in Europe, and beyond to New York City, Boston, Tokyo, Seoul, Abu Dhabi, Dubai, Havanna, Hong Kong, Shanghai and Jerusalem. He has taught at universities in Germany and abroad, and published musicological works.

He opened the Telemann-Museum in Hamburg with a concert on 7 May 2011. The city of Köthen named him a cultural ambassador in 2014 for his international engagement for the music of Johann Sebastian Bach who had worked in the town, and of Carl Friedrich Abel who was born there.

Fritzsch was instrumental in the rediscovery of lost compositions, such as Abel's 2nd Pembroke Collection, his Viol Concerto in A major and Ledenburg-Sonaten, sonatas by Johann Christian Bach, and Telemann's 12 Fantasias for Viola da Gamba. He played the works in concerts and first recordings. The recording of Telemann's Fantasias earned him an Echo Klassik award in 2017. In 2019 he rediscovered Abel's Six Trios, Opus 3, for two violins, harpsichord and cello. The works were published by Edition Güntersberg in Heidelberg.

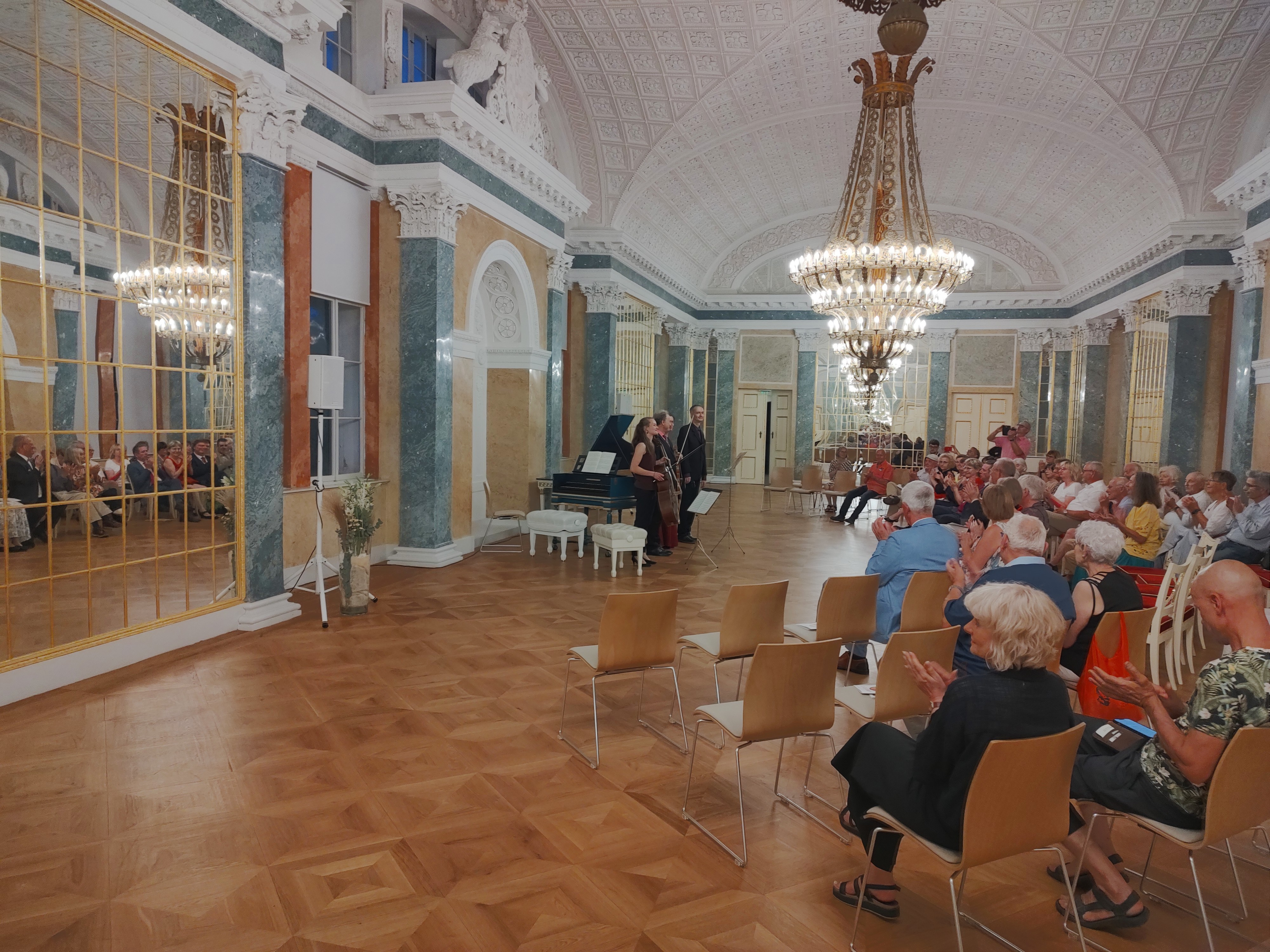
Opening concert of Abel Fest at Schloss Köthen

In 2023, Fritzsch initiated and directed an international festival around Abel's music in the composer's home town Köthen, in memory of the tercentenary of his birth.

Fritzsch and his family live in Freyburg (Unstrut).

== Recordings ==
Fritzsch made many first recordings, and a reviewer credited him with "technical brilliance" and "engaging interpretation" in "gestural, sometimes playful, sometimes theatrical performances".

- Johann Christian Bach: Viol Sonatas, Coviello, DDD, 2011.
- Telemann: Telemannisches Gesangbuch (with Klaus Mertens), Carus, DDD, 2012.
- Abel: Viol Sonatas (from the 2nd Pembroke Collection), Coviello, DDD, 2014.
- Abel: Viol Sonatas and Trios (from the Ledenburg Collection), Coviello, DDD, 2015.
- Telemann: 12 Fantaisies pour la Basse de Violle (Hamburg 1735), Coviello, DDD, 2015.
- Telemann: Telemannische Hauspostille (with Mertens), Rondeau, DDD, 2016.
- J. Chr. Bach: Quartets, Op. 8, Nos. 1–6 for oboe, violin, viol, cello (fo Carl Friedrich Abel), Coviello, DDD, 2016.
- Best of Klassik 2017 – Die Echo Klassik Preisträger, Warner, DDD, 2017.
- The 19th Century Viol

== Publication ==
- Conrad Höffler – Cammer-Musicus und Violdigambist am Hofe von Herzog Johann Adolph I. von Sachsen-Weißenfels. In: viola da gamba, 83, Dezember 2011, pp. 8–13.
