= Catalogue of Works of Carl Friedrich Abel =

Classical music catalogue

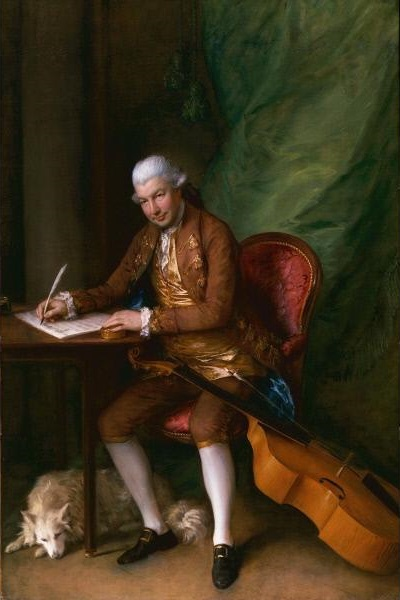
- Portrait of Abel, 1777
- Author: Günter von Zadow
- Language: English
- Genre: Music catalogue
- Published: 2023
- Publisher: Ortus Musikverlag
- Pages: 470
- ISBN: 978-3-93-778876-0

The Catalogue of Works of Carl Friedrich Abel is a catalogue of the compositions by Carl Friedrich Abel by their new work numbers, prefixed by the abbreviation AbelWV. Compiled by Günter von Zadow, it was published by Ortus Musikverlag in 2023, listing 420 compositions. It replaced a 1971 catalogue by Walter Knape with only 233 works. The new catalogue was adopted by Répertoire International des Sources Musicales (RISM).

== History ==
Carl Friedrich Abel was a composer between the Baroque era and the Classical period, trained in Leipzig, possibly by Johann Sebastian Bach. Abel was a friend and collaborator of Bach's son Johann Christian Bach, with whom he founded a subscription concert series. Abel was a renowned player of the viola da gamba, and produced significant compositions for the instrument. He had many of his works published during his lifetime.

Edition Güntersberg published more than 150 of the composer's works, many of them as first publications. In 2015 new manuscripts of Abel's viola da gamba music were found in the library of the Adam Mickiewicz University in Poznań, in a collection from the Maltzahn family palace in the town of Milicz in Poland, originally brought back from London by Count Joachim Carl of Maltzan.

Over five years Günter von Zadow wrote an extended new list of Abel's compositions, for the occasion of the tercentenary of his birth in 2023. They are catalogued by AbelWV numbers, comparable to those of Bach (BWV) and Handel (HWV). The catalogue lists 420 works. It takes into account the newly discovered works, and additional sources for known compositions.

It replaced the catalogue of Abel's works published in 1971 by Walter Knape, Abel-Werkverzeichnis, with 233 work numbers.

The Répertoire International des Sources Musicales (RISM) adopted the new catalogue numbers.

=== Abel 300 ===
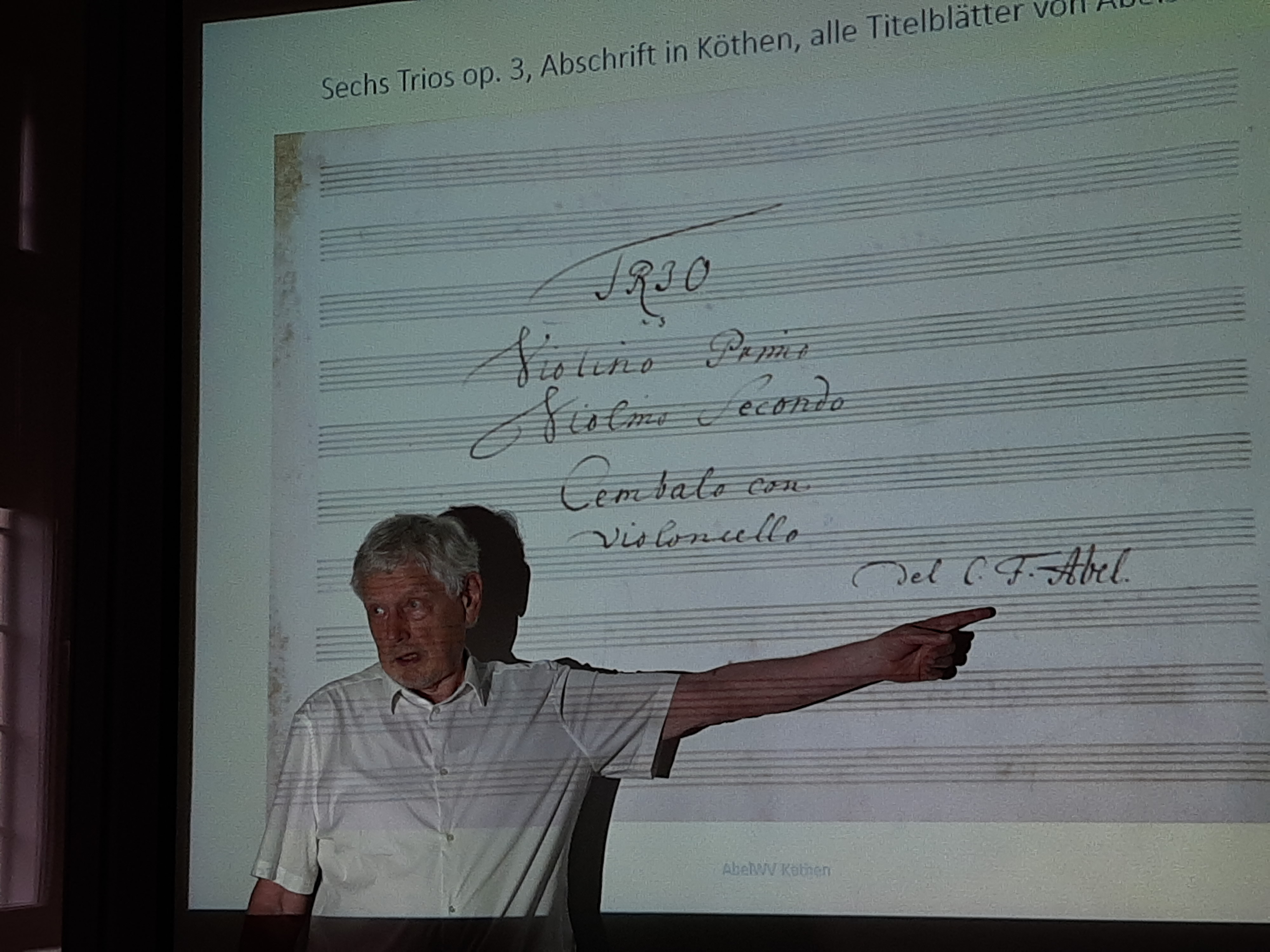
Günter von Zadow introducing the AbelWV at the Abel 300 festival in Köthen

The Catalogue was introduced at the international festival around Abel's music, Abel 300, held by the city of Köthen in June 2023 on the occasion of the tercentenary of the composer's birth. During the festival, Leonore von Zadow-Reichling and Günter von Zadow of Edition Güntersberg received the new biennial Abel Prize, for their efforts to retrieve and publish Abel's works.

== Description ==
The catalogue is arranged in groups by the number of players intended for each piece, as Abel wrote predominantly chamber music:

- Category A – One Instrument
- Category B – Two Instruments
- Category C – Three instruments
- Category D – Four instruments
- Category E – Symphonies
- Category F – Concertos
- Category G – Other works.

The numbering is open to the addition of more works, should they be found. Each category begins with an overview of the works, providing context. For each of the 420 compositions, a description with incipit, sources and concordances is provided.

The catalogue features indexes by opus number, autographs and manuscripts. It lists publishers, printed editions in RISM, and concordances to older catalogues. An index of incipits for all movements in the catalogue facilitates finding a work when the title is not known. They are grouped by key, and within a key, by beginning intervals. In an appendix, a timeline of Abel's published works is provided, with approximate dates as most editions are undated, and their dates can only be deducted from secondary sources.

One of two portraits of Abel by Thomas Gainsborough appears on the title page; other illustrations include title pages of prints.
