= Bissendorf =

- Municipality
- Coat of arms

- Location of Bissendorf within Osnabrück district
- Interactive map of Bissendorf
- Location within Germany Location within Lower Saxony
- Coordinates: 52°14′N 08°10′E
- Country: Germany
- State: Lower Saxony
- District: Osnabrück
- Subdivisions: 13

Government
  - Mayor (2021–26): Guido Halfter (Ind.)

Area
  - Total: 96.41 km^{2} (37.22 sq mi)
- Elevation: 99 m (325 ft)

Population (2025-12-31)
  - Total: 14,535
  - Density: 150.8/km^{2} (390.5/sq mi)
- Time zone: UTC+01:00 (CET)
  - Summer (DST): UTC+02:00 (CEST)
- Postal codes: 49143
- Dialling codes: 05402
- Vehicle registration: OS, BSB, MEL, WTL
- Website: www.bissendorf.de

Bissendorf (German pronunciation: [ˈbɪsn̩dɔʁf]) is a municipality in the district of Osnabrück, in Lower Saxony, Germany. It is situated approximately 9 km southeast of Osnabrück. Population 14,700 (2020).

It is divided into Bissendorf proper, Schledehausen and Wissingen.

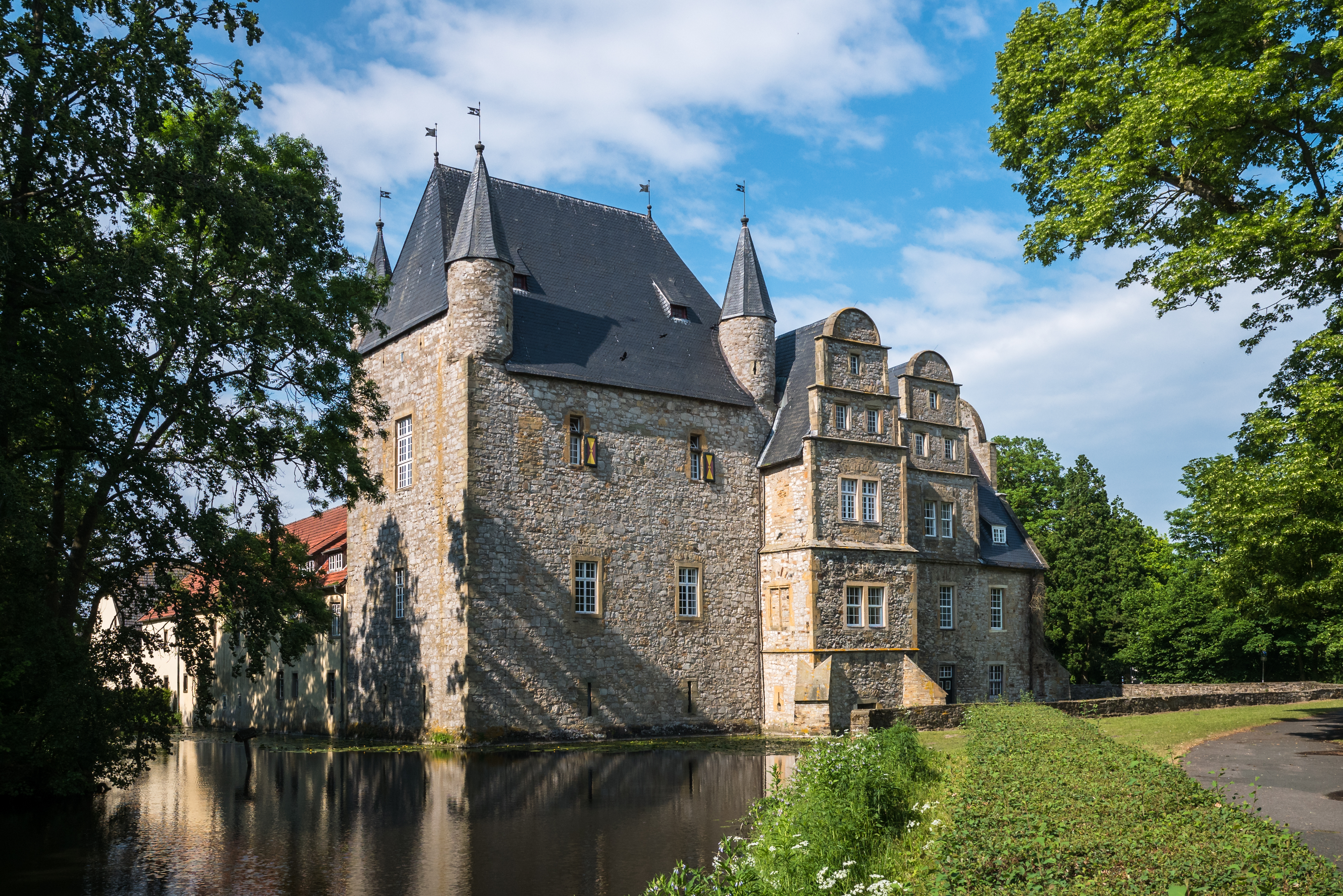
Water castle Schelenburg, Bissendorf

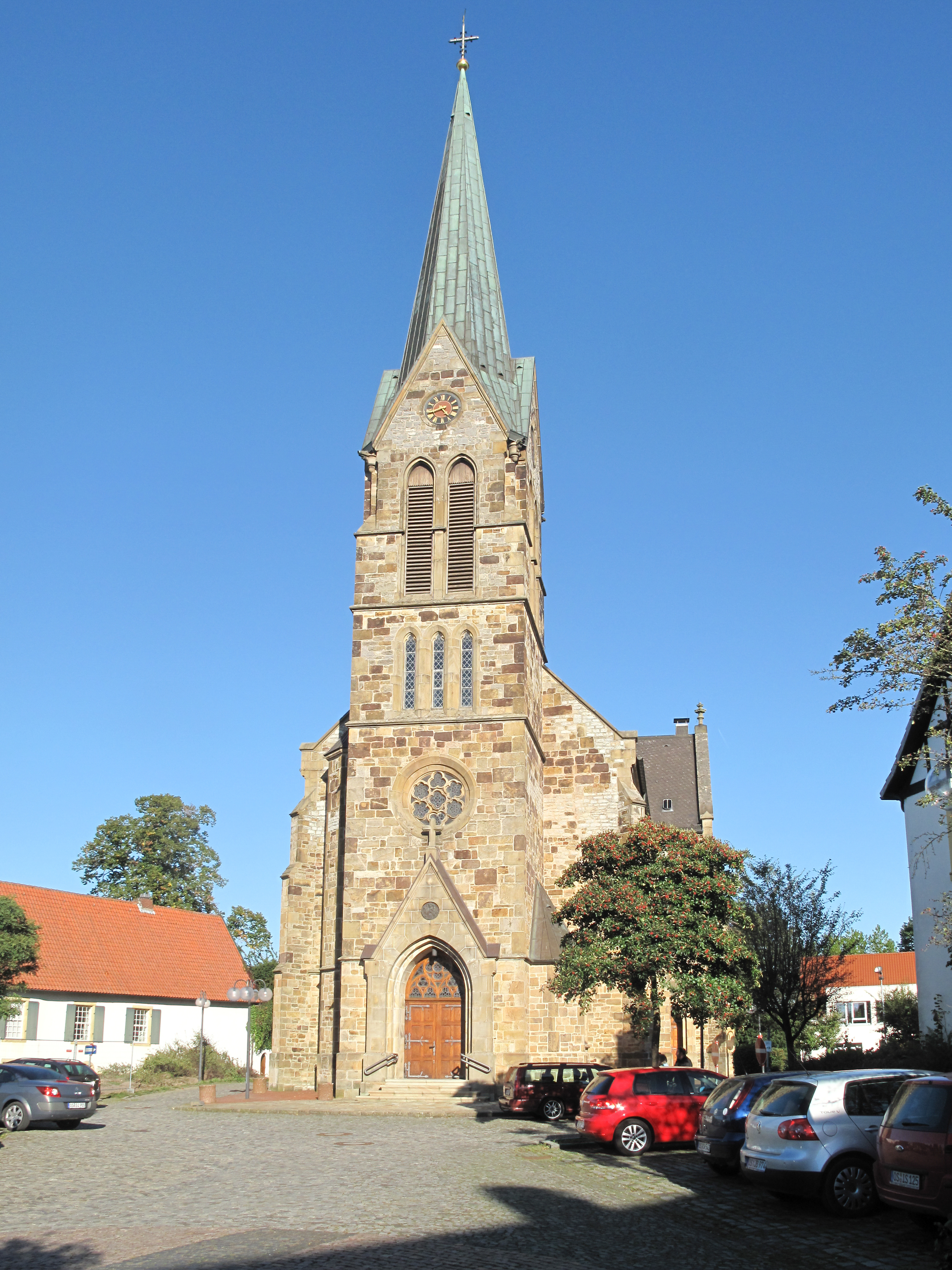
Church: St. Dionysius

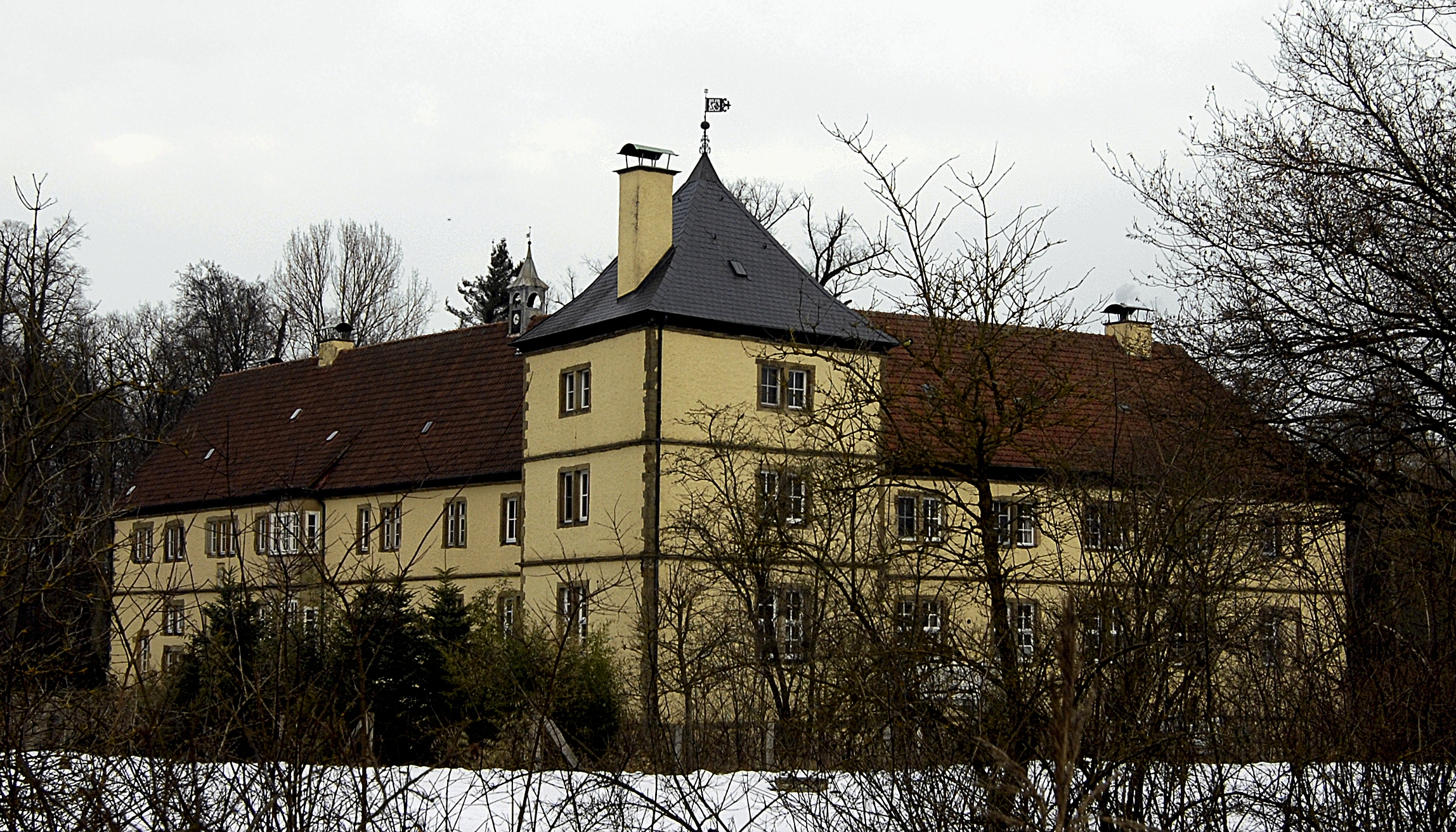
Schloss Ledenburg
