= François-Pierre Goy =

François-Pierre Goy (born 9 February 1960 in Troyes) has been a conservator at the Bibliothèque Nationale de France in Paris since 1995, first in the audiovisual section, later in the Department of Music.

== Biography ==
Holder of a diploma of Advanced Studies at Paris IV University (1993), François-Pierre Goy's research in musicology focuses on music for plucked instruments and viol, especially in the 17th century, but also on the repertoire exchange between the instruments through transcription or parody.

From 1986 to 1992, under the direction of Monique Rollin, he worked on the publication of several volumes of the Corpus des luthistes français (CNRS), then on the Sources musicales en tablature (SMT) under the direction of Christian Meyer and has published various articles and sources on his favorite field of work.

He also wrote the catalog of the early music of the region Champagne-Ardenne in the series Patrimoine musical régional.

He obtained a degree as librarian in 1995. He has also been a member of the Société Française de Luth and the Viola da Gamba Society of Great Britain.

In 2015, François-Pierre Goy identified the original manuscripts of the Twelve Fantasias for Viola da Gamba solo and in 2026 an unpublished manuscript of Wolfgang Amadeus Mozart.
