= 12 Fantasias for Viola da Gamba (Telemann) =

Twelve Fantasias for Viola da Gamba Solo Fantaisies pour la Basse de Violle
- by Georg Philipp Telemann
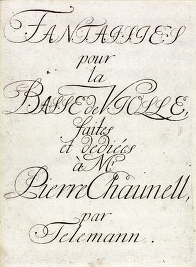
- Title page
- Catalogue: TWV 40:26–37
- Published: 1735: Hamburg

Georg Philipp Telemann's collection of Twelve Fantasias for Viola da Gamba Solo, TWV 40:26–37, was published in Hamburg in 1735, titled Fantaisies pour la Basse de Violle. The fantasias for viola da gamba were considered lost until an original print was found in a private collection in 2015. They were published by Edition Güntersberg in 2016, and first recorded and performed again by Thomas Fritzsch the same year.

== History ==
Telemann printed the fantasias for viola da gamba in 1735 in his own publishing house in Hamburg. He undertook self-publishing, offering works by subscription: His subscriber lists include buyers from Amsterdam, London and Paris. He offered a 20% discount to subscribers to the fantasias. The fantasias are among Telemann's collections of music for unaccompanied instruments, with others being twelve fantasias for solo flute (1732/33), twelve fantasias for solo violin (1735), and thirty-six pieces for harpsichord (1732–33).

Based on research by the French musicologist François-Pierre Goy, the fantasias, which had been thought to be lost, were found in 2015 in an archive of the State Archive of Lower Saxony in Osnabrück. The archive held a complete copy of the music printed by Telemann in 1735 in the private collection from Schloss Ledenburg, now called Ledenburg Collection. The fantasias were published by Edition Güntersberg in 2016, with a facsimile of Telemann's print. After their discovery, the fantasias were first performed by the gambist Thomas Fritzsch, who is also a musicologist teaching at the Leipzig University. Fritzsch played them for the first time after their rediscovery in two concerts as part of the 23rd Magdeburger Telemann-Festtage on 19 and 20 March 2016, along with a recording (made at the abbey church of Zscheiplitz) and the presentation of the edition.

== Music ==
This collection consists of the following works:

1. Fantasia in C minor (Adagio – Allegro – Adagio – Allegro)
2. Fantasia in D major (Vivace – Andante – Vivace Presto)
3. Fantasia in E minor (Largo – Presto – Vivace)
4. Fantasia in F major (Vivace – Grave – Allegro)
5. Fantasia in B♭ major (Allegro – Largo – Allegro)
6. Fantasia in G major (Scherzando – Dolce – Spirituoso)
7. Fantasia in G minor (Andante – Vivace – Allegro)
8. Fantasia in A major (Allegro – Vivace – Allegro)
9. Fantasia in C major (Presto – Grave – Allegro)
10. Fantasia in E major (Dolce – Allegro – Dolce – Allegro Siciliana Scherzando)
11. Fantasia in D minor (Allegro – Grave – Allegro)
12. Fantasia in E♭ major (Andante – Allegro – Vivace)

Written at a time when the instrument was no longer fashionable, Telemann had to compose with imagination to attract buyers. A reviewer of Gramophone notes: "Telemann presents a cornucopia of broken chords, unison and contrapuntal writing, passagework and even some plucking; there's also a nod to the fashion tussle of the time between the fugal and the galant style".

== Performances, arrangement and recordings ==
The fantasias have been performed internationally after their rediscovery, especially in 2017, celebrating 250 years after the composer died. The flutist Monika Mandelartz arranged the fantasias for her instrument, saying that they are "complex, musically rich pieces, albeit not immediately understandable to the performer".

Jonathan Dunford recorded the fantasias in two volumes, one in April 2016, the second in May that year, and he played excerpts in lectures for France Musique in July 2016. The fantasias were recorded by Robert Smith in 2017. A reviewer of The Guardian noted the compositions' "astonishing range" in character between "infectious jollity" and "depths of despair", and attest that the player "navigates each piece with clear-eyed musicality, always weaving a beautifully sonorous, coherent line through Telemann's rich invention". In a comparative review of current recordings of the Fantasias, Fanfare magazine writes that it is John Dornenburg in his 2020 recording "who is the most imaginative and who gets the most out of Telemann's music," stating that "Dornenburg's playing is more assertive and his tone is warmer, fuller, and more characterful."

== Award ==
Fritzsch was awarded the Echo Klassik 2017 in the category Welterstaufführung (World Premiere Recording) for his first recording of the fantasias.

== Edition ==
- Zadow, Günter von; Fritzsch, Thomas, eds. (2016). Telemann, Zwölf Fantasien für Viola da Gamba solo, 40:26–37, VdG, Moderne Ausgabe und Faksimile. Edition Güntersberg. ISMN 979-0-50174-281-3.

== Bibliography ==
- "Georg Philipp Telemann (1681–1767) / Twelve Fantasias for Viola da Gamba solo". Edition Güntersberg. 2016.
- Zohn, Steven (2001). "Georg Philipp Telemann". In Sadie, Stanley; Tyrrell, John (eds.). The New Grove Dictionary of Music and Musicians (2nd ed.). London: Macmillan. ISBN 978-1-56159-239-5.
- Heinrich, Susanne (2016). "Georg Philipp Telemann (1681–1767) / 12 Fantasias for Solo Viola da Gamba / Edition Güntersberg, G281 (2016), Ledenburg Sammlung, with Facsimile" (PDF). The Viola da Gamba Society Journal. 10: 43–80.
- Zadow, Günter von (2016). "The Works for Viola da Gamba in the Ledenburg Collection" (PDF). The Viola da Gamba Society Journal. 10: 43–80.
- Zohn, Steven (2008). Music for a Mixed Taste: Style, Genre, and Meaning in Telemann's Instrumental Works. Oxford University Press. ISBN 978-0-19-516977-5.
