= Carl Friedrich Abel =

German composer (1723–1787)

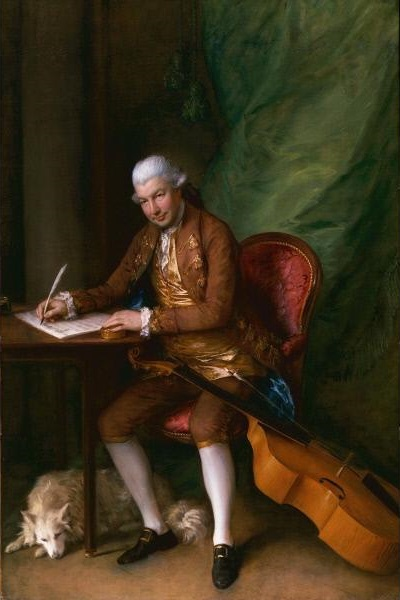
- 1777 portrait by Thomas Gainsborough
- Born: Köthen, Anhalt-Köthen, Holy Roman Empire
- Baptized: 22 December 1723
- Died: 20 June 1787 (aged 63); London, England
- Occupations: Gambist; Composer
- Parent: Christian Ferdinand Abel (father)

Carl Friedrich Abel (baptised 22 December 1723 (Note: The Chambers Biographical Dictionary gives his year of birth erroneously as 1725.) – 20 June 1787) was a German composer of the early Classical era. He was a renowned player of the viola da gamba, and produced significant compositions for that instrument. He was director of music at the Dresden court from 1743, and moved to London in 1759, becoming chamber-musician to Queen Charlotte in 1764. He founded a subscription concert series there with Johann Christian Bach. According to the Catalogue of Works of Carl Friedrich Abel (AbelWV), he left 420 compositions, with a focus on chamber music.

== Life ==
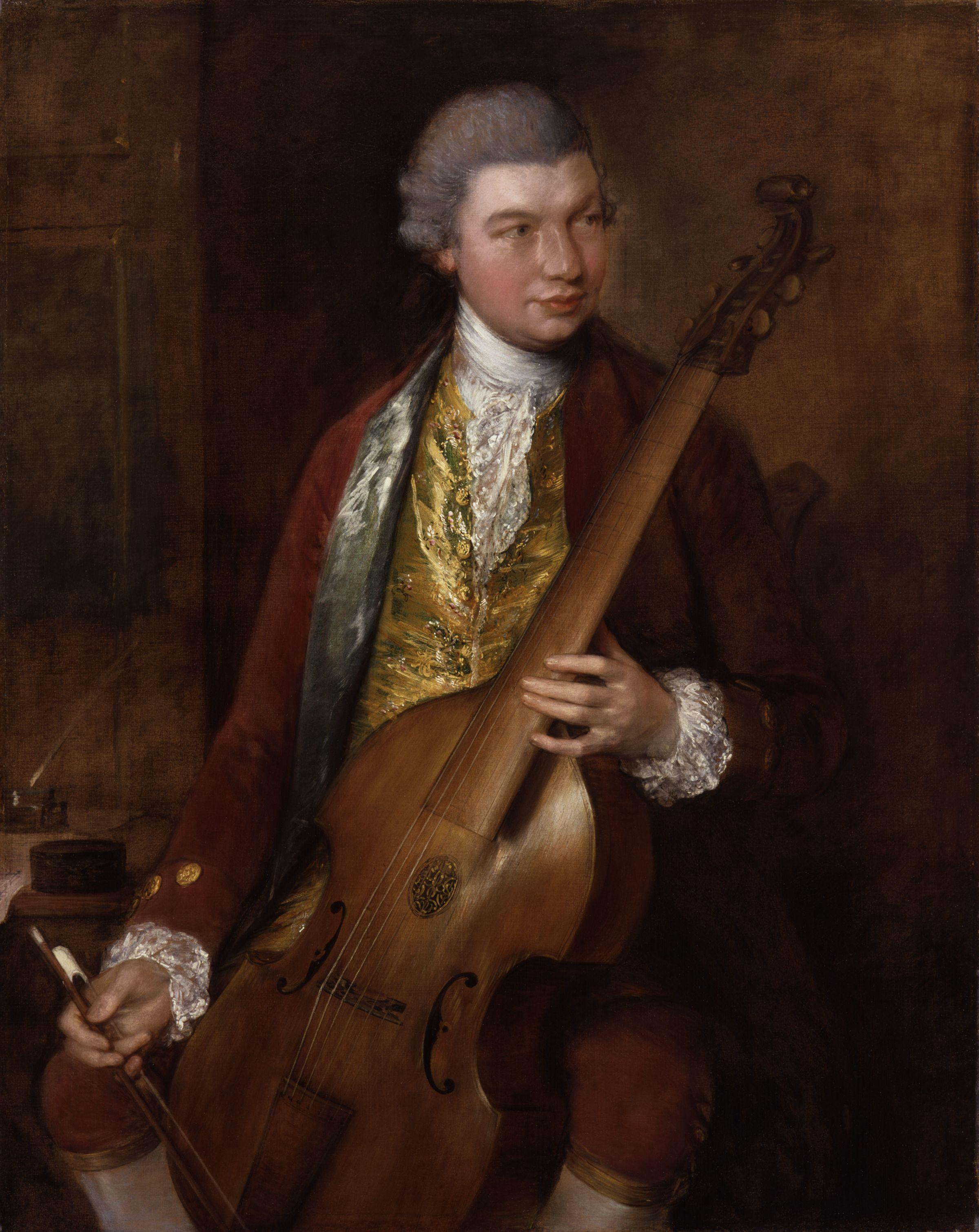
Abel holding his viol, painted by Gainsborough, c. 1765

Abel was born in Köthen, where his father, Christian Ferdinand Abel, had worked for years as the principal viola da gamba and cello player in the court orchestra of Leopold, Prince of Anhalt-Köthen. In 1723 Abel senior became director of the orchestra, when the previous director, Johann Sebastian Bach, moved to Leipzig. The young Abel later boarded at St. Thomas School, Leipzig, where he was taught by Bach.

On Bach's recommendation in 1743 he was able to join Johann Adolph Hasse's orchestra at the Dresden court, where he remained for fifteen years. In 1759 (or 1758 according to Chambers), he went to England and became chamber-musician to Queen Charlotte, in 1764. He gave a concert of his own compositions in London, performing on various instruments, one of which was a five-string cello known as a pentachord, which had been recently invented by John Joseph Merlin.

In 1762, Johann Christian Bach, a son of J. S. Bach, joined him in London, and the friendship between him and Abel led, in 1764 or 1765, to the establishment of the famous Bach-Abel concerts, England's first subscription concerts. In those concerts, many celebrated guest artists appeared, and many works of Haydn received their first English performance.

For ten years the concerts were organized by Teresa Cornelys, a retired Venetian opera singer who owned a concert hall at Carlisle House in Soho Square, then the height of fashionable events. In 1775 the concerts became independent of her, to be continued by Abel and Bach until Bach's death in 1782. Abel still remained in great demand as a player on various instruments new and old. He traveled to Germany and France between 1782 and 1785, and upon his return to London, became a leading member of the Grand Professional Concerts at the Hanover Square Rooms in Soho. Throughout his life he had enjoyed excessive living, and his drinking probably hastened his death.

Abel died in London on 20 June 1787. He was buried in the churchyard of St Pancras Old Church.

== Works ==
One of Abel's works became famous due to a misattribution: in the 19th century, a manuscript symphony in the hand of Wolfgang Amadeus Mozart was catalogued as his Symphony No. 3 in E flat, K. 18, and was published as such in the first complete edition of Mozart's works by Breitkopf & Härtel. Later, it was discovered that this symphony was actually the work of Abel, copied by the boy Mozart, evidently for study purposes, while he was visiting London in 1764. That symphony was originally published as the concluding work in Abel's Six Symphonies, Op. 7.

A first catalogue of Abel's works was published in 1971 by Walter Knape, Abel-Werkverzeichnis, with 233 work numbers.

In 2015 new manuscripts of Abel's viola da gamba music were found in the library of the Adam Mickiewicz University in Poznań, in a collection from the Maltzahn family palace in the town of Milicz in Poland, originally brought back from London by Count Joachim Carl of Maltzan. Many of them were published by Edition Güntersberg.

A new catalogue, of now 420 works, was published by Ortus Musikverlag in 2023, Catalogue of Works of Carl Friedrich Abel or AbelWV, edited by Günter von Zadow. It takes into account many newly discovered works, and additional sources for known works.

=== Major works by opus number ===
From 27 Pieces for Unaccompanied Viola da Gamba, New York. NYp, Drexel 5871 (ca.1790-99): [Arpeggio], AbelWV A1:A26

From 27 Pieces for Unaccompanied Viola da Gamba, New York. NYp, Drexel 5871 (ca.1790-99): Allegro, AbelWV A1:A28

From 27 Pieces for Unaccompanied Viola da Gamba, New York. NYp, Drexel 5871 (ca.1790-99): [Allegro], AbelWV A1:A29

Sonata in G-Major, AbelWV A3 for Unaccompanied Viola da Gamba. Composed for the Lady Pembroke, London. GB-Lbl, Add.Ms.31697 (1760-1770)
Performed by Phillip W. Serna, Viol

Duetto in G major, AbelWV A3:5A from the Maltzan Collection
Performed by ViolMedium - Eric Miller & Phillip W. Serna

- Op. 1: 6 Overtures or Sinfonias (1761)
- Op. 2: 6 Sonatas for keyboard, and violin and cello (ad libitum) (1760)
- Op. 3: 6 Trio Sonatas for 2 violins and basso continuo (1762)
- Op. 4: 6 Overtures or Sinfonias (1762)
- Op. 5: 6 Sonatas for keyboard, and violin and cello (ad libitum) (1762)
- Op. 6: 6 Sonatas for keyboard and flute (1763)
- Op. 7: 6 Symphonies (1767)
- Op. 8: 6 String Quartets (1768)
- Op. 9: 6 Trio Sonatas for violin, cello and basso continuo (1771)
- Op. 10: 6 Symphonies (1771)
- Op. 11: 6 Concerti for keyboard and strings (1771)
- Op. 12: 6 Flute Quartets (1774)
- Op. 13: 6 Sonatas for keyboard and violin (1777)
- Op. 14: 6 Symphonies (1778)
- Op. 15: 6 String Quartets (1780)
- Op. 16: 4 Trio Sonatas for 2 flutes and basso continuo (1781)
- Op. 16: 6 Trio Sonatas for violin, viola and cello (1782)
- Op. 17: 6 Symphonies (1785)
- Op. 18: 6 Sonatas for keyboard and violin (1784)

== Abel Fest ==
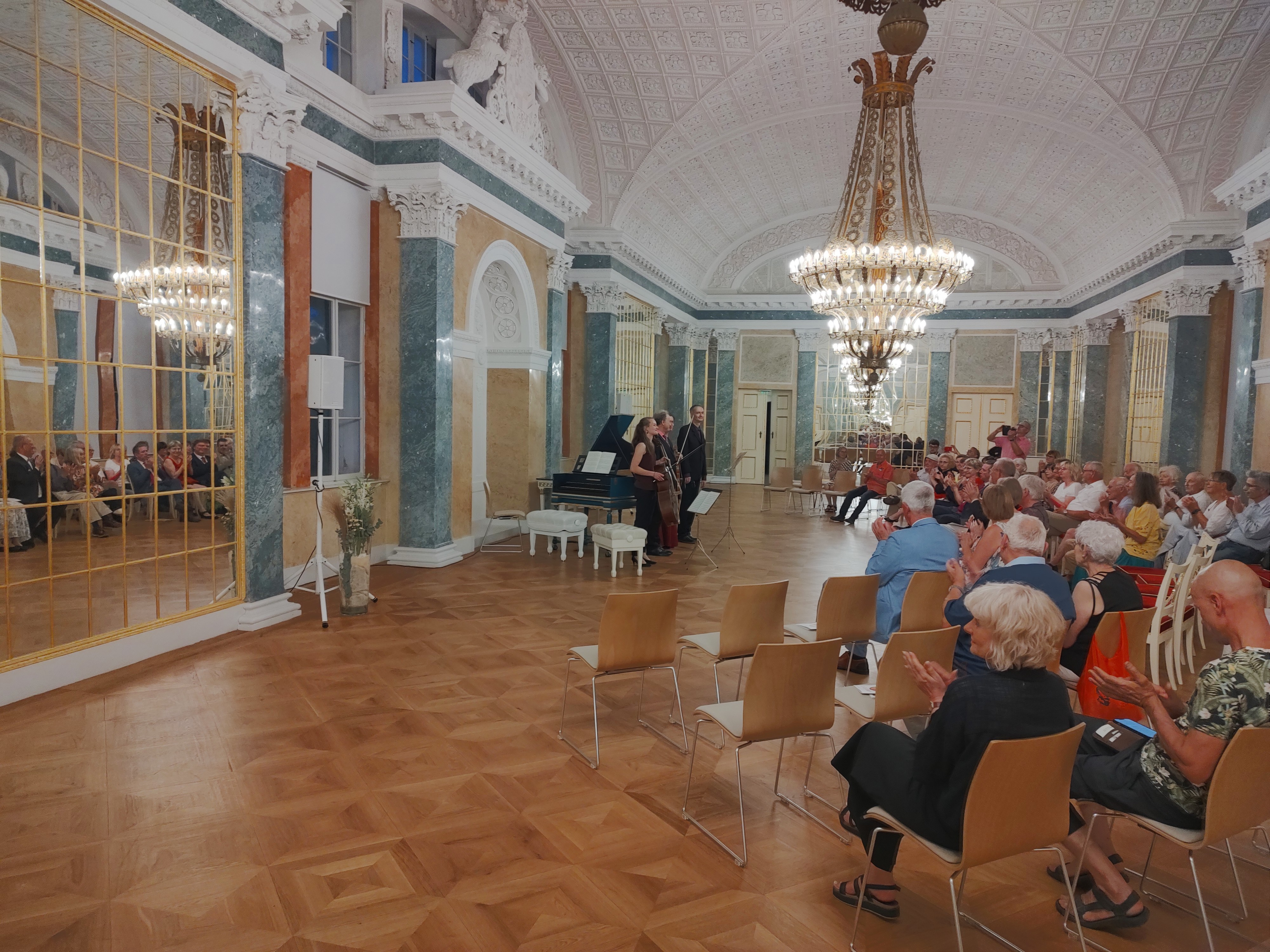
Opening concert of the Abel Fest at the Spiegelsaal of Schloss Köthen

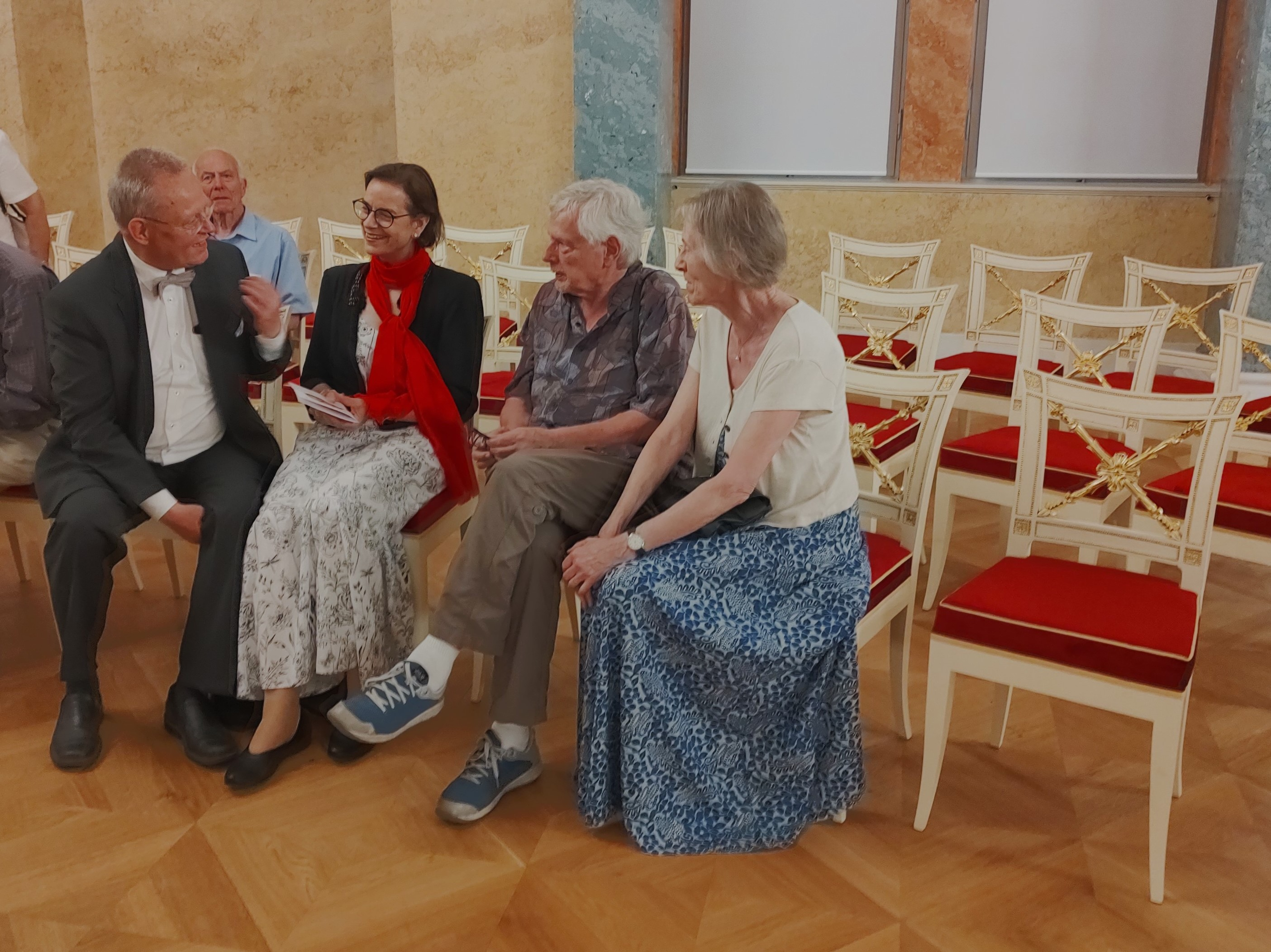
Leonore von Zadow-Reichling and Günter von Zadow (r.) at the concert

As Abel was born in 1723, the city of Köthen announced an international tricentennial festival around his music on four days in June 2023, held at historic locations including the palace and its gardens. It was initiated by gambist and musicologist Thomas Fritzsch. The city also created a biennial Abel Prize. The first recipients in 2023 were Leonore von Zadow-Reichling and Günter von Zadow of Edition Güntersberg for their efforts to retrieve and publish Abel's works. They published more than 150, many as first publications.

== Notes and references ==
Notes
