= Zscheiplitz =

- Ortsteil of Freyburg
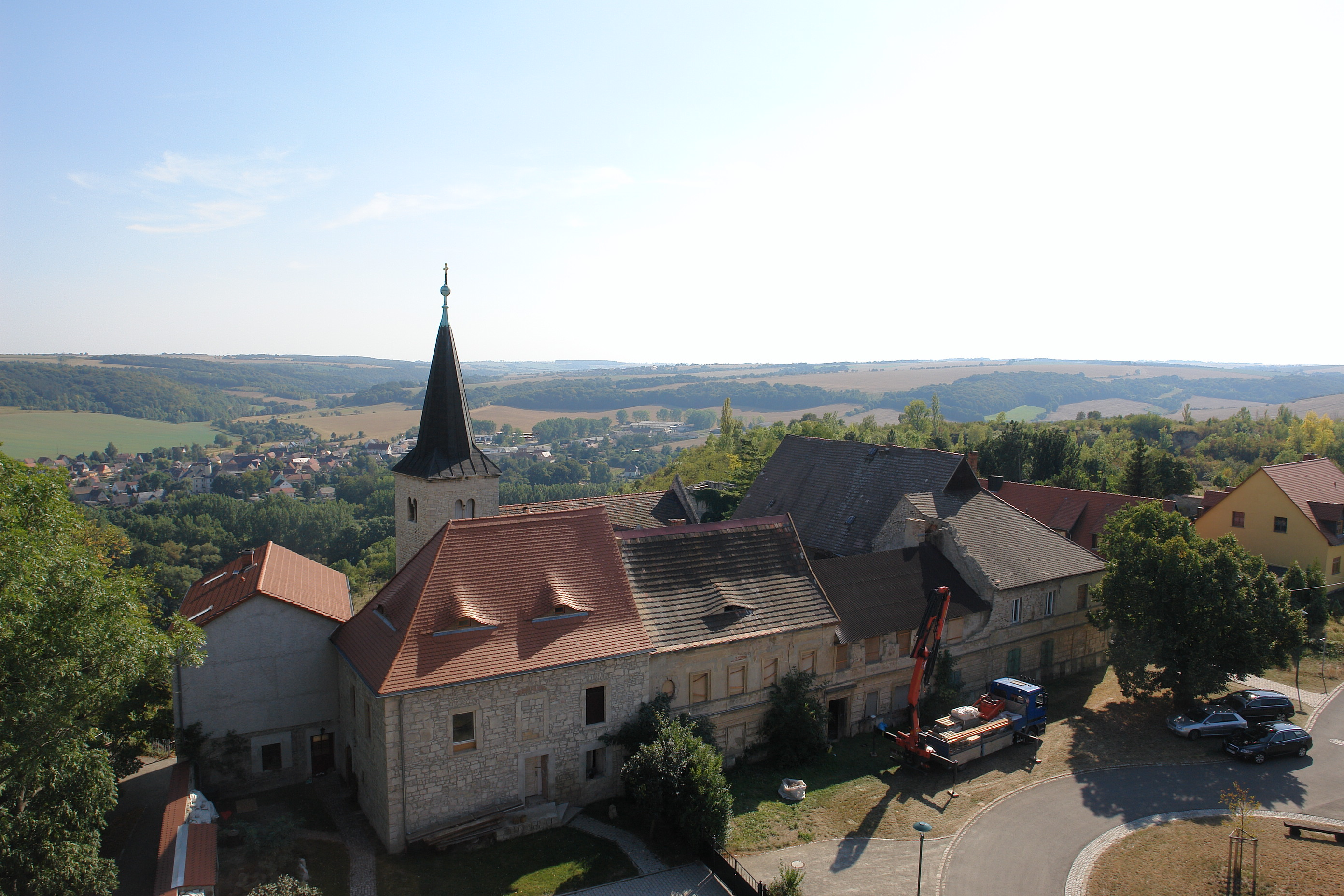
- View of the castle from the water tower
- Interactive map of Zscheiplitz
- Location within Germany Location within Saxony-Anhalt
- Coordinates: 51°12′53″N 11°44′10″E
- Country: Germany
- State: Saxony-Anhalt
- District: Burgenlandkreis
- Town: Freyburg

Population (2006-12-31)
  - Total: 572
- Time zone: UTC+01:00 (CET)
  - Summer (DST): UTC+02:00 (CEST)
- Postal codes: 06632
- Dialling codes: 034464

Zscheiplitz (German pronunciation: [ˈtʃaɪplɪts]) is a village in the southern part of Saxony-Anhalt, Germany, and includes a former Benedictine Monastery.

== Geography ==
The village lies on the Unstrut river, in the municipality of Freyburg, to the north-west of Naumburg, and so in the Verwaltungsgemeinschaft of Unstruttal, in the southern part of Saxony-Anhalt.
