= 12 Fantasias for Solo Violin (Telemann) =

Collection of fantasias composed by Georg Philipp Telemann

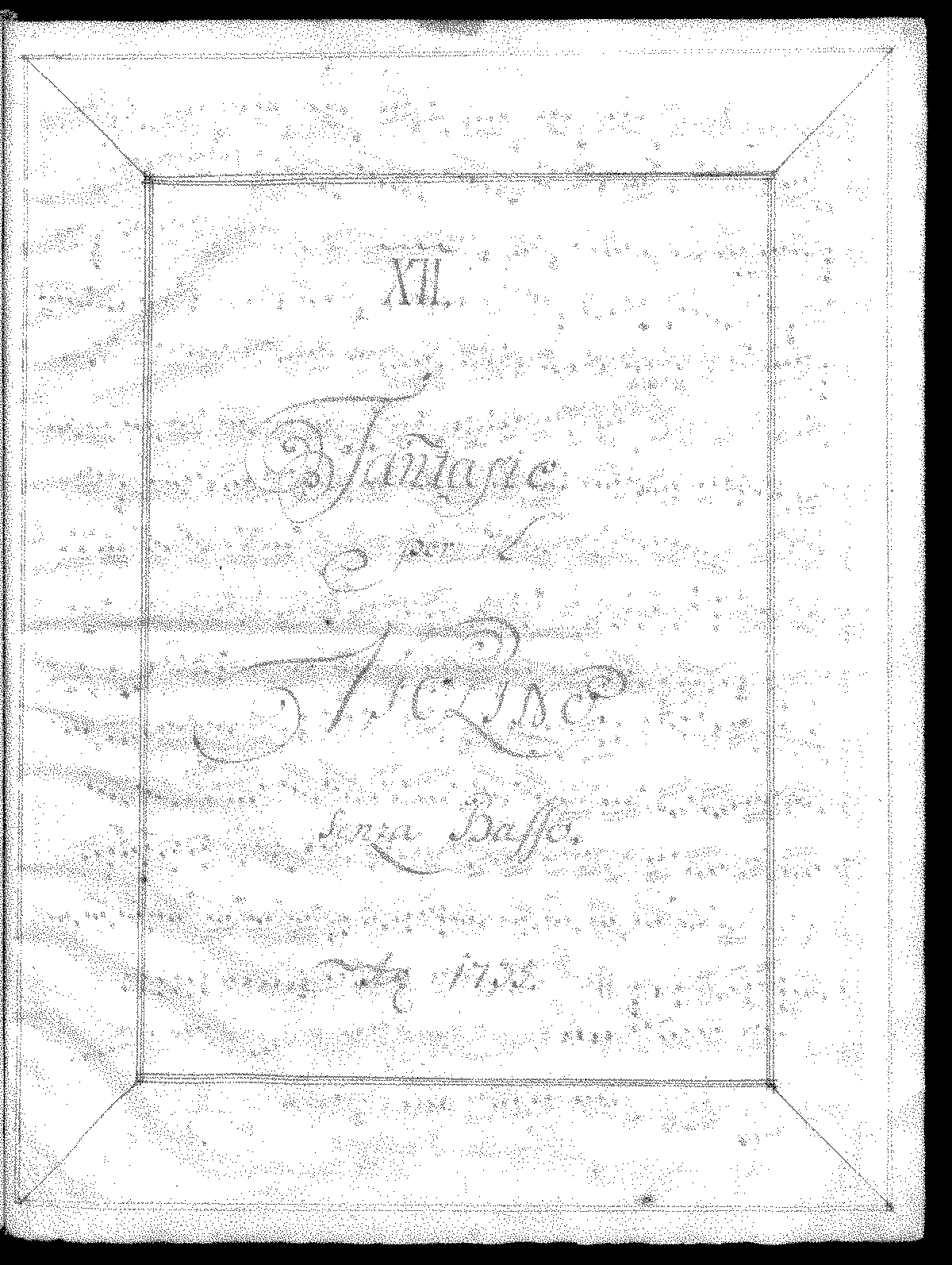
Title page of 12 Fantasias for Solo Violin.

Georg Philipp Telemann's collection of 12 Fantasias for Solo Violin, TWV 40:14–25, was published in Hamburg in 1735. It is one of Telemann's collections of music for unaccompanied instruments, the others being twelve fantasias for solo flute and thirty-six for solo harpsichord that were published in Hamburg in 1732–33, as well as a set of twelve fantasias for solo viola da gamba that was published in the same city in 1735, but were considered lost until a copy of the print was found in a private collection in 2015 by viola da gamba player and musicologist Thomas Fritzsch.

This collection consists of the following works:

1. Fantasia in B♭ major (Largo—Allegro—Grave—Si replica l'allegro)
2. Fantasia in G major (Largo—Allegro—Allegro)
3. Fantasia in F minor (Adagio—Presto—Grave—Vivace)
4. Fantasia in D major (Vivace—Grave—Allegro)
5. Fantasia in A major (Allegro—Presto—Allegro—Presto—Andante—Allegro)
6. Fantasia in E minor (Grave—Presto—Siciliana—Allegro)
7. Fantasia in E♭ major (Dolce—Allegro—Largo—Presto)
8. Fantasia in E major (Piacevolumente—Spirituoso—Allegro)
9. Fantasia in B minor (Siciliana—Vivace—Allegro)
10. Fantasia in D major (Presto—Largo—Allegro)
11. Fantasia in F major (Un poco vivace—Soave—Da capo un poco vivace—Allegro)
12. Fantasia in A minor (Moderato—Vivace—Presto)

This scheme does not resemble that of the twelve flute fantasies, which progress in a roughly stepwise direction from A major to G minor. However, some overall structure seems to be implied: the first movement of Fantasia 7 subtly references the opening of the first fantasia in the collection, indicating that Telemann possibly conceived this work as two groups of 6 fantasias. He has, indeed, described the collection as "12 fantasias ... of which 6 include fugues and 6 are Galanterien", with "fugues" referencing the contrapuntal style of certain fantasias.

Telemann's violin fantasias exhibit mastery of not only compound melodic lines, but also of idiomatic writing for violin, as Telemann himself was a self-taught violinist. Much of the music reveals the influence of Italian sonatas and concertos, but the typical tendency of German solo violin music to rely on polyphony is still present: fantasias 2, 3, 5, 6, and 10 all include fugues and employ much double-stopping.
