= Schloss Köthen =

German schloss

- Interactive map of the Schloss Köthen area

General information
- Status: Museum, concert venue
- Location: Köthen (Anhalt), Saxony-Anhalt, Germany
- Coordinates: 51.7538°N 11.9767°E

Schloss Köthen is a palace (schloss) in Köthen (Anhalt), Germany. Begun as a castle, it was protected by a moat. It was the residence of the Princes and Dukes of Anhalt from 1244 to 1847, and now belongs to a foundation for the preservation of sites in Saxony-Anhalt.

The composer Johann Sebastian Bach was employed there by Leopold, Prince of Anhalt-Köthen. The palace is one of the locations for Köthen's biennial Bach festival.

Since the 19th century, the palace has housed an important bird collection which was sold to Frederick Ferdinand, Duke of Anhalt-Köthen by the ornithologist Johann Friedrich Naumann.

== History ==
Köthen castle was built from 1156 to 1160 on an earlier island castle controlled by the Ascania Counts of Ballenstedt. The town of Köthen was an important trade hub in the realm of the House of Ascania during the reign of Albert the Bear. The castle burned in 1547, leaving only its northern portion. it was renovated into a Baroque palace over the late 16th and then 17th centuries. More renovations, in the interiors, were made in the Neoclassical style from 1821 to 1833.

The building in the town center was the residence of the Princes and Dukes of Anhalt from 1244 to 1847. After 1603, it was the seat of the Anhalt-Köthen line. In 1806, the principality was elevated to duchy. With the death of Duke Henry in 1847, the Anhalt-Köthen line of the House of Ascania became extinct.

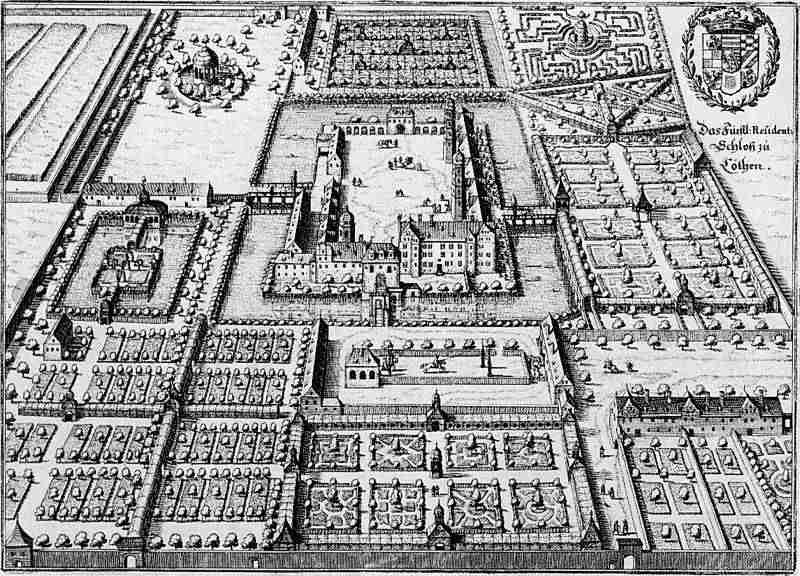
Engraving of the property c. 1650

In the 17th century, the palace was the seat of the Fruitbearing Society, an early society for the promotion of the German language.

=== Bach at Köthen ===
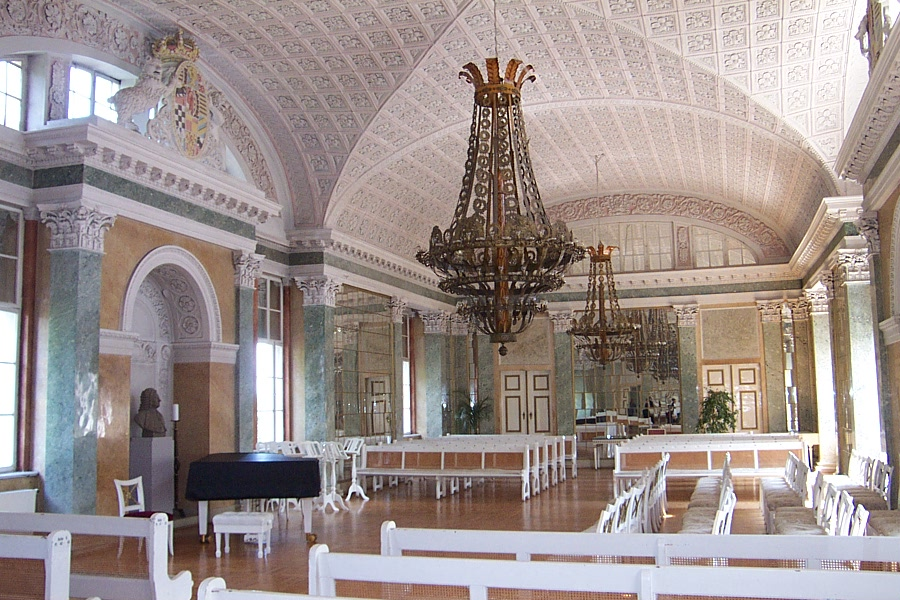
Spiegelsaal, now Bachsaal

Johann Sebastian Bach worked in Köthen from 1717 to 1723 as Hofkapellmeister of Prince Leopold. Bach's first wife Maria Barbara died in Köthen in 1720. His second wife Ana Magdalena was employed at the court as a singer at the time of their marriage in 1721.

Bach worked on important instrumental works during these years, including the Brandenburg Concertos (Note: In 1719, on the recommendation of Bach, the court acquired a new harpsichord from Michael Mietke. This was probably the instrument for which Bach composed Brandenburg concerto no.5 as a show-piece.) and the first book of The Well-Tempered Clavier. The court was Reformed, therefore sacred music was not required, but Bach composed a series of secular cantatas such as Der Himmel dacht auf Anhalts Ruhm und Glück, BWV 66a, for the prince's birthday, and Die Zeit, die Tag und Jahre macht, BWV 134a for New Year's Day. After the Bach family moved to Leipzig in 1723, Bach continued to write occasional pieces for the court for a few years until the prince died.

== Grounds ==
The grounds of Schloss Köthen is divided into three portions – the Schlosspark and the other and inner areas. The inner area stands on top of the original castle and is separated from the rest of the castle grounds by a moat crossed by three bridges.

Located next to the entrance to the castle grounds is the Prinzessinhaus (Princess's House), built in 1779. It served as the Hofmarschall's residence until 1847. As of 2018, the building is used as office space for Köthen Culture and Marketing GmbH, Köthener Bach GmbH, and the New Fruitbearing Society. The building also houses a bus driver's lounge.

=== Outer buildings ===
The outer area of the palace is made up by the Marstall (Royal stable), Reithalle (Riding hall), and the Remisenhaus (coach house).

The stables were rebuilt along the from 1757 to 1767 according to Rococo designs by Emanuel Lebrecht Rothe. The building is two stories tall and has on its exteriors mansard roofs and risaliten emblazoned with an escutcheons for the stable gates. Horses were kept privately here until 1945. Since 2010, part of the Bach museum has taken up the ground floor.

The Reithalle was built by Gottfried Bandhauer. It was destroyed by fire in 1940 and rebuilt as a concert hall and inaugurated on 29 March 2008. The coach house was built in 1833 by Conrad Hengst according to plans by Bandhauer. Along with the Reithalle, the Remisenhaus is an event venue. A plaque located outside the building is dedicated to Bandhauer.

=== Inner buildings ===
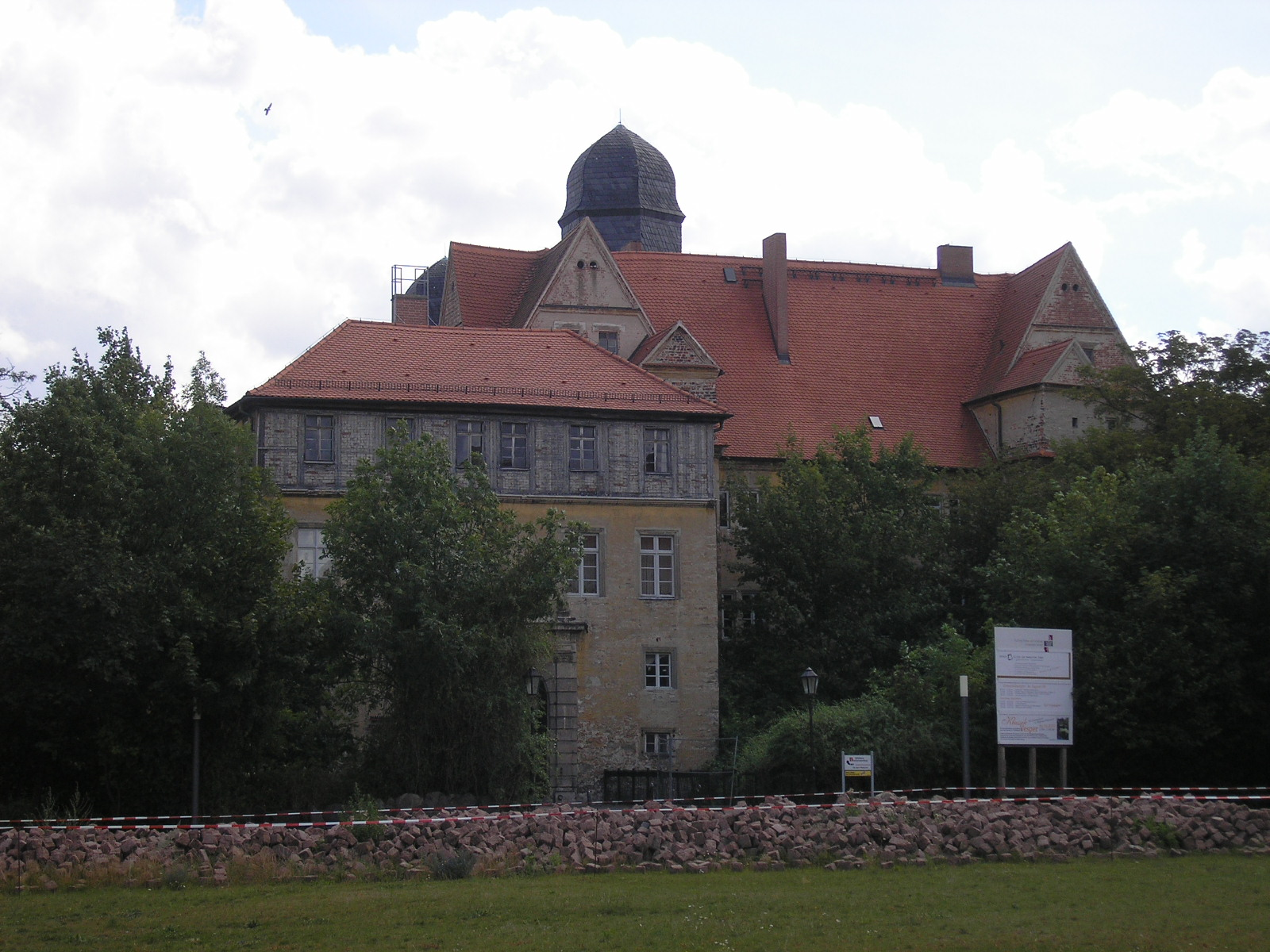
The Johann-Georg and Ludwig buildings seen from the south.

The Johann-Georg-Bau (John-George building), across the moat to the east from the outer buildings, was a gatehouse in the original castle. It was remodeled in 1597 at the behest of Prince John George I, and again in 1670 for Prince Emmanuel Lebrecht, but still retains its Renaissance-era round arch. The building was destroyed in 1944 during World War II.

The Ludwigsbau (Ludwig building) was built in the style of Upper Silesian castles and has Italiante influence in its plan.

== Museums ==
The Reithalle contains most of the Bach museum, though part of the museum is also extant on the ground floor of the Marstall.

The upper floor of the Ferdinandbau houses the Naumann-Museum, an ornithological museum dedicated to Johann Friedrich Naumann founded in 1835. The museum contains about 1300 items, spread out over 113 showcases. They include taxidermied bird specimens, personal effects of Naumann's, engravings of birds, and his hunting and fishing equipment. In 2015, the Federal Government recognized the Naumann-Museum as a "nationally valuable cultural heritage" (National wertvolles Kulturerbe).

== Events ==
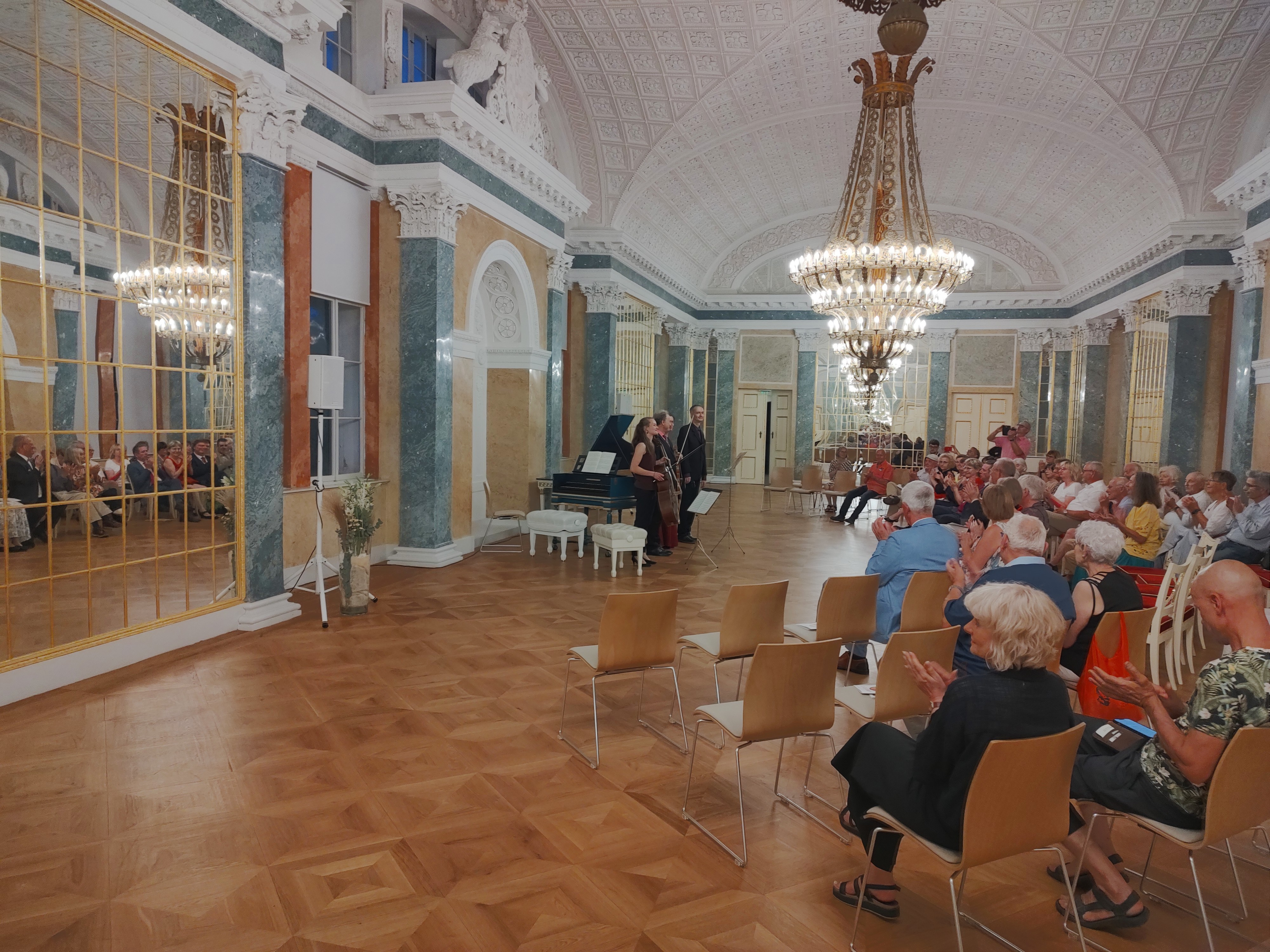
Opening concert of the Abel Fest at the Spiegelsaal, 2023

The Spiegelsaal is used for events, such as the biennial Bach festival and the Abel Fest, first held in 2023 to celebrate the tercentenary of Carl Friedrich Abel. The gambist and composer was born in Köthen and worked mostly in London.

Köthen Palace and Gardens are part of the Saxony-Anhalt Garden Dreams project.

== Notes ==
=== References ===
- Krickerberg, Dieter (2001). "Mietke". The New Grove Dictionary of Music and Musicians (2nd ed.). Oxford University Press. doi:10.1093/gmo/9781561592630.article.43250. (subscription required)

=== Online sources ===
- "Schloss Köthen – Wirkungsstätte von Johann Sebastian Bach" (in German). Saxony-Anhalt Cultural Foundation.
- Weihmann, Daniel. "Das Köthener Schloss". Köthener Land (in German).
- "Naumann-Museum" (in German). Köthen Kultur und Marketing GmbH.
- "Schloss Köthen" (in German). City of Köthen.
- "Prinzessinhaus" (in German). City of Köthen.
- "Marstall" (in German). City of Köthen.
- "Reithalle" (in German). City of Köthen.
- "Remisenhaus" (in German). City of Köthen.
- "Ludwigsbau" (in German). City of Köthen.
- "Johann-Georg-Bau" (in German). City of Köthen.
- "Bach in Köthen" (in German). City of Köthen.
- "Abel-Fest im Spiegelsaal Schloss Köthen". Kulturstiftung Sachsen-Anhalt (in German). 2023.
- "Vom 22. bis 25. Juni: Köthen lädt ein zum Abel-Fest". Leipziger Zeitung (in German). 14 June 2023.
