= 12 Fantasias for Solo Flute =

Musical work by Georg Philipp Telemann

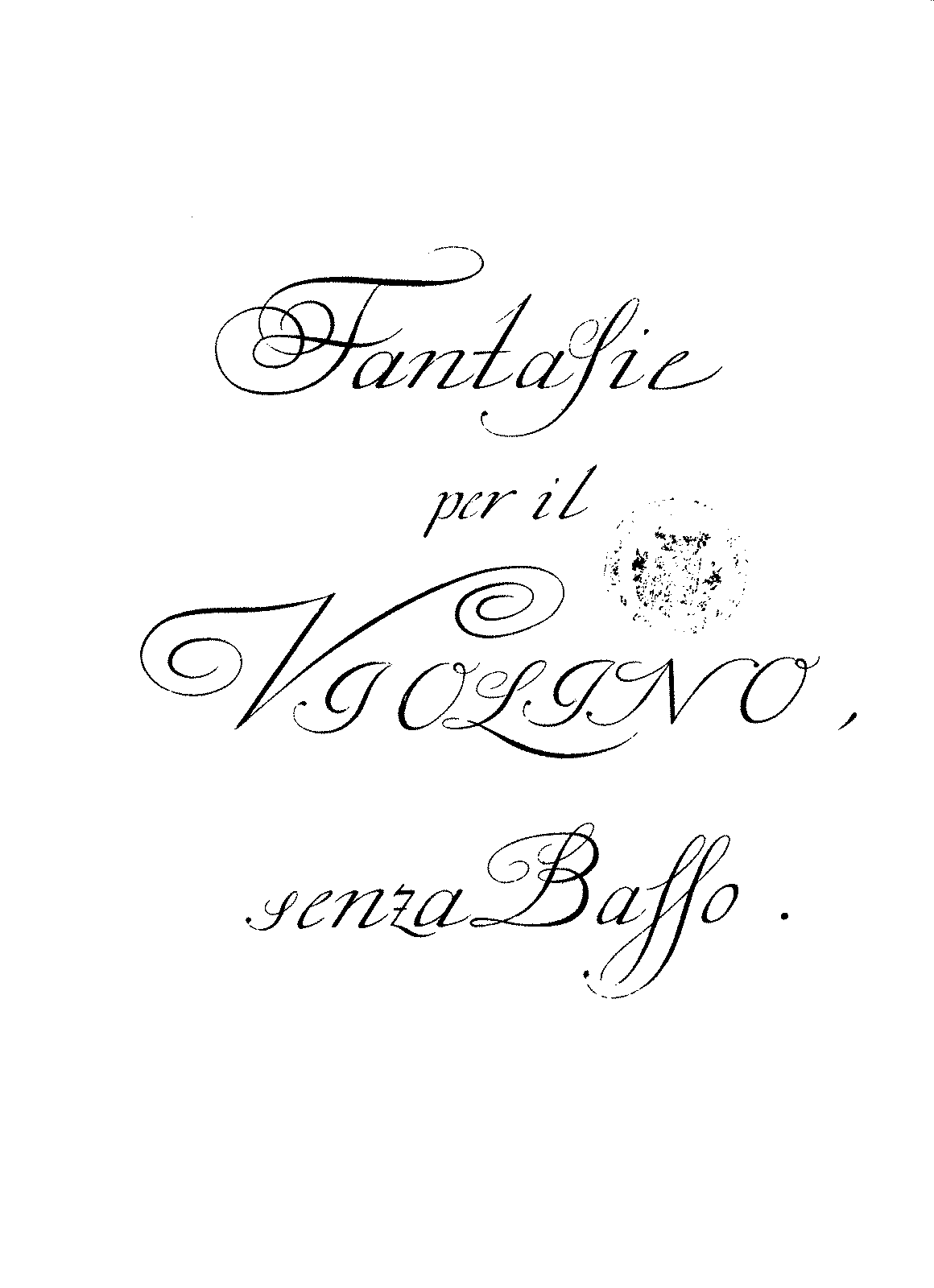
Title page of 12 Fantasias for Flute without Bass.

Georg Philipp Telemann's 12 fantaisies à traversière sans basse, 12 Fantasias for Solo Flute, TWV 40:2–13, were published in Hamburg in 1732–33. An extant copy of the publication, conserved in Brussels, has a spurious title page reading Fantasie per il Violino senza Basso (Fantasias for Solo Violin). The set is one of Telemann's collections of fantasias for unaccompanied instruments, the others being a set of thirty-six for harpsichord, also published in 1732–33, and two sets published in 1735: twelve for solo violin and twelve for viola da gamba.

Telemann's solo flute fantasias are alone in the Baroque repertoire to include movements seemingly impossible on flute: fugues (fantasias 2, 6, and 8–11), a French overture (fantasia 7) and a passacaglia (fantasia 5). In 2012, an arrangement for viola solo was published by Euprint. In this arrangement, through the use of double stops, some many-voiced parts appear as real polyphonic pieces.

== Structure ==
This work comprises the following:

1. Fantasia in A major (Vivace – Allegro)
2. Fantasia in A minor (Grave – Vivace – Adagio – Allegro)
3. Fantasia in B minor (Largo – Vivace – Largo – Vivace – Allegro)
4. Fantasia in B♭ major (Andante – Allegro – Presto)
5. Fantasia in C major (Presto – Largo – Presto – Dolce – Allegro – Allegro)
6. Fantasia in D minor (Dolce – Allegro – Spirituoso)
7. Fantasia in D major (Alla francese – Presto)
8. Fantasia in E minor (Largo – Spirituoso – Allegro)
9. Fantasia in E major (Affettuoso – Allegro – Grave – Vivace)
10. Fantasia in F♯ minor (A Tempo giusto – Presto – Moderato)
11. Fantasia in G major (Allegro – Adagio – Vivace – Allegro)
12. Fantasia in G minor (Grave – Allegro – Grave – Allegro – Dolce – Allegro – Presto)

The collection is arranged by key, progressing more or less stepwise from A major to G minor. Telemann deliberately avoided keys that are impractical on the one-key flute, i.e. B major, C minor, F minor and F♯ major. There are two ways to view the overall structure of the collection: one way, in which the work is divided into two parts, is suggested by the fact that Fantasia 7 begins with a French overture, indicating a start of a new section. This device was also later used by Johann Sebastian Bach in Variation 16 of his Goldberg Variations. Another was proposed by scholar Wolfgang Hirschmann: there are four modal groups of three fantasias: major-minor-minor, major-major-minor, major-minor-major, and minor-major-minor.
