= Departmental Council of Aube =

Departmental legislature in France

- Logo of the Council

Leadership
- President: Philippe Pichery, DVD

Website
- www.aube.fr

The Departmental Council of Aube (French: Conseil départemental de l'Aube) is the deliberative assembly of the French department of Aube. Its headquarters are in Troyes.

It includes 34 departmental councilors elected from the 17 cantons of Aube.

== Executive ==
=== President ===
The president of the departmental council is Philippe Pichery (DVD). He was elected on 23 May 2017, following the resignation of Philippe Adnot.

=== Vice-presidents ===
In addition to the president, the executive has 9 vice-presidents.

Vice-presidents of the Departmental Council of Aube (since 2021)
Order	Name	Canton (constituency)	Delegation
1st	Bernard de La Hamayde	Bar-sur-Seine	Social action, health, autonomy
2nd	Élisabeth Philippon	Troyes-1	Social action, health, autonomy
3rd	Sibylle Bertail-Fassaert	Troyes-5	Education, citizenship, sport
4th	Jérôme Bonnefoi	Romilly-sur-Seine	Education, citizenship, sport
5th	Claude Homehr	Creney-près-Troyes	Economy, employment, sustainable development
6th	Anne-Marie Zeltz	Troyes-2	Economy, employment, sustainable development
7th	Alain Balland	Saint-André-les-Vergers	Cohesion and beautification of territories, tourism, culture
8th	Valéry Denis	Troyes-2	Cohesion and beautification of territories, tourism, culture
9th	Philippe Dallemagne	Bar-sur-Aube	Finance, personnel, public procurement, heritage, technology
10th	Marie-Noëlle Rigollot	Bar-sur-Aube	Finance, personnel, public procurement, heritage, technology

== Current Composition ==
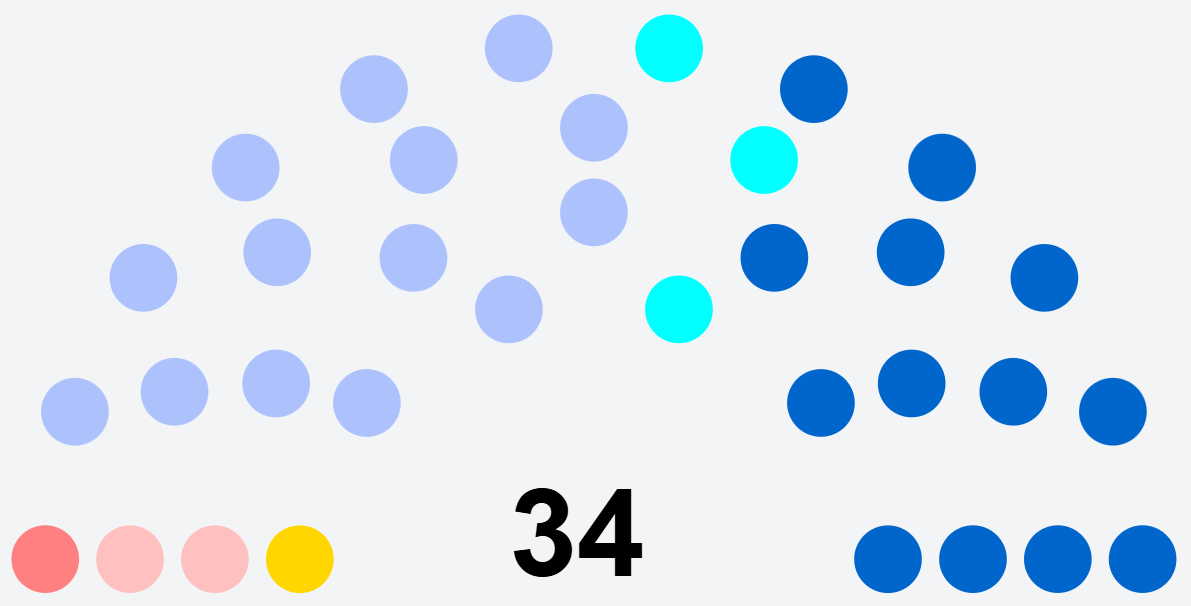

PS - 1 seat

Miscellaneous left - 2 seats

RE - 1 seat

Miscellaneous right - 14 seats

UDI - 3 seat

LR - 13 seats
