= Canton of Troyes-3 =

Coordinates: 48°18′32″N 4°04′05″E

- Canton
- Situation of the canton of Troyes-3 in the department of Aube
- Country: France
- Region: Grand Est
- Department: Aube
- No. of communes: {{{nbcomm}}}
- Population (2023): 21,758
- INSEE code: 1014

The canton of Troyes-3 is a canton of the Aube department, in northern France. Since the French canton reorganisation which came into effect in March 2015, the communes of the canton of Troyes-3 are:

1. La Chapelle-Saint-Luc
2. Troyes (partly)
