= Château de Droupt-Saint-Basle =

French castle

Coordinates: 48°28′50″N 3°56′08″E

The Château de Droupt-Saint-Basle is a castle and château in the commune of Droupt-Saint-Basle in the Aube département of France.

== History ==
It was mentioned in 1206 as belonging to Girard, lord of Droupt. In 1580, the mayor of Troyes, Jean Mairat obtained the lands of Droupt and was authorised by to construct moats, drawbridges and walls. In 1586, he built a house there. In 1714, it became the property of the Chavaudon family, through Pierre Guillaume, Abbot of Notre-Dame de Mores. He and his brother, Etienne-Paul, undertook works on the buildings.

The edifice was added to the list of monuments historiques in 1987 and 1993. The Paupe family who maintain it have installed a museum of popular arts.

== Description ==
It still has water-filled moats, a drawbridge for carts and another for pedestrians in a monumental doorway. Three buildings arranged in a U-shape overlook a courtyard with several lawns and boxwood at the corners. A corner tower is a dovecote.

== See also ==
- List of castles in France
