= Noes =

Noes may be:

- the plural of no
- Noës, a constituent village of Sierre, Switzerland
- Nóēs, a river name mentioned by Herodotus (see Novae (fortress)#Name of the site)

== See also ==
- Les Noës, a commune in the Loire department of France
- Les Noës-près-Troyes, a commune in the Aube department of France
