= Croix la Beigne =

Coordinates: 48°17′28.3″N 4°0′57.2″E

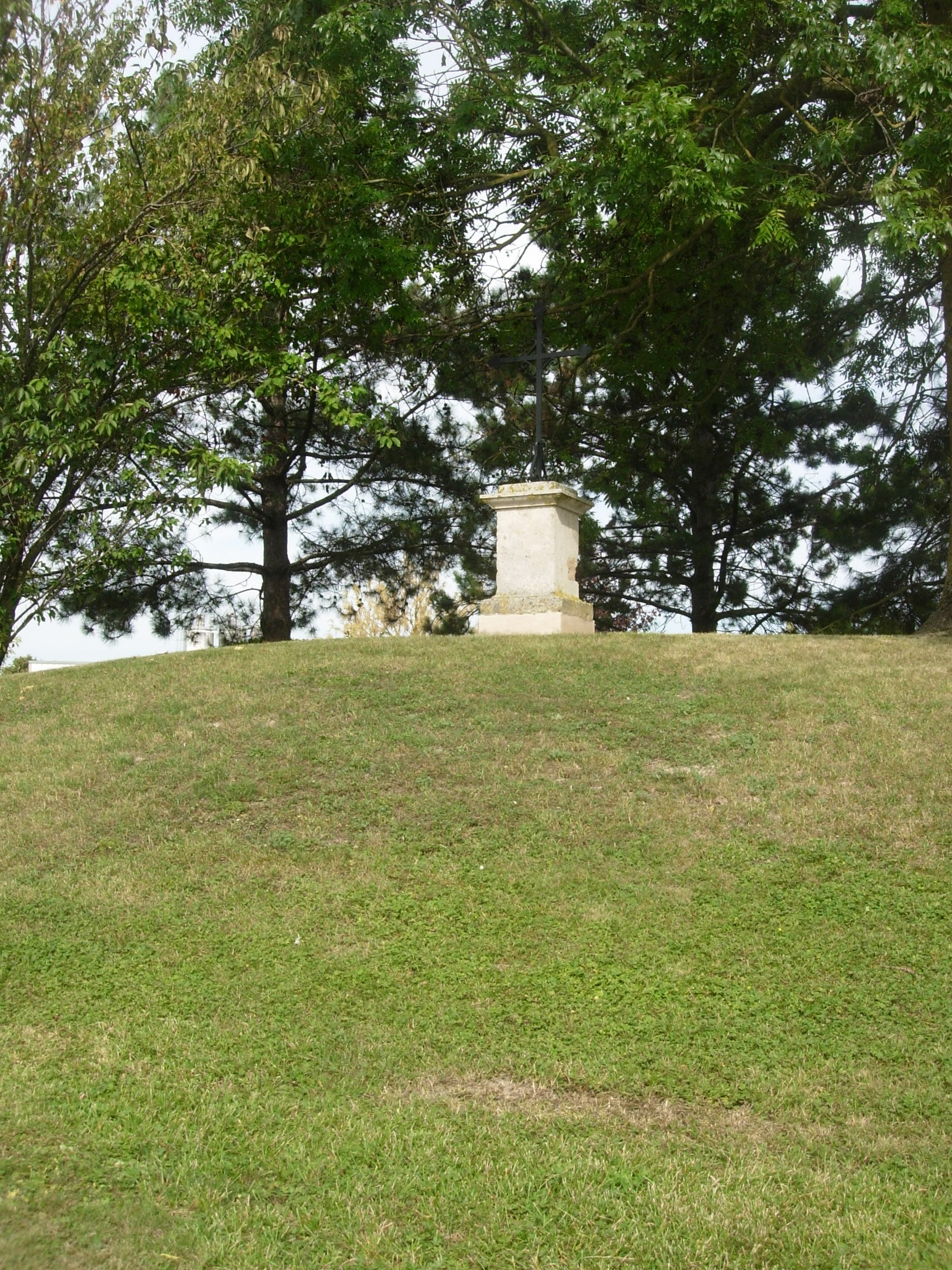

The Croix La Beigne or Croix la Motte is a cross located in the commune of Sainte-Savine (Aube department) in north-central France.

The cross was built on a protohistoric tumulus (diameter : 15m - height : 3m), which is designated as monument historique listed by the French Ministry of Culture in 1965.
