= Arrondissements of the Aube department =

Administrative divisions of Aube, France

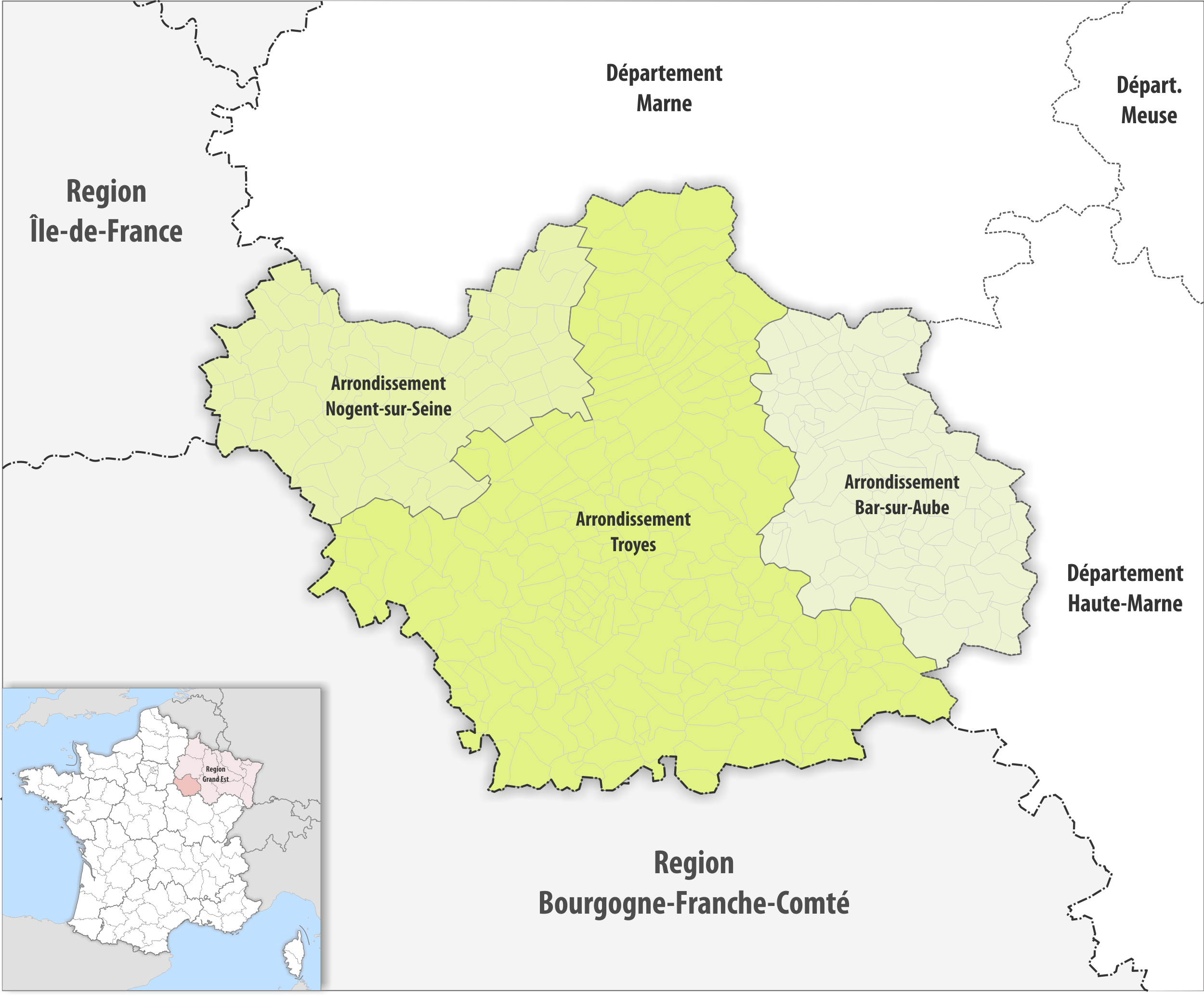
Map of arrondissements of the Aube department.

The 3 arrondissements of the Aube department are:

1. Arrondissement of Bar-sur-Aube, (subprefecture: Bar-sur-Aube) with 108 communes. The population of the arrondissement was 27,162 in 2021.
2. Arrondissement of Nogent-sur-Seine, (subprefecture: Nogent-sur-Seine) with 79 communes. The population of the arrondissement was 54,005 in 2021.
3. Arrondissement of Troyes, (prefecture of the Aube department: Troyes) with 244 communes. The population of the arrondissement was 230,162 in 2021.

== History ==
In 1800 the arrondissements of Troyes, Arcis-sur-Aube, Bar-sur-Aube, Bar-sur-Seine and Nogent-sur-Seine were established. The arrondissements of Arcis-sur-Aube and Bar-sur-Seine were disbanded in 1926.

The borders of the arrondissements of Aube were modified in January 2018:

- one commune from the arrondissement of Nogent-sur-Seine to the arrondissement of Troyes
- four communes from the arrondissement of Troyes to the arrondissement of Bar-sur-Aube
