= Canton of Troyes-2 =

Coordinates: 48°18′18″N 4°03′11″E

- Canton
- Situation of the canton of Troyes-2 in the department of Aube
- Country: France
- Region: Grand Est
- Department: Aube
- No. of communes: {{{nbcomm}}}
- Population (2023): 21,302
- INSEE code: 1013

The canton of Troyes-2 is a canton of the Aube department, in northern France. Since the French canton reorganisation which came into effect in March 2015, the communes of the canton of Troyes-2 are:

1. Les Noës-près-Troyes
2. Sainte-Savine
3. Troyes (partly)
