= La Chapelle-Saint-Luc =

Commune in Grand Est, France

- Commune
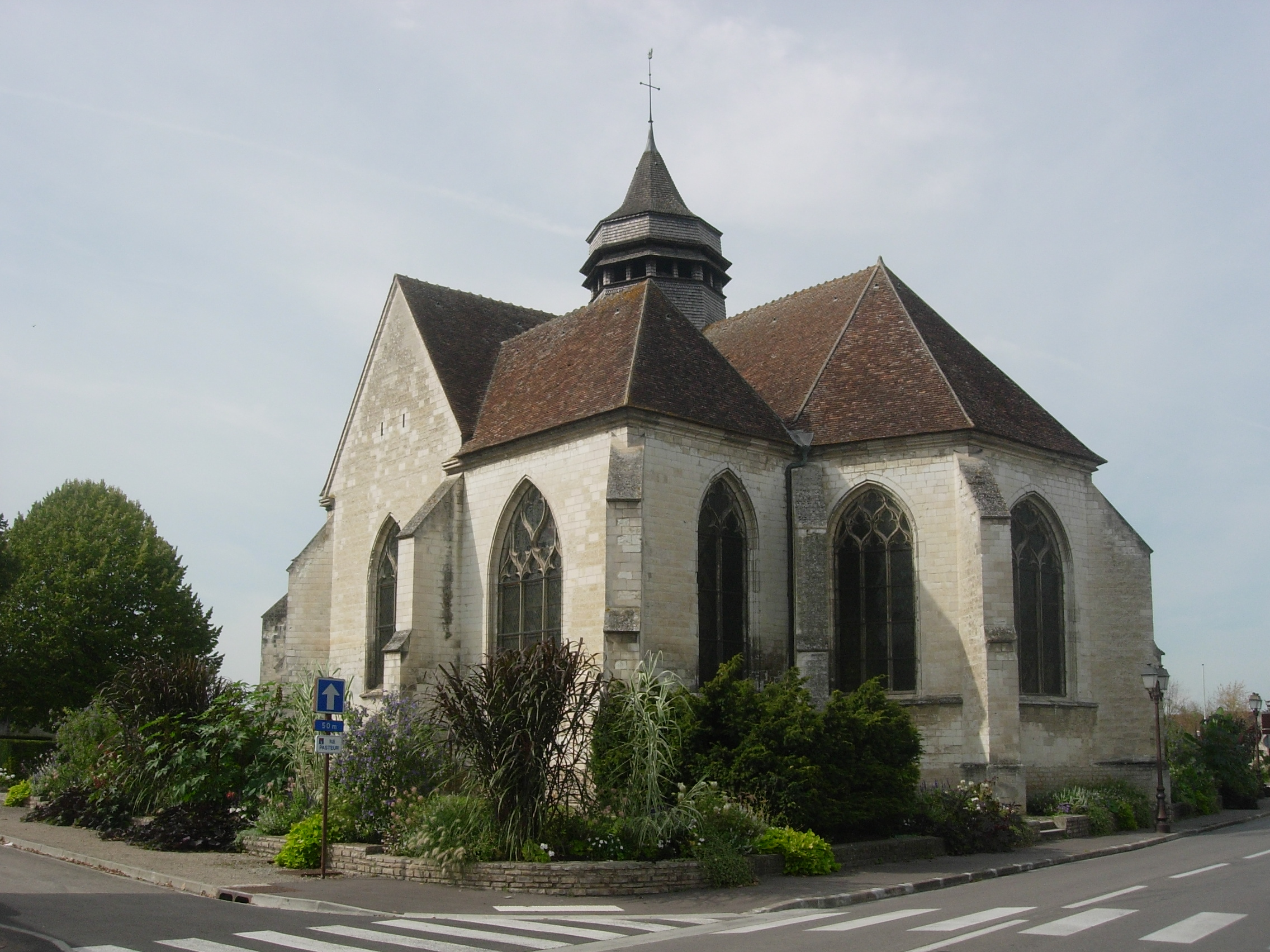
- The church in La Chapelle-Saint-Luc

- Coat of arms
- Location of La Chapelle-Saint-Luc
- Location within France Location within Grand Est
- Coordinates: 48°18′45″N 4°02′43″E
- Country: France
- Region: Grand Est
- Department: Aube
- Arrondissement: Troyes
- Canton: Troyes-3
- Intercommunality: CA Troyes Champagne Métropole

Government
  - Mayor (2020–2026): Olivier Girardin
- Area^{1}: 10.48 km^{2} (4.05 sq mi)
- Elevation: 100 m (330 ft)
- Highest elevation: 164 m (538 ft)
- Lowest elevation: 98 m (322 ft)
- Population (2023): 12,648
  - Density: 1,207/km^{2} (3,126/sq mi)
- Time zone: UTC+01:00 (CET)
  - Summer (DST): UTC+02:00 (CEST)
- INSEE/Postal code: 10081 /10600
- ^{1} French Land Register data, which excludes lakes, ponds, glaciers > 1 km^{2} (0.386 sq mi or 247 acres) and river estuaries.

La Chapelle-Saint-Luc (French pronunciation: [la ʃapɛl sɛ̃ lyk]) is a commune in the Aube department in north-central France, right next to Troyes.

== Population ==
Historical population

Year	Pop.	±% p.a.
1793	330	—
1800	310	−0.89%
1806	349	+1.99%
1821	259	−1.97%
1831	348	+3.00%
1836	367	+1.07%
1841	373	+0.32%
1846	398	+1.31%
1851	409	+0.55%
1856	378	−1.56%
1861	383	+0.26%
1866	373	−0.53%
1872	402	+1.26%
1876	480	+4.53%
1881	569	+3.46%
1886	627	+1.96%
1891	588	−1.28%
1896	803	+6.43%
1901	881	+1.87%

Year	Pop.	±% p.a.
1906	938	+1.26%
1911	1,117	+3.55%
1921	1,252	+1.15%
1926	1,659	+5.79%
1931	1,986	+3.66%
1936	2,250	+2.53%
1946	2,088	−0.74%
1954	3,483	+6.61%
1962	4,594	+3.52%
1968	6,528	+6.03%
1975	15,136	+12.77%
1982	16,241	+1.01%
1990	15,815	−0.33%
1999	14,447	−1.00%
2007	13,401	−0.94%
2012	12,878	−0.79%
2017	12,319	−0.88%
2023	12,648	+0.44%

Source: EHESS and INSEE (1968-2023)

== See also ==
- Communes of the Aube department
