= Canton of Troyes-5 =

Coordinates: 48°17′13″N 4°04′52″E

- Canton
- Situation of the canton of Troyes-5 in the department of Aube
- Country: France
- Region: Grand Est
- Department: Aube
- No. of communes: {{{nbcomm}}}
- Population (2023): 18,316
- INSEE code: 1016

The canton of Troyes-5 is a canton of the arrondissement of Troyes, in the Aube department, in northern France. Since the French canton reorganisation which came into effect in March 2015, the canton of Troyes-5 covers part of the commune of Troyes.
