= Sainte-Savine =

Commune in Grand Est, France

- Commune
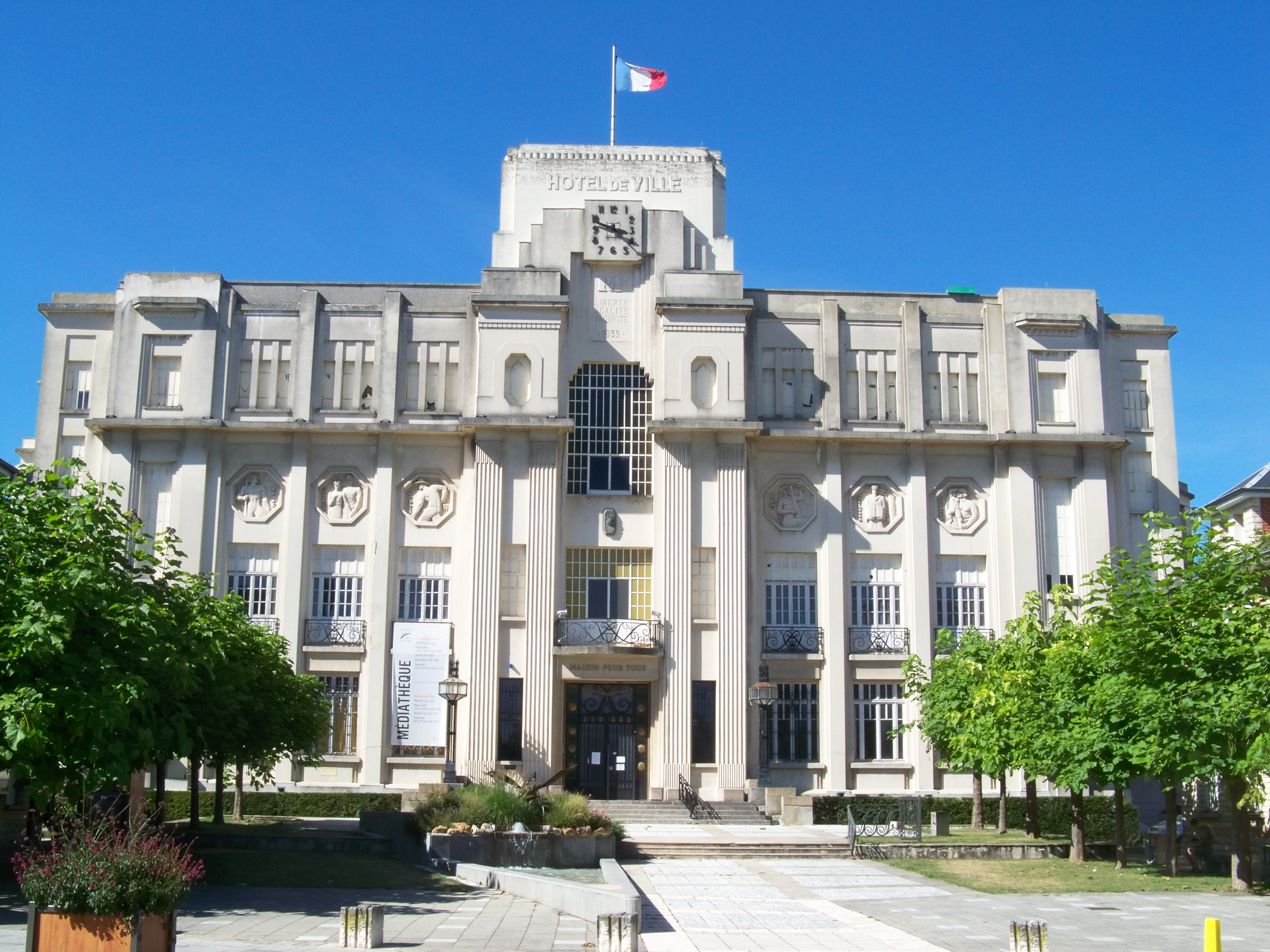
- The town hall in Sainte-Savine

- Coat of arms
- Location of Sainte-Savine
- Location within France Location within Grand Est
- Coordinates: 48°17′44″N 4°02′59″E
- Country: France
- Region: Grand Est
- Department: Aube
- Arrondissement: Troyes
- Canton: Troyes-2
- Intercommunality: CA Troyes Champagne Métropole

Government
  - Mayor (2020–2026): Arnaud Magloire
- Area^{1}: 7.55 km^{2} (2.92 sq mi)
- Highest elevation: 150 m (490 ft)
- Lowest elevation: 106 m (348 ft)
- Population (2023): 10,289
  - Density: 1,360/km^{2} (3,530/sq mi)
- Time zone: UTC+01:00 (CET)
  - Summer (DST): UTC+02:00 (CEST)
- INSEE/Postal code: 10362 /10300
- ^{1} French Land Register data, which excludes lakes, ponds, glaciers > 1 km^{2} (0.386 sq mi or 247 acres) and river estuaries.

Sainte-Savine (French pronunciation: [sɛ̃t savin]) is a commune in the Aube department in north-central France.

== Population ==
Historical population

Year	Pop.	±% p.a.
1793	691	—
1800	679	−0.25%
1806	703	+0.58%
1821	623	−0.80%
1831	739	+1.72%
1836	890	+3.79%
1841	946	+1.23%
1846	1,056	+2.22%
1851	1,103	+0.87%
1856	1,090	−0.24%
1861	1,326	+4.00%
1866	1,480	+2.22%
1872	1,920	+4.43%
1876	2,577	+7.63%
1881	3,802	+8.09%
1886	4,614	+3.95%
1891	5,253	+2.63%
1896	5,815	+2.05%
1901	6,114	+1.01%

Year	Pop.	±% p.a.
1906	6,527	+1.32%
1911	6,848	+0.96%
1921	7,046	+0.29%
1926	8,228	+3.15%
1931	9,650	+3.24%
1936	10,406	+1.52%
1946	11,036	+0.59%
1954	10,947	−0.10%
1962	11,864	+1.01%
1968	11,622	−0.34%
1975	10,561	−1.36%
1982	9,614	−1.33%
1990	9,495	−0.16%
1999	10,125	+0.72%
2007	10,110	−0.02%
2012	10,100	−0.02%
2017	10,573	+0.92%
2023	10,289	−0.45%

Source: EHESS and INSEE (1968-2023)

== See also ==
- Communes of the Aube department
- Croix la Beigne
