= Les Noës-près-Troyes =

Commune in Grand Est, France

- Commune
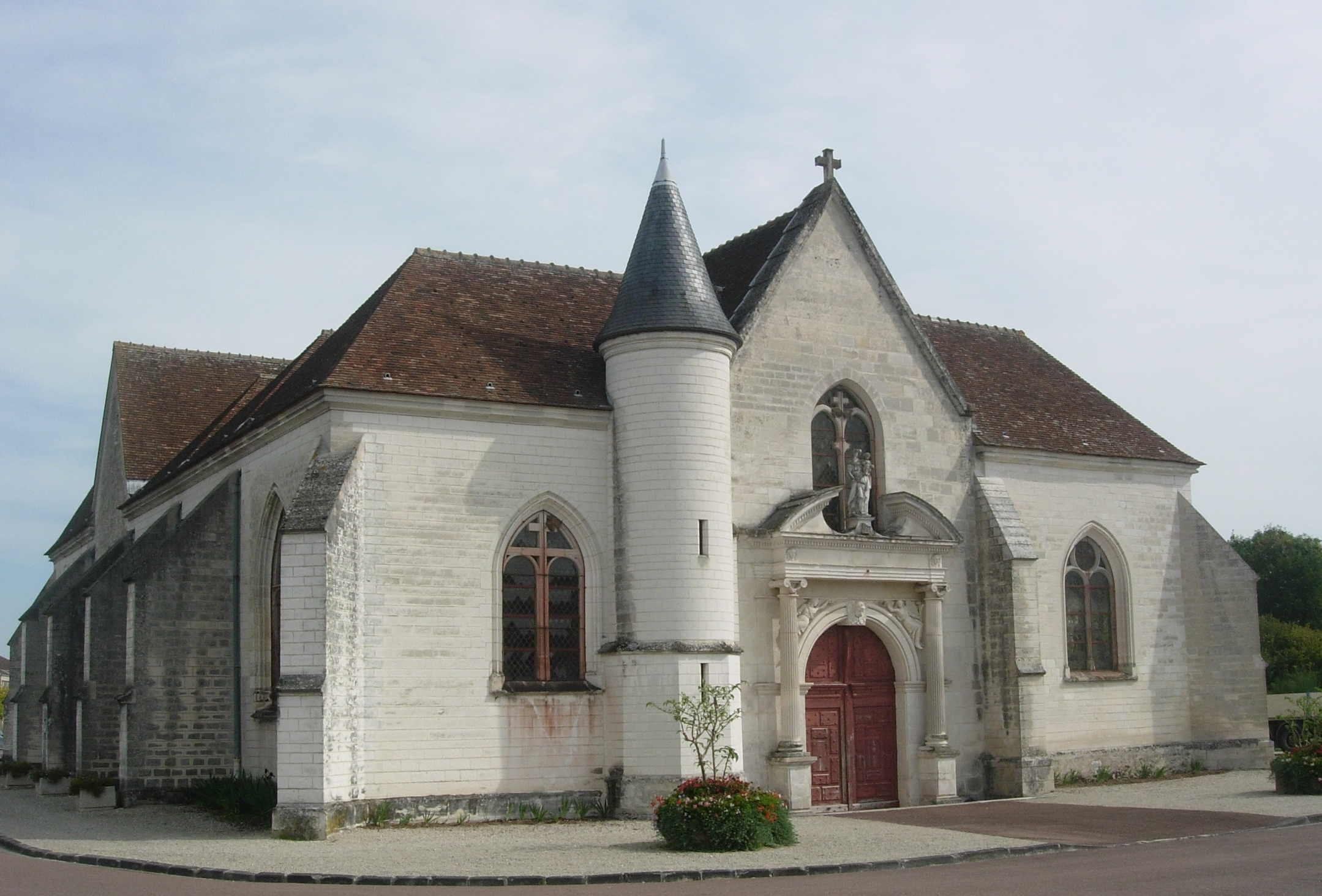
- The church in Les Noës-près-Troyes

- Coat of arms
- Location of Les Noës-près-Troyes
- Location within France Location within Grand Est
- Coordinates: 48°18′11″N 4°02′31″E
- Country: France
- Region: Grand Est
- Department: Aube
- Arrondissement: Troyes
- Canton: Troyes-2
- Intercommunality: CA Troyes Champagne Métropole

Government
  - Mayor (2024–2026): Philippe Lemoine
- Area^{1}: 0.7 km^{2} (0.27 sq mi)
- Elevation: 105 m (344 ft)
- Highest elevation: 110 m (360 ft)
- Lowest elevation: 107 m (351 ft)
- Population (2023): 3,261
  - Density: 4,700/km^{2} (12,000/sq mi)
- Time zone: UTC+01:00 (CET)
  - Summer (DST): UTC+02:00 (CEST)
- INSEE/Postal code: 10265 /10420
- ^{1} French Land Register data, which excludes lakes, ponds, glaciers > 1 km^{2} (0.386 sq mi or 247 acres) and river estuaries.

Les Noës-près-Troyes (French pronunciation: [le no pʁɛ tʁwa], literally 'Les Noës near Troyes') is a commune in the Aube department in north-central France.

== Population ==
Historical population
| Year | Pop. | ±% p.a. |
|---|---|---|
| 1968 | 1,244 | — |
| 1975 | 1,169 | −0.88% |
| 1982 | 3,678 | +17.79% |
| 1990 | 3,398 | −0.98% |
| 1999 | 3,466 | +0.22% |
| 2007 | 3,166 | −1.13% |
| 2012 | 3,159 | −0.04% |
| 2017 | 3,282 | +0.77% |
| 2023 | 3,261 | −0.11% |
Source: INSEE

== See also ==
- Communes of the Aube department
