= Droupt-Saint-Basle =

Commune in Grand Est, France

- Commune
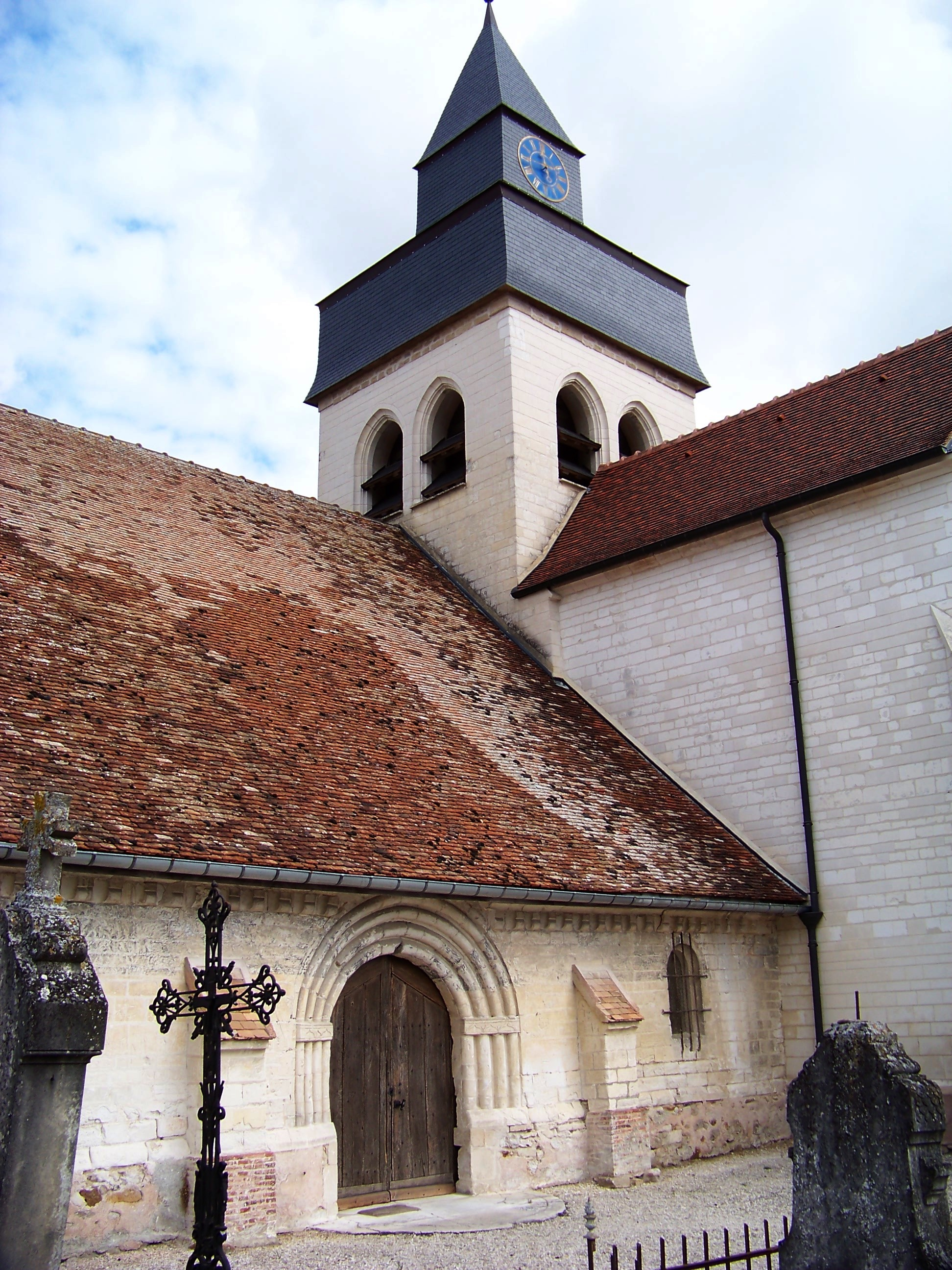
- The church in Droupt-Saint-Basle
- Location of Droupt-Saint-Basle
- Location within France Location within Grand Est
- Coordinates: 48°28′34″N 3°56′29″E
- Country: France
- Region: Grand Est
- Department: Aube
- Arrondissement: Nogent-sur-Seine
- Canton: Creney-près-Troyes

Government
  - Mayor (2020–2026): Denis Andry
- Area^{1}: 18.61 km^{2} (7.19 sq mi)
- Elevation: 89 m (292 ft)
- Population (2023): 339
  - Density: 18.2/km^{2} (47.2/sq mi)
- Time zone: UTC+01:00 (CET)
  - Summer (DST): UTC+02:00 (CEST)
- INSEE/Postal code: 10131 /10170
- ^{1} French Land Register data, which excludes lakes, ponds, glaciers > 1 km^{2} (0.386 sq mi or 247 acres) and river estuaries.

Droupt-Saint-Basle is a commune in the Aube department in north-central France.

== Population ==
Historical population
Year	Pop.	±% p.a.
1968	258	—
1975	219	−2.31%
1982	247	+1.73%
1990	288	+1.94%
1999	290	+0.08%
2007	308	+0.76%
2012	339	+1.94%
2017	355	+0.93%
2023	339	−0.77%
Source: INSEE

== Sights and monuments ==
- Château de Droupt-Saint-Basle, 16th century castle and château, added to the list of monuments historiques in 1987 and 1993.
- Church of Saint-Léonard-et-Saint-Basle de Droupt-Saint-Basle, originally 12th century, added to the list of monuments historiques in 1986
- Château du Ruez, 19th century mansion

== See also ==
- Communes of the Aube department
