= Canton of Troyes-1 =

Coordinates: 48°17′51″N 4°04′29″E

- Canton
- Situation of the canton of Troyes-1 in the department of Aube
- Country: France
- Region: Grand Est
- Department: Aube
- No. of communes: {{{nbcomm}}}
- Population (2023): 19,835
- INSEE code: 1012

The canton of Troyes-1 is a canton of the arrondissement of Troyes, in the Aube department, in northern France. Since the French canton reorganisation which came into effect in March 2015, the canton of Troyes-1 covers part of the commune of Troyes.
