= Cémoi =

French chocolate manufacturer

- Industry: Chocolate
- Founded: 1 June 1984
- Headquarters: Perpignan
- Website: cemoi.fr

Cémoi is a French chocolate manufacturer founded by Jules Pares in 1814 in Arles-sur-Tech, Pyrénées-Orientales. Cémoi is the biggest French chocolate manufacturer and the 26th in the world.

The Cémoi group owns 15 factories and 4 warehouses around the world.

== History ==
=== The origins ===
In 1814, Jules Pares founded one of the first French chocolate factories in Arles-sur-Tech, which eventually became Cémoi.

=== Development and diversification ===
In 1962, the businessman Georges Poirrier bought the company and changed its name to Cantalou. During the Trente glorieuses and with the development of the consumer society, the group changed its business model to produce mainly chocolate bars for supermarkets. It started to buy its competitors: Frankonia in 1977, Phoscao in 1979, Aiguebelle and Cémoi, whose name it took, in 1981.

In 2007, the group created Moreuil Distribution, bringing together the Arras and Mâcon warehouses, and acquired the Gryf factory in Poland, specialized in bean roasting and industrial products. In the same year, the Cémoi Group takes control of Troyes-based Jacquot.

In 2008, a new chocolate factory is inaugurated in Perpignan, on the so-called Torremilla site. It replaces the original site, which had become too cramped for production. In 2010, with production having been transferred to the new chocolate factory, the historic Perpignan d'Orle factory was refurbished as the company's headquarters, housing new laboratories for the R&D center (Cacao, Chocolat, Aromatique), as well as a boutique-museum.

Since 2012, the former Cémoi chocolate factory has been transformed into a boutique, the official retailer of Cémoi products. The site offers tours of the group's former factory, as well as detailed and explained product tasting.

In 2015, the Transparence Cacao Program was launched, with the aim of controlling the entire chocolate chain, from planter to consumer. As of 2026, 100g chocolate bars branded Tesco Finest, sold in at least the United Kingdom, carry the Transparence Cacao livery.

In 2017, the company acquired the American company Chris Candies (Pittsburg-Pennsylvania), specialized in production for supermarkets and wholesalers.

Groupe Cémoi, with sales of 750 million euros and 3,200 employees, is acquired in July 2021 by Belgian family group Sweet Products for around 500 million euros, or 10 times its 2020 Ebitda, according to Les Echos. Once combined, the company is expected to have 5,000 employees, sales of 1.2 billion euros and to become "the world leader in private label chocolates".

== Factory and warehouses ==
The Cémoi group owns 15 factories around the world:

- 9 factories in France
- 1 factory in Germany
- 1 factory in Wales
- 1 factory in Poland
- 1 factory in Ivory Coast

It also owns 4 warehouses:

- 3 warehouses in France
- 1 warehouse in Spain

== Cémoi Cocoa ==
Cémoi Cocoa comes from the following countries:

- Ivory Coast
- Ecuador
- São Tomé and Príncipe
- Vanuatu
