= Andouillette =

French sausage made of pork intestine

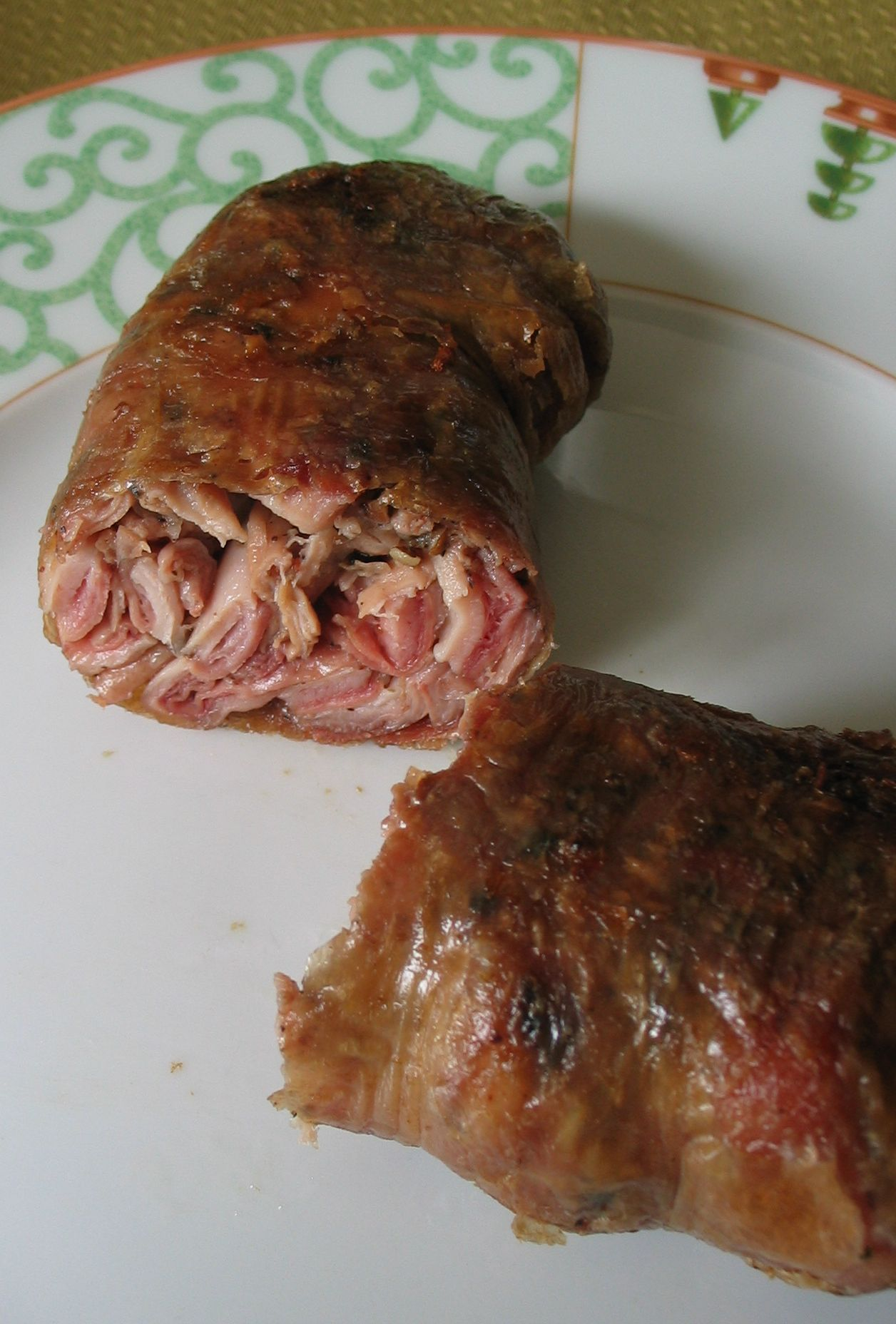
- Cooked andouillette cut in half
- Course: Sausage
- Place of origin: France

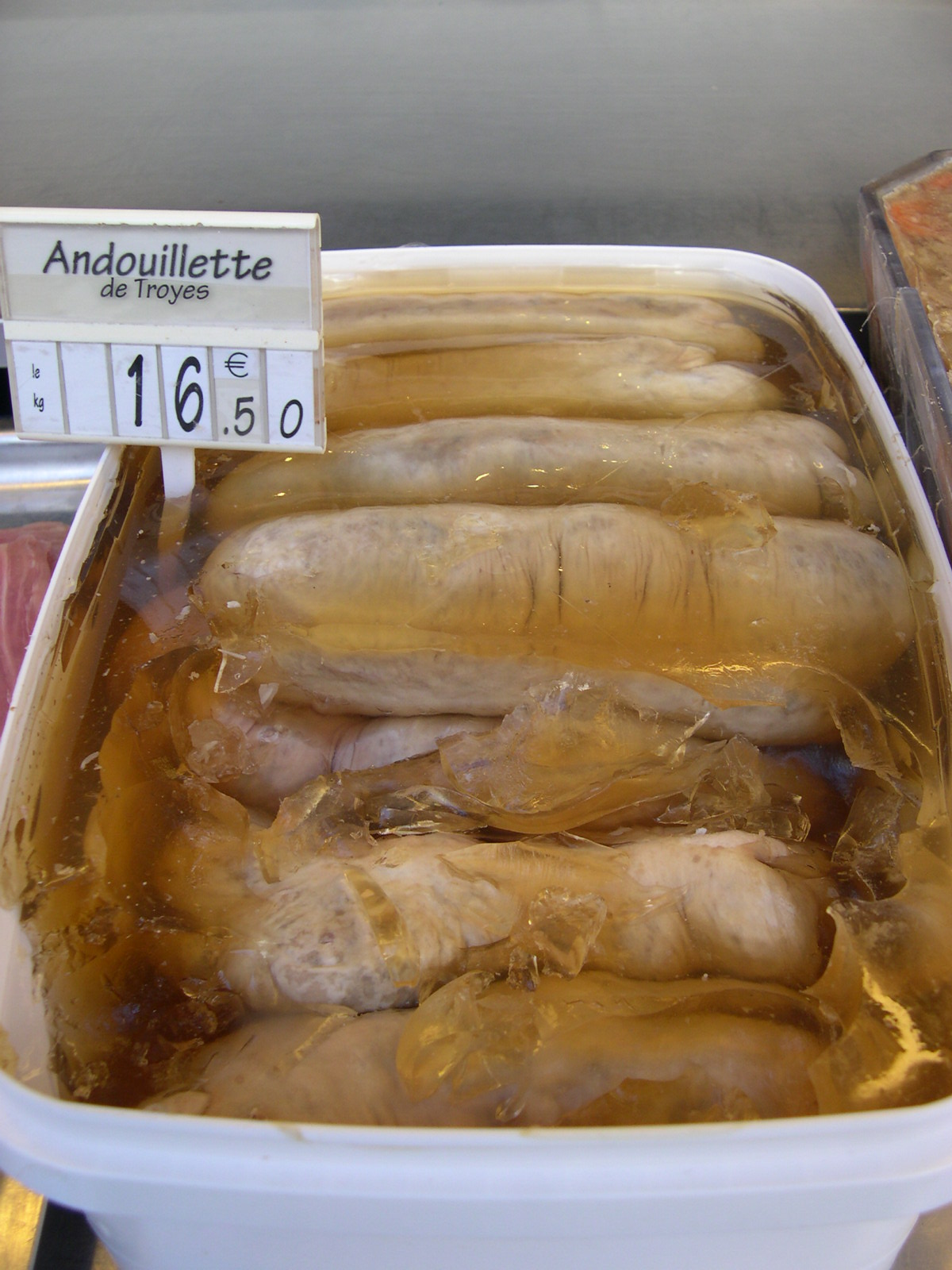
Andouillette in aspic from Troyes on sale at a charcuterie in Montmartre, Paris

Andouillette (French pronunciation: [ɑ̃dujɛt]) is a French coarse-grained sausage made from the intestine of pork, pepper, wine, onions, and seasonings.

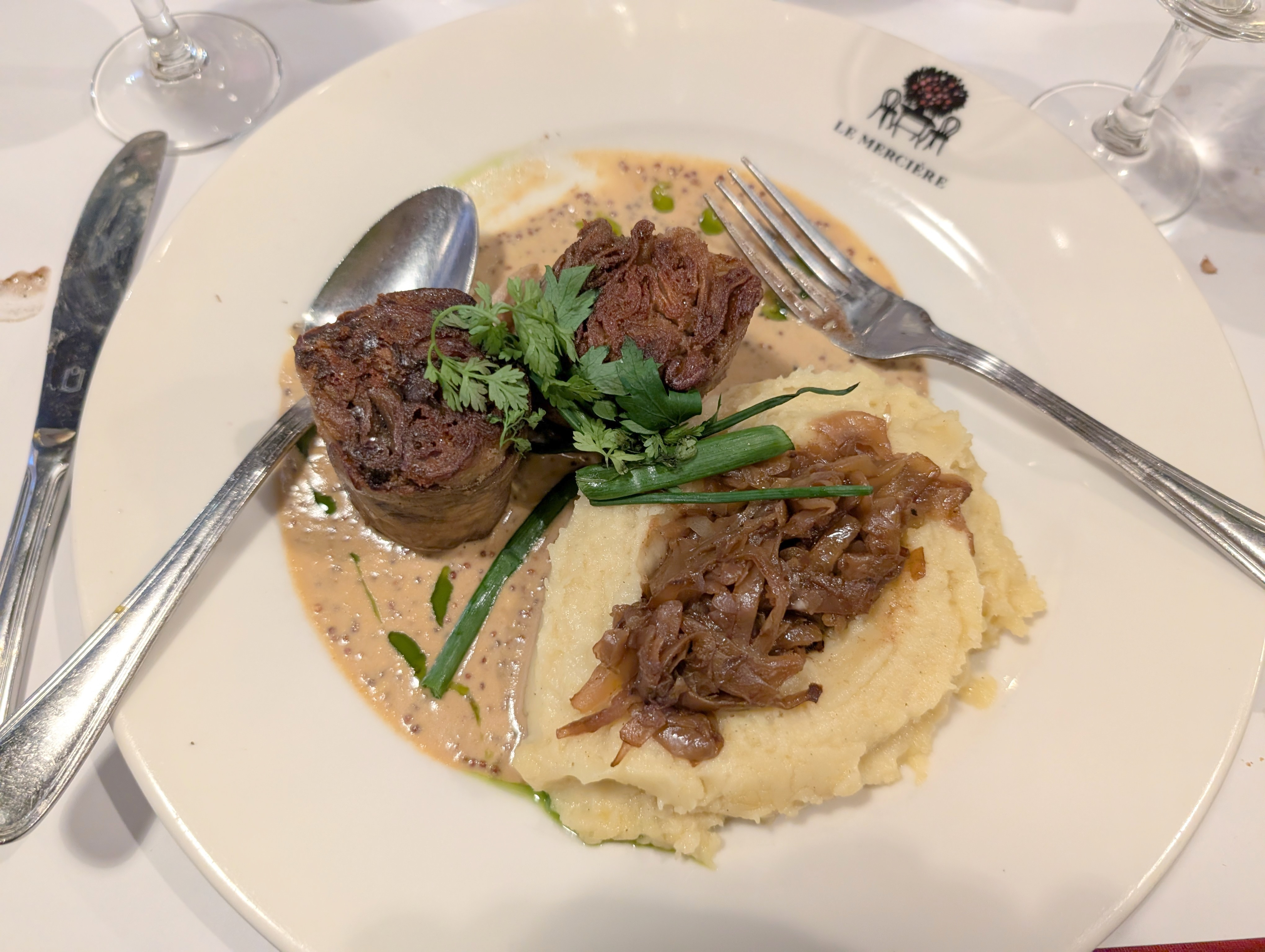
Andouillettes as served by Le Mercière, a traditional bouchon in Lyon

Andouillettes are generally made from the large intestine and are 7–10 cm (2 3/4–4 in) in diameter. True andouillettes are rarely seen outside France and have a strong, distinctive odour coming from the colon. Although sometimes repellent to the uninitiated (and the initiated), the scent is prized by its devotees which can also be said for the texture.

When made with the small intestine, they are a plump sausage generally about 25 mm (1 in) in diameter.

== Ingredients and history ==
The original composition of "andouillette sausages" is unknown and there is no record of the andouillette's composition from earlier than the nineteenth century. Nineteenth-century dictionaries simply describe them as "small andouilles" (petites andouilles).

During recent decades, a range of differently composed andouillettes have been offered by charcuterie producers; the principal differences concern the primary ingredients used, whether pork, veal, or a mixture of the two. During the twenty-first century the incorporation of veal, historically the more costly meat ingredient, has been banned in response to concerns over BSE. Some French regions, such as Cambrésis (the area surrounding Cambrai) and Lyonnais, were still including veal right up to the ban. In other regions, pork has been the only meat in an andouillette for more than a century; such is the case with the "andouillette of Troyes", which is currently the type of andouillette most likely to be encountered in national outlets, such as supermarkets, throughout France. However, it seems likely that throughout the nineteenth and twentieth centuries, local producers used their own unique recipes according to time and place; the recipes used by local specialised outlets still vary considerably.

A number of andouillettes sold as local specialities have nevertheless evolved or disappeared entirely, such as those of Villers-Cotterêts, which received a mention in the posthumously published Dictionary of Cuisine (Grand Dictionnaire de cuisine) by Alexandre Dumas.

In his 2021 memoir Taste: My Life Through Food, actor Stanley Tucci wrote humorously about ordering an andouillette with Meryl Streep in a small French restaurant. Neither could stomach the dish. Nonetheless, world-class restaurants such as St. John have been built on the foundation of properly prepared offal. Offal dishes are an important element of many culinary traditions, and by making use of animal parts that might otherwise be discarded, they could be said to contribute to sustainability in food and farming.

== Serving ==
Andouillettes can be served either hot or cold, with the former much more common. As with all lower intestine sausages, andouillettes are to some extent an acquired taste. Their smell may offend people, especially when the tripes are not cooked right away, or thoroughly cleaned. The texture is somewhat rougher than most sausages, as the content is coarsely cut. Properly done, they are braised long enough in water or stock to become very tender, then prepared for plating. The finished andouillettes can be pan-fried (sometimes breaded), it can also be served boiled, barbecued, or grilled, often with vegetables (primarily onions) in a mustard or red wine sauce.

== Popularity ==
Andouillette is a common dish all over France but some regions are well known for their own recipes. The most famous ones come from Troyes, Lyon, Cambrai and Chablis and are graded using the AAAAA (5 As) grading system.

== Clubs ==
The Association Amicale des Amateurs d'Andouillette Authentique (AAAAA) 'The Friendly Club of Lovers of Authentic Andouillette' is a club formed by several food writers in 1970. It gives certificates ("diplôme") to producers of high-quality andouillettes.

== See also ==
- Lyonnaise cuisine
- List of sausages
