= Cantons of the Aube department =

The following is a list of the 17 cantons of the Aube department, in France, following the French canton reorganisation which came into effect in March 2015:

- Aix-Villemaur-Pâlis
- Arcis-sur-Aube
- Bar-sur-Aube
- Bar-sur-Seine
- Brienne-le-Château
- Creney-près-Troyes
- Nogent-sur-Seine
- Les Riceys
- Romilly-sur-Seine
- Saint-André-les-Vergers
- Saint-Lyé
- Troyes-1
- Troyes-2
- Troyes-3
- Troyes-4
- Troyes-5
- Vendeuvre-sur-Barse
