= Aube =

Department of France

- Department
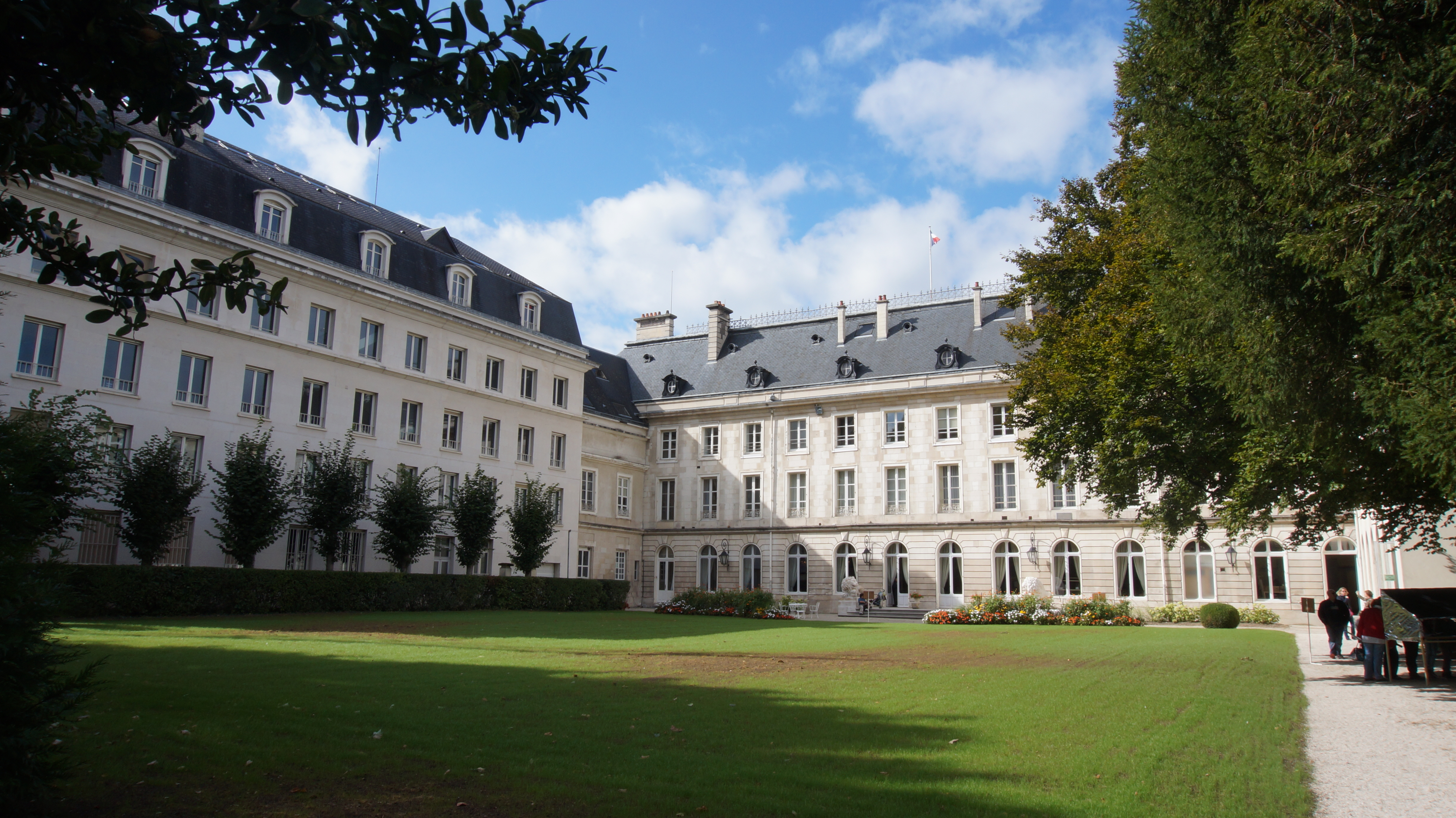
- Prefecture building of the Aube department in Troyes

- Flag Coat of arms

- Location of Aube in France
- Coordinates: 48°20′N 4°10′E
- Country: France
- Region: Grand Est
- Prefecture: Troyes
- Subprefectures: Bar-sur-Aube; Nogent-sur-Seine

Government
  - President of the Departmental Council: Philippe Pichery (DVD)

Area^{1}
  - Total: 6,004 km^{2} (2,318 sq mi)

Population (2023)
  - Total: 310,447
  - Rank: 73rd
  - Density: 51.71/km^{2} (133.9/sq mi)
- Time zone: UTC+1 (CET)
  - Summer (DST): UTC+2 (CEST)
- ISO 3166 code: FR-10
- Department number: 10
- Arrondissements: 3
- Cantons: 17
- Communes: 431
- ^1 French Land Register data, which excludes estuaries, and lakes, ponds, and glaciers larger than 1 km^{2}

Aube (French pronunciation: [ob] ohb) is a French department in the Grand Est region of northeastern France. As with sixty departments in France, this department is named after a river: the Aube. It has 310,447 inhabitants (2023). The inhabitants of the department are known as Aubois or Auboises.

The department was constituted by a decree of the National Assembly of 15 January 1790.

== Geography ==
=== Location ===
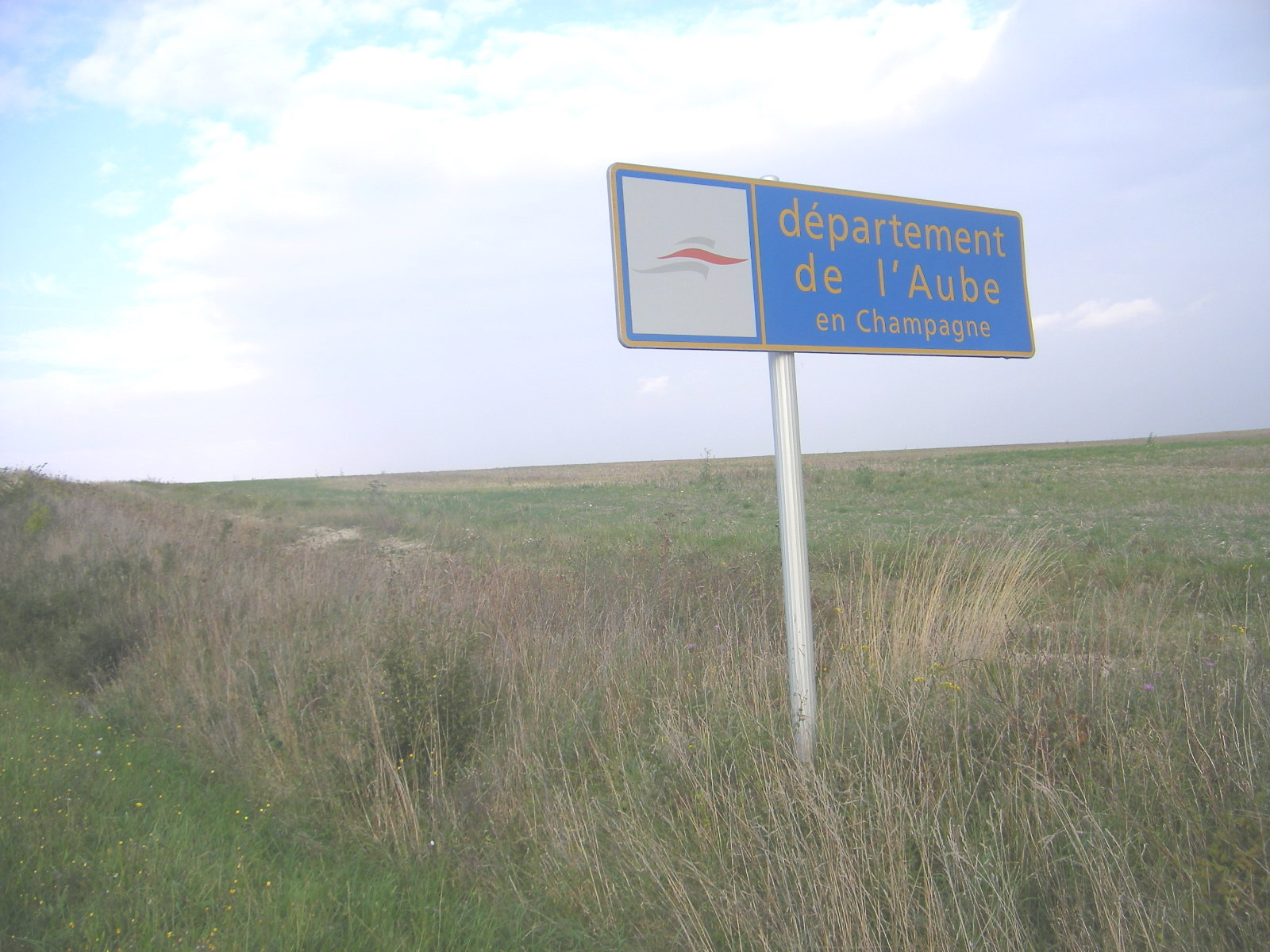
Entry to the Aube department from Route N77

The Aube department is located in the southwest side of the Grand Est region. It borders the departments of Marne in the north (about 130 km long), Haute-Marne to the east (about 100 km long), Côte-d'Or in the southeast (about 45 km long), Yonne in the southwest (about 175 km long), and Seine-et-Marne in the west (about 45 km long).

=== Subregions of Aube ===
Map of natural and traditional regions of the department.

Within the department regions of natural or traditional countryside can be identified as follows:

- northwest quarter: Champagne crayeuse (chalky Champagne soil)
- northwestern tip: the Nogentais
- southwest of Troyes: the Othe region
- to the south: le Chaourçois
- to the northeast: the Briennois
- to the east: the Barrois
- between Troyes and Barrois: Champagne wetlands

=== Communes of Aube ===
Aube is divided into 431 communes. The most populous commune is the prefecture Troyes. As of 2023, there are 8 communes with more than 5,000 inhabitants:

| Commune | Population (2023) |
|---|---|
| Troyes | 62,088 |
| Romilly-sur-Seine | 14,959 |
| Saint-André-les-Vergers | 12,806 |
| La Chapelle-Saint-Luc | 12,648 |
| Sainte-Savine | 10,289 |
| Saint-Julien-les-Villas | 6,760 |
| Nogent-sur-Seine | 5,537 |
| Pont-Sainte-Marie | 5,249 |

All of those communes, except Romilly-sur-Seine and Nogent-sur-Seine, are part of the agglomeration of Troyes.

=== Topography and geology ===
Altitude of the main towns of Aube
| | Troyes | Romilly-sur-Seine | Bar-sur-Aube | Nogent-sur-Seine |
|---|---|---|---|---|
| Lowest Altitude | 100 metres | 67 metres | 156 metres | 60 metres |
| Highest Altitude | 126 metres | 112 metres | 348 metres | 113 metres |
| Average Altitude | 113 metres | 90 metres | 252 metres | 87 metres |
| Town Hall Altitude | 107 metres | 77 metres | 165 metres | 71 metres |

=== Hydrography ===
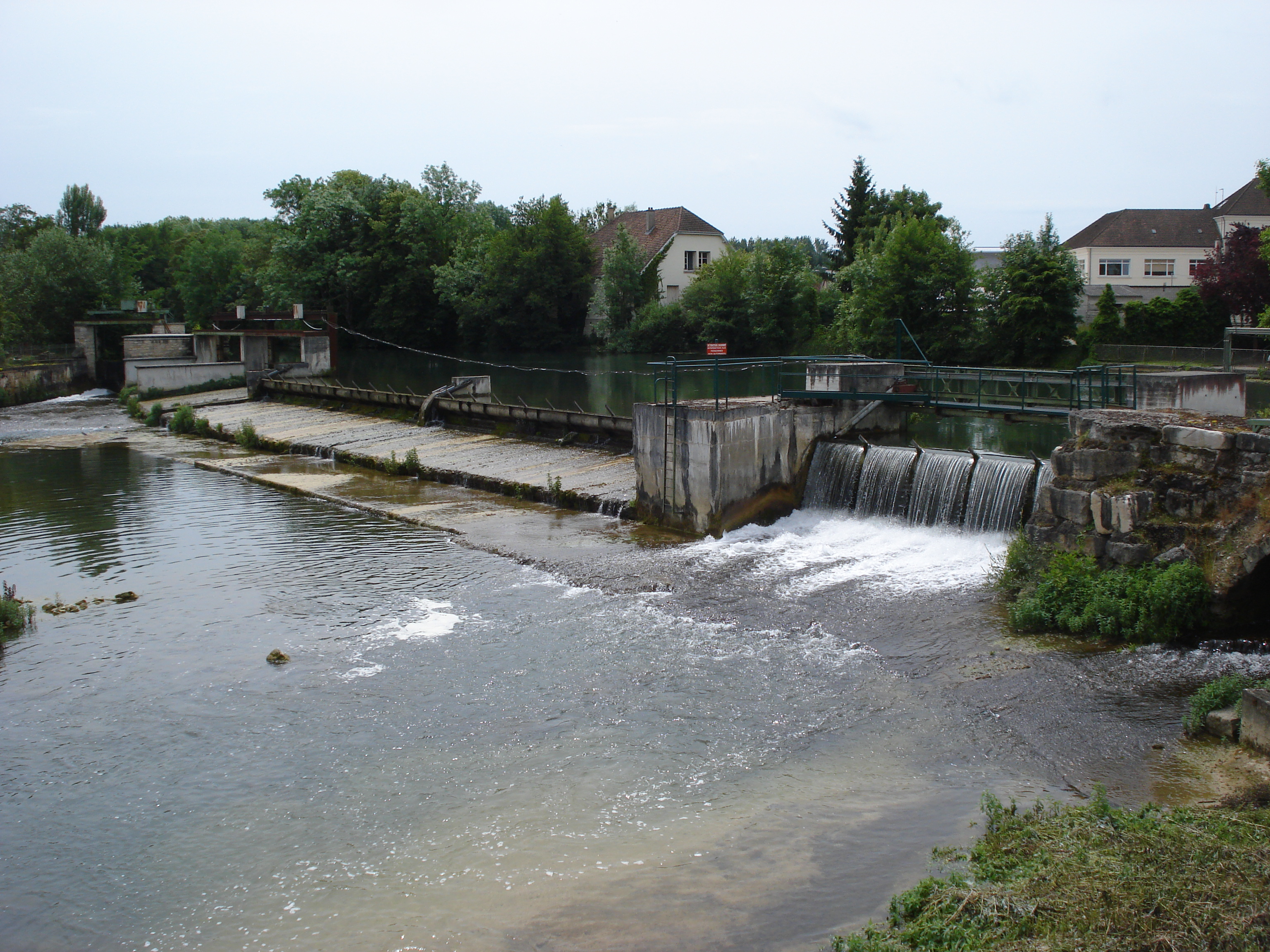
The Seine at Bar-sur-Seine

There are 23 rivers throughout the department, (Note: The complete list can be found at Water Courses of Aube (in French)) the four main rivers being the Seine, the Aube (tributary of the Seine), the Armance (tributary of the Armançon), and the Vanne (a tributary of the Yonne).

=== Forests and lakes ===
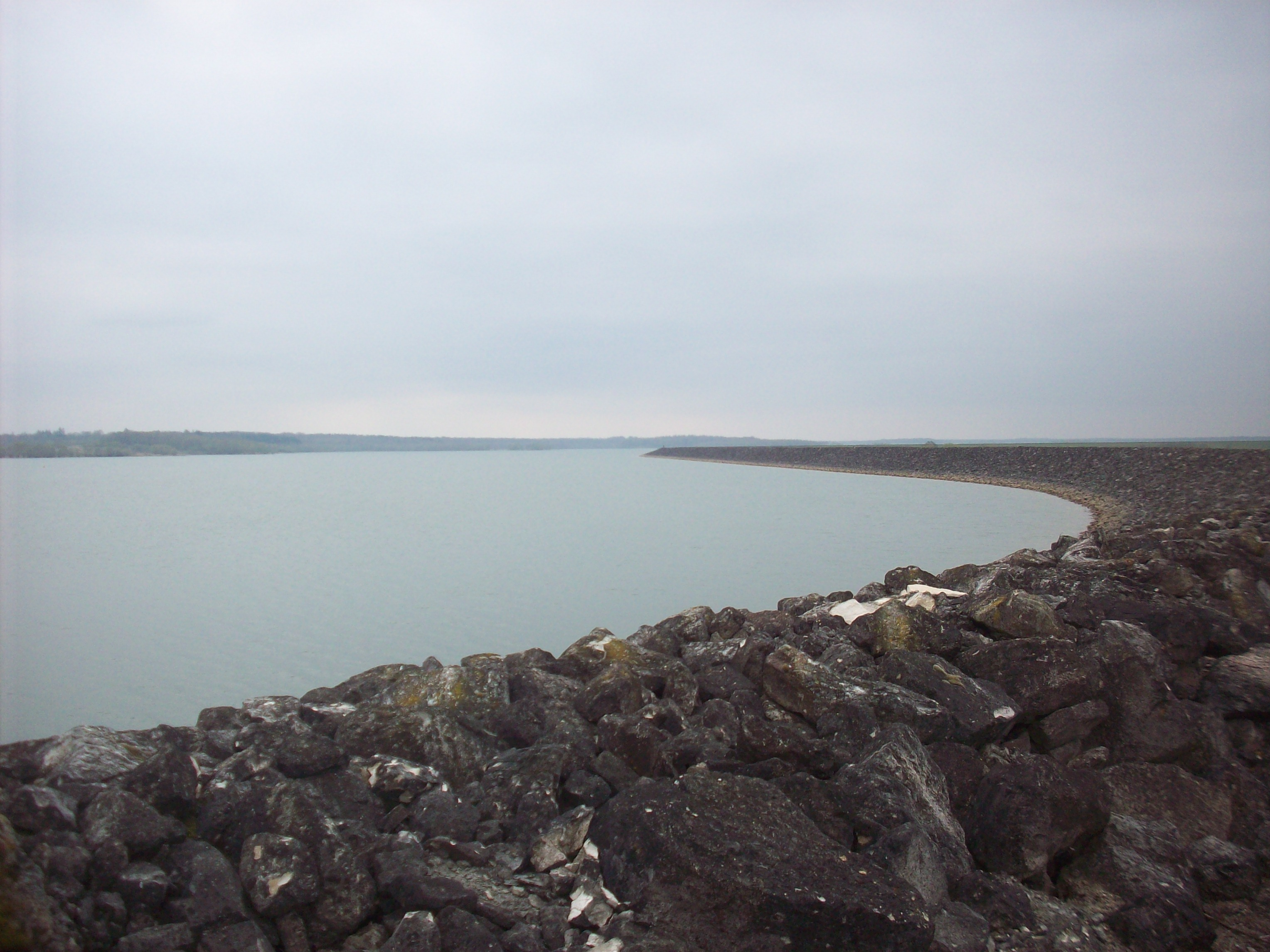
Temple Lake seen from the dam

The department has 140,000 hectares of forests.

Located in the Community of communes of Forests, lakes, and lands in Champagne, the Orient Forest Regional Natural Park was one of the first natural parks created in France.

In the same place, there is the Orient Lake and the Amance and Temple lakes where fishing, recreational water sports, and bathing are available. Each lake specialises in one or more of these activities.

=== Climate ===
The climate is moderate without intense cold or excessive heat which represents a climate similar to continental and oceanic.

Between 1950 and 1985 the average annual temperature recorded in the department was 10.1 °C which is equivalent to the Paris basin and the cities of north-eastern France. The average sunshine hours per year is 1771.

Average annual rainfall is quite high (653.4 mm over 115 days of rain). In general there is more rain in autumn than in winter but rainfall is highest during spring. In contrast summer is the season when rainfall is lowest. There is, however, more rain in the south-east than the north-west.

Snow is relatively infrequent. Prevailing wind is from the west.

Comparison of local Meteorological data with other cities in France
| Town | Sunshine (hours/yr) | Rain (mm/yr) | Snow (days/yr) | Storm (days/yr) | Fog (days/yr) |
|---|---|---|---|---|---|
| National average | 1,973 | 770 | 14 | 22 | 40 |
| Troyes | 1,817 | 645 | 15 | 17 | 38 |
| Paris | 1,661 | 637 | 12 | 18 | 10 |
| Nice | 2,724 | 767 | 1 | 29 | 1 |
| Strasbourg | 1,693 | 665 | 29 | 29 | 56 |
| Brest | 1,605 | 1,211 | 7 | 12 | 75 |

Climate data for Troyes
| Month | Jan | Feb | Mar | Apr | May | Jun | Jul | Aug | Sep | Oct | Nov | Dec | Year |
|---|---|---|---|---|---|---|---|---|---|---|---|---|---|
| Mean daily maximum °C (°F) | 6.2 (43.2) | 7.7 (45.9) | 11.9 (53.4) | 15.2 (59.4) | 19.5 (67.1) | 22.7 (72.9) | 25.7 (78.3) | 25.4 (77.7) | 21.2 (70.2) | 16.3 (61.3) | 10.1 (50.2) | 6.7 (44.1) | 15.7 (60.3) |
| Daily mean °C (°F) | 3.1 (37.6) | 3.7 (38.7) | 7.0 (44.6) | 9.5 (49.1) | 13.7 (56.7) | 16.7 (62.1) | 19.3 (66.7) | 19.0 (66.2) | 15.4 (59.7) | 11.6 (52.9) | 6.6 (43.9) | 3.8 (38.8) | 10.8 (51.4) |
| Mean daily minimum °C (°F) | −0.1 (31.8) | −0.3 (31.5) | 2.0 (35.6) | 3.7 (38.7) | 7.8 (46.0) | 10.7 (51.3) | 12.8 (55.0) | 12.6 (54.7) | 9.6 (49.3) | 6.8 (44.2) | 3.0 (37.4) | 0.8 (33.4) | 5.8 (42.4) |
| Average precipitation mm (inches) | 50.5 (1.99) | 42.1 (1.66) | 47.7 (1.88) | 50.9 (2.00) | 61.7 (2.43) | 56.6 (2.23) | 54.4 (2.14) | 52.2 (2.06) | 53.3 (2.10) | 63.6 (2.50) | 51.2 (2.02) | 60.6 (2.39) | 644.8 (25.39) |
| Average precipitation days (≥ 1 mm) | 10.0 | 8.4 | 10.3 | 9.1 | 10.1 | 8.6 | 7.2 | 7.0 | 7.5 | 9.6 | 9.8 | 10.6 | 108.2 |
| Mean monthly sunshine hours | 69 | 88 | 144 | 185 | 215 | 229 | 235 | 228 | 179 | 124 | 67 | 54 | 1,817 |
Source: Meteorological data for Troyes – 112 m altitude, from 1981 to 2010 January 2015 (in French)

=== Channels of communication and transport ===
==== Road network ====
The department has 150 km of autoroutes, 33 km of national roads, 4,517 km of departmental roads and 2,116 km of local roads.

==== Communal transport ====
In the Agglomeration of Troyes TCAT (Transport for the Communes of Troyes) provides a transport network between communes. Unlike many networks that are provided by other operators, the agglomeration community of the city is the owner of the company. The network currently serves eleven communes including two outside the Troyes agglomeration. Other cities, including Romilly-sur-Seine, have no transport network.

Aube also has intercity transport networks. 21 regular bus routes are operated between the major cities of the department. The use of these lines is entrusted to private coaches: Transdev – The Carriers of Aube has 15 routes, Keolis Sud Lorraine has 4 routes, Procars Champagne has 2 routes, Autocars Bardy has one route.

==== Rail network ====
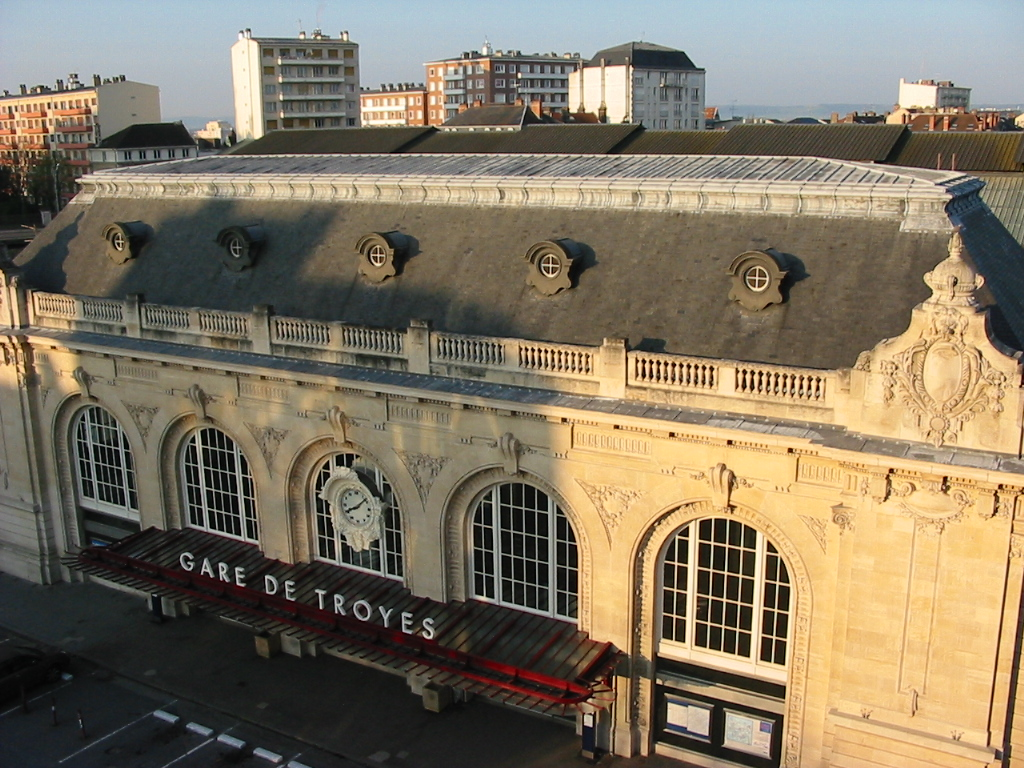
Troyes Station

Five railway stations are currently in operation. These are: Nogent-sur-Seine, Romilly-sur-Seine, Troyes, Vendeuvre-sur-Barse, Bar-sur-Aube.

Aube does not have a strong rail coverage. Only one main non-electrified line passes through Aube – the line that connects Paris-Est to Mulhouse.

==== Navigable waterways ====
The department has 34.8 km of navigable waterways. The city of Nogent-sur-Seine has two river ports for grain.

== History ==
=== Early history ===
The first inhabitants of Aube were the Tricasses and Lingones with a substantial human settlement around the year 400 BC.

Saints Potentian and Savinian, Greek priests from Samos, came to preach the gospel from the middle of the 3rd century. Saint Patroclus was one of the first martyrs of the new faith in the year 259. Shortly after Saint Jule and some notables of the city of Tricasses also suffered martyrdom. Nevertheless, as elsewhere, the Christian community became large enough to accommodate a bishop. Saint Amateur was the first in 340. In the year 286 the Bagaudae ravaged the land which forms Aube. Emperor Julian came to Troyes with his army and rescued it.

The territory making up Aube was first attached to France in 843, following the Treaty of Verdun.

=== The 12th century and the monasteries ===
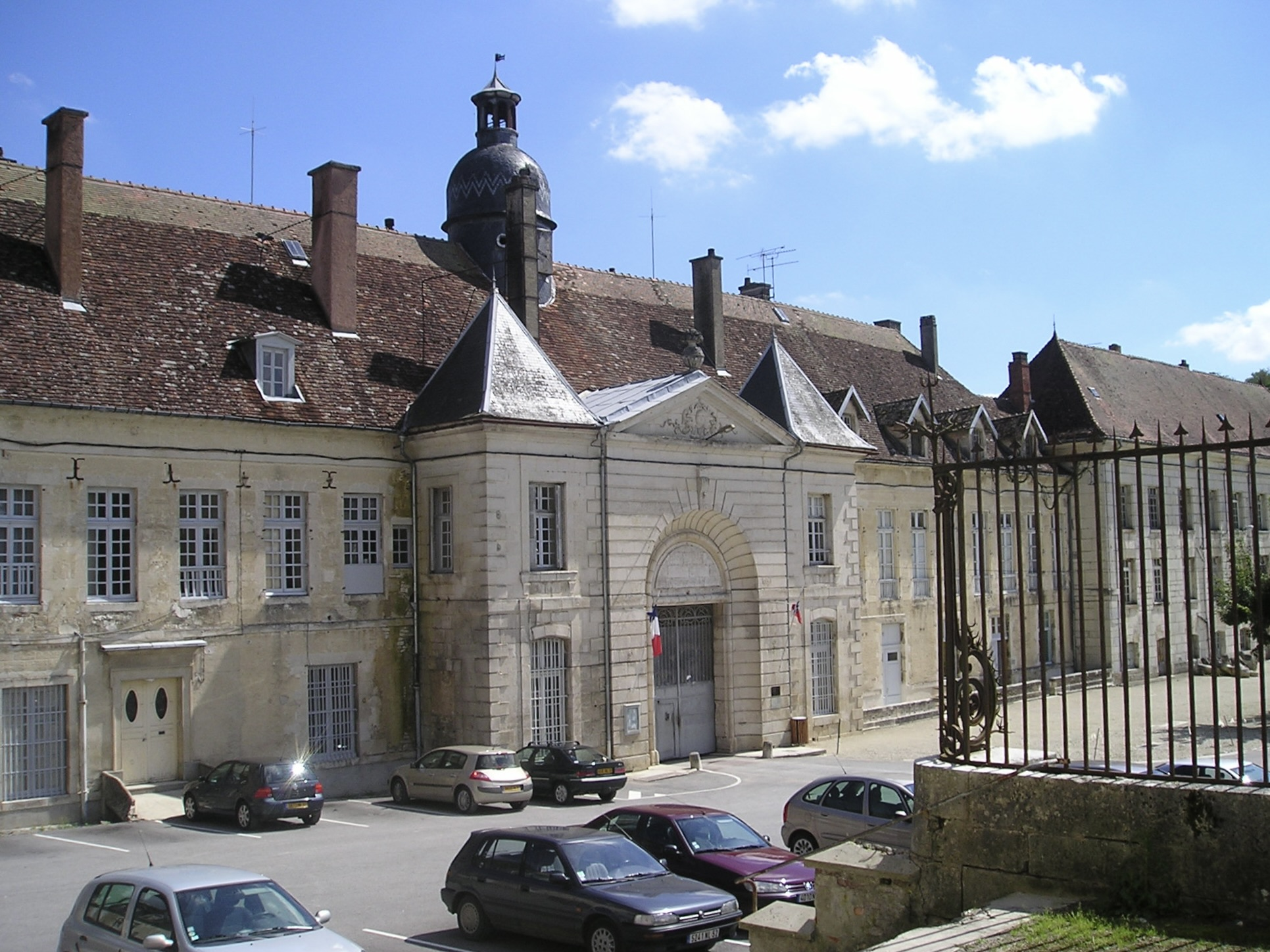
The Abbey of Clairvaux: today a prison

Two important monasteries were founded in the department: one at Clairvaux in 1114, created by Bernard of Clairvaux, the other was the Abbey of the Paraclete near Nogent-sur-Seine, by his illustrious rival, Pierre Abélard and of which Héloïse d'Argenteuil was the first abbess. Bernard of Clairvaux was noted for his eloquence at the Council of Troyes and his preaching of the Second Crusade which had no result and whose outcome was disastrous.

The reunion of Champagne with the kingdom of France was finalised in 1361. Yet people wanted absolutely the incorporation of Champagne but in 1328 King Philip VI gave the city of Bar-sur-Seine to Philippe de Croy. The inhabitants, however, ransomed him to return it to the king on the condition that it become inalienable.

=== Definitive reunion with Kingdom of France ===
Aube in 1790

The decree of the National Assembly of 15 January 1790 formally established the department of Aube. Its first president was Augustin-Henri-Marie Picot and his first deputy was Louis Antoine Joseph Robin. Jacques Claude Beugnot was elected attorney-general and also MP.

After the victory of the allies in the battle of Waterloo on 18 June 1815, the department was occupied by Russian troops from June 1815 to November 1818.

In 1911, following the revolt of the vineyards of Champagne, large riots broke out in the department.

In 1919, a decree allowed Aube department to produce champagne for the first time.

In 1932, Turkish president Mustafa Kemal Atatürk visited Aube and signed a friendship treaty with France there on 4 July 1938.

=== Heraldry ===
| Arms of Aube | Blazon: Azure, a band argent with two cotises potent and counter potent in Or, chief wavy in argent. |

== Politics and administration ==
=== Departmental council ===
The departmental council of Aube is located in Troyes. Its president is Philippe Pichery (Miscellaneous right). It includes the 34 councillors of the 17 cantons of Aube. Of these, 32 are from the Right (mainly the UMP), the others are from the Miscellaneous left.

Aube returns three Deputies to the National Assembly, two of whom are from The Republicans (LR), and two Senators: one UMP and one right-wing independent.

=== Presidential elections 2nd round ===
| Election | Winning candidate | Party | % | 2nd place candidate | Party | % |
|---|---|---|---|---|---|---|
| 2022 | Emmanuel Macron | LREM | 48.32 | Marine Le Pen | RN | 51.68 |
| 2017 | Emmanuel Macron | LREM | 54.15 | Marine Le Pen | FN | 45.85 |
| 2012 | Nicolas Sarkozy | UMP | 57.37 | François Hollande | PS | 42.63 |
| 2007 | Nicolas Sarkozy | UMP | 61.70 | Ségolène Royal | PS | 38.30 |
| 2002 | Jacques Chirac | RPR | 76.87 | Jean-Marie Le Pen | FN | 23.13 |
| 1995 | Jacques Chirac | RPR | 55.30 | Lionel Jospin | PS | 44.70 |

=== Current National Assembly Representatives ===
| Constituency | Member | Party |
|---|---|---|
| Aube's 1st constituency | Jordan Guitton | National Rally |
| Aube's 2nd constituency | Valérie Bazin-Malgras | The Republicans |
| Aube's 3rd constituency | Angélique Ranc | National Rally |

Seats in the Departmental Council by Political Party
| Party | Abbrev. | No. Members |
|---|---|---|
Left Wing
| Socialist Party | PS | 2 |
| Communist Party | PCF | 2 |
| Miscellaneous left | DVG | 1 |
| Europe Ecology – The Greens | EELV | 1 |
Right Wing
| Democratic Movement | MoDem | 1 |
| New Centre | NC | 2 |
| Miscellaneous right | DVD | 10 |
| Union for a Popular Movement | UMP | 13 |
Independent
| Independent | SE | 1 |
President of the General Council

== Demography ==
Aube is inhabited by 311,000 people with 45% (140,000 inhabitants) living in the Troyes agglomeration (2022).

=== Demographic change ===
Historical population

| Year | Pop. | ±% p.a. |
|---|---|---|
| 1793 | 228,885 | — |
| 1800 | 231,455 | +0.16% |
| 1806 | 238,819 | +0.52% |
| 1821 | 230,688 | −0.23% |
| 1831 | 246,361 | +0.66% |
| 1836 | 253,870 | +0.60% |
| 1841 | 258,180 | +0.34% |
| 1846 | 261,881 | +0.29% |
| 1851 | 265,247 | +0.26% |
| 1856 | 261,673 | −0.27% |
| 1861 | 262,785 | +0.08% |
| 1866 | 261,951 | −0.06% |
| 1872 | 255,687 | −0.40% |
| 1876 | 255,217 | −0.05% |
| 1881 | 255,326 | +0.01% |
| 1886 | 257,374 | +0.16% |
| 1891 | 255,548 | −0.14% |
| 1896 | 251,435 | −0.32% |
| 1901 | 246,163 | −0.42% |

| Year | Pop. | ±% p.a. |
|---|---|---|
| 1906 | 243,670 | −0.20% |
| 1911 | 241,036 | −0.22% |
| 1921 | 227,839 | −0.56% |
| 1926 | 238,253 | +0.90% |
| 1931 | 242,596 | +0.36% |
| 1936 | 239,563 | −0.25% |
| 1946 | 235,237 | −0.18% |
| 1954 | 240,797 | +0.29% |
| 1962 | 255,099 | +0.72% |
| 1968 | 270,325 | +0.97% |
| 1975 | 284,823 | +0.75% |
| 1982 | 289,300 | +0.22% |
| 1990 | 289,207 | −0.00% |
| 1999 | 292,131 | +0.11% |
| 2007 | 300,840 | +0.37% |
| 2012 | 305,606 | +0.31% |
| 2017 | 310,020 | +0.29% |
| 2023 | 310,447 | +0.02% |

Source: SPLAF and INSEE

=== Distribution of age groups ===
Population by age of Aube, 2023 (%)

| 80+ | 6.6 |
| 65–79 | 16.3 |
| 55–64 | 12.7 |
| 40–54 | 18.5 |
| 25–39 | 16.7 |
| 15–24 | 11.8 |
| 0–14 | 17.3 |

Total: 99.9

| male |

| female |

Source: INSEE

Population by age of France, 2023 (%)

| 90+ | 6 |
| 75–89 | 15 |
| 60–74 | 12.8 |
| 45–59 | 19.3 |
| 30–44 | 17.9 |
| 15–29 | 11.9 |
| 0–14 | 17 |

Total: 99.9

| male |

| female |

Source: INSEE

=== Breakdown of population by socio-professional categories ===
Population of 15 years or more by sex, age, and socio-professional category
| socio-professionnel category | 2017 | | 2007 | | 1999 | |
| socio-professionnel category | Nb | % | Nb | % | Nb | % |
|---|---|---|---|---|---|---|
| Total | 253,551 | | 246,346 | | 236,393 | |
| Farmers and Farm workers | 4,319 | 1.7 | 5,094 | 2.1 | 5,408 | 2.3 |
| Artisans, shopkeepers, business managers | 7,701 | 3.0 | 7,232 | 2.9 | 7,619 | 3.2 |
| Executives and Intellectuals | 13,896 | 5.5 | 12,656 | 5.1 | 9,435 | 4.0 |
| Intermediate Professions | 30,540 | 12.0 | 28,805 | 11.7 | 24,953 | 10.6 |
| Employees | 41,091 | 16.2 | 40,276 | 16.3 | 35,303 | 14.9 |
| Workers | 38,672 | 15.3 | 43,950 | 17.8 | 47,771 | 20.2 |
| Retirees | 75,918 | 29.9 | 68,138 | 27.7 | 58,706 | 24.8 |
| Others without occupation | 41,414 | 16.3 | 40,194 | 16.3 | 47,198 | 20.0 |
Source : INSEE Census 2017

== Economy ==
=== General ===
The economy of Aube has focused on the textile industry since the 19th century. This sector is now in crisis due to the department being in an area of real economic change.

In 2017, the departmental workforce totalled 137,774 with 114,530 persons in employment and 23,244 people unemployed. Men accounted for 51.4% of the active population and women 48.6%.

The Aube department has a high rate of feminization in employment. Nearly half of people with active jobs (48.1% in 2017) are women. The main areas affected by the feminization are trade, transport, textiles, utilities, education, and health. Women are slightly more affected than men by unemployment (51.3% of the unemployed in 2017). This is mainly due to layoffs in the textile sector.

=== Employment by sector ===
Distribution of Employment by Industry sector (2015)

| | Agriculture | Industry | Construction | Commerce (Note: Including transport and services) | Public Administration (Note: Including education, health, and social workers) |
|---|---|---|---|---|---|
| Aube | 3.4% | 17.9% | 6.7% | 39.6% | 32.4% |
Source: INSEE

=== Main economic sectors ===
==== Industry ====
Large Industrial Companies
| | No. of Employees |
| Petit Bateau (Textiles) | 1,022 |
| Devanlay (Textiles) | 1,018 |
| Soufflet (Cereals) | 874 |
| Kléber (Pneumatics) | 790 |
| Vachette (Locks) | 600 |
| Mefro Roues (Wheel rims) | 584 |
| Valco (Furniture) | 575 |
| Petitjean (Public lighting) | 567 |
| Jacquot (Chocolate) | 550 |

==== Tourism ====
Accommodations
| | No. Establishments | |
| Hotels | 66 | 1,991 rooms |
| Camping | 23 | 1,618 places |
| Holiday Cottages | 310 | 2,006 places |

==== Agriculture ====
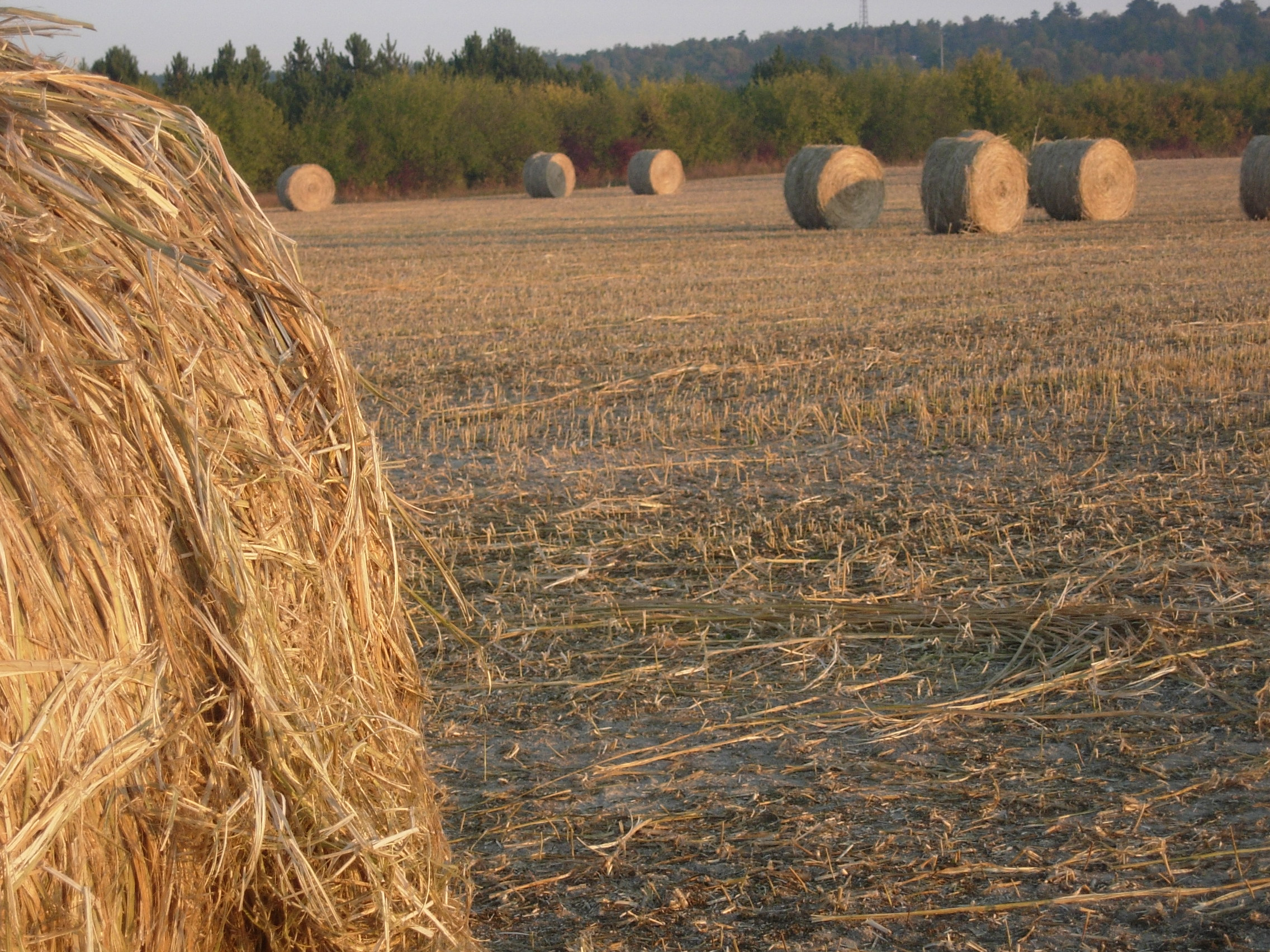
Harvesting hemp at Saint-Flavy

The utilized agricultural area is 379,720 hectares. Aube is the largest producer of hemp; the 2nd largest producer of champagne, cabbage for sauerkraut, medicinal poppies, and alfalfa; the 6th largest producer of potatoes; the 8th largest producer of cereals; and the 9th largest producer of beet in France.

== Population and society ==
=== Education ===
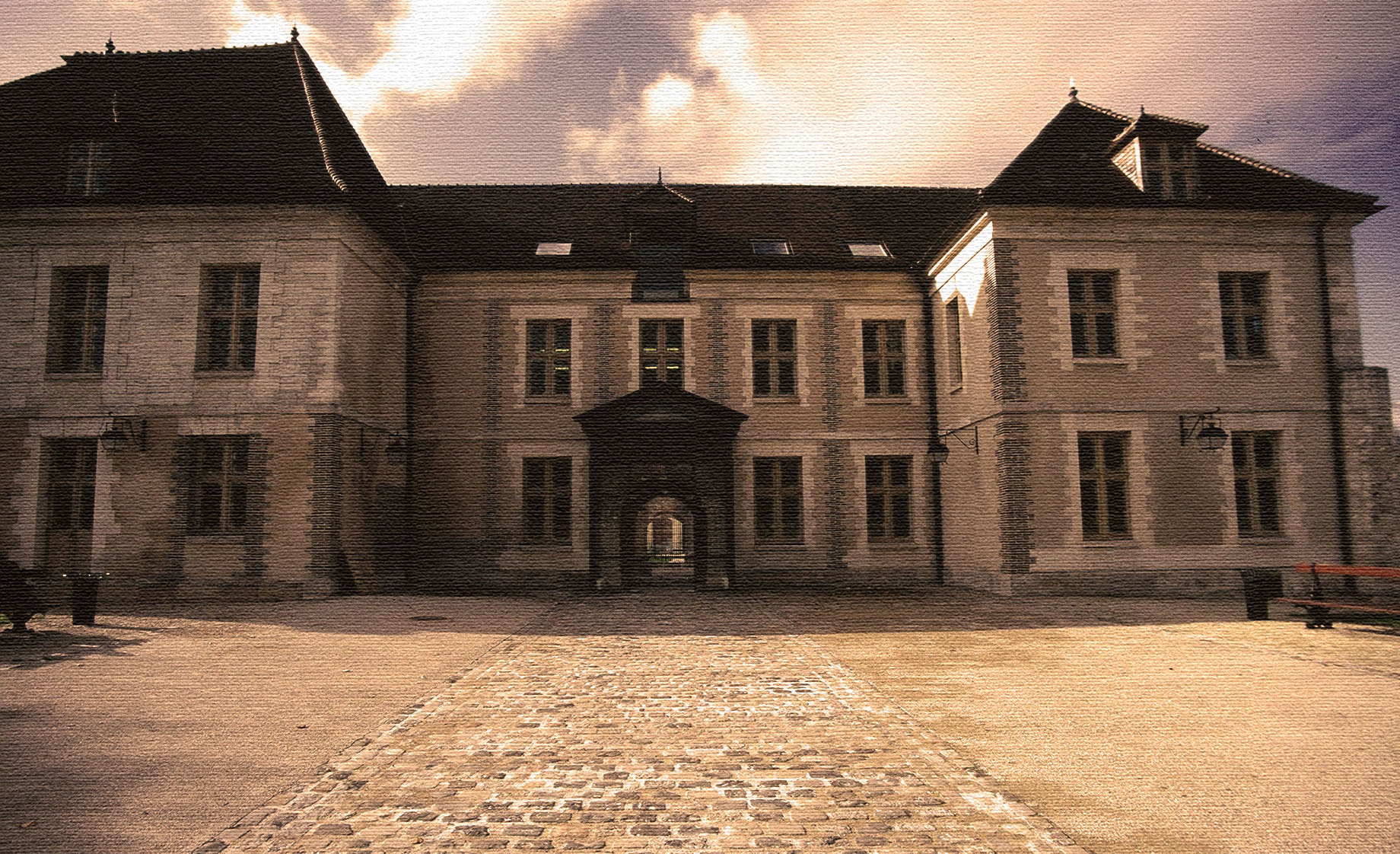
An old school at Troyes

==== Primary and secondary ====
In 2010 elementary and secondary education consisted of:

- 11,568 students in kindergarten across 136 schools (including 1 private);
- 18,465 students in primary school across 255 schools (including 14 private);
- 12,311 students in college across 34 institutions (including 9 private);
- 5,199 students in schools of general education across 10 institutions (including 3 private);
- 2,666 students in vocational high school across 10 institutions (including 3 private).

==== Higher education ====
According to the latest census of the academic inspectorate of Aube in 2009 the department has 8,794 students in higher education. (Note: This figure does not take into account students from the National Conservatory of Music in Troyes)

List of Universities and Higher Educational Schools

Public Schools

- University of Technology of Troyes (UTT)
- Institute of Technology of Troyes (University of Reims Champagne-Ardenne)
- Faculty (University of Reims Champagne-Ardenne)
- Institute for Heritage Skills (IUMP)
- Institute for Teacher Training (IUFM)
- Institute for Nursing Education (IFSI of Troyes/DE IDE)
- Preparatory classes for Higher Education (CPGE) scientific and economic
- Graduate School for Applied Arts in Troyes
- National Conservatory of Music in Troyes

Private Schools

- Graduate School of Commerce in Troyes
- Supinfo

=== Health ===
List of Hospitals and Health Clinics

Hospitals and Clinics
| Type of Institution | No. of Institutions |
|---|---|
| Hospital | 4 |
| Clinic | 7 |

Children's Institutions
| Type of Institution | No. of Institutions |
|---|---|
| Child Protection | 12 |
| Handicapped Children's Centre | 18 |

Institutions for Handicapped Adults
| Type of Institution | No. of Institutions |
|---|---|
| Institution to help for work | 8 |
| Businesses adapted for handicapped people | 2 |
| Professional rehabilitation Centres | 1 |
| Specialised Foster Homes | 2 |
| Accommodation Facilities | 20 |
| Residential Home Care for the autistic | 2 |
| Home Care | 2 |

Institutions for the Elderly
| Type of Institution | No. of Institutions |
|---|---|
| Nursing Homes for the Elderly (EHPAD) | 38 |
| Home Housing | 10 |
| Long Term Care Units (USLD) | 5 |
| Group Homes | 1 |
| Home Care | 7 |
| Rural Homes for the Elderly | 1 |

=== Sports ===
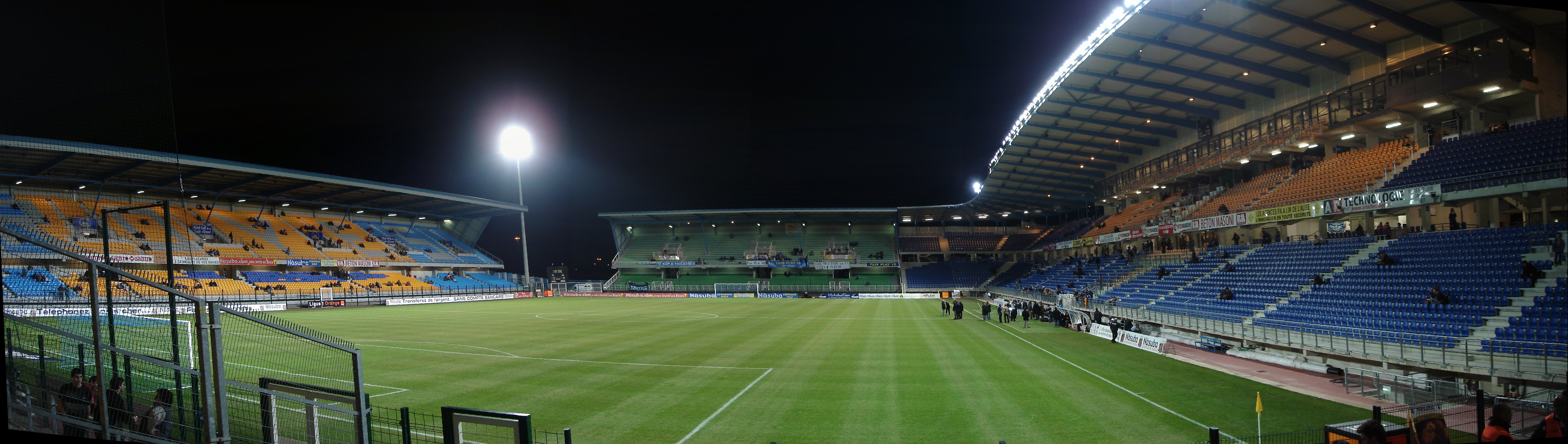
The Aube Stadium is the residence of the ES Troyes AC football club.

There are 580 clubs and sports associations in the Aube department. The main ones are:

- ES Troyes AC: soccer club in the French Ligue 1;
- ETAC Handball: Handball Club at National Level 3;
- Union Sportive de Sainte Maure Troyes Handball: Women's handball club at National Level 1;
- Pygargues of Troyes: american football club in Division 2;
- PLAVB (Troyes): volleyball club at Regional one;
- SUMA (Troyes): Motoball club of France (one of the most successful) moved to elite since the 1930s;
- Troyes roller hockey: roller hockey club playing at National Level 2;
- Espadons (Swordfish )(Troyes): baseball club playing at Regional Level 1;
- Romilly Association for Sports 10: which includes multiple sections.

=== Media ===
==== Radio ====
At Troyes there are three independent local radio stations:

- Radio Latitude: that broadcasts programming focused on the dance floor. This was the first local radio station in the department. It broadcasts from Troyes, Romilly-sur-Seine, and Vendeuvre-sur-Barse
- Theme Radio: community radio broadcasting music and information flashes
- Troyes Campus radio: rock music oriented radio and sometimes rap

At Romilly-sur-Seine, in addition to Latitude Radio, there is a local independent radio broadcaster: Radio Aube et Seine.

French Christian Radio (RCF) Aube is located in the department.

==== Television ====
- Canal 32: television network with a local Troyes and department station
- France 3 Aube (France 3 Lorraine Champagne-Ardenne)

==== Daily newspapers ====
| Name | Place | Distribution Area | Press Group | Circulation |
|---|---|---|---|---|
| L'Est-Éclair | Saint-André-les-Vergers (agglomération de Troyes) | Aube | Groupe Hersant Média | 27,948 |
| Libération Champagne | Troyes | Aube | Groupe Hersant Média | 6,395 |

=== Justice ===
All Aube jurisdictions are located in Troyes. The city has a Tribunal d'instance and a High Court, a commercial court and an Employment Tribunal for civil and criminal jurisdictions. There is also a Correctional court and a Juvenile court.

Appeals, however, are passed to the Court of Appeal in Reims.

=== Waste management ===
Aube currently has two storage facilities for radioactive waste:

- Storage Centre for Very Low Activity Waste (CSTFA)
- Storage Centre for Low and Medium Activity Waste (CSFMA)

== Culture and heritage ==
=== Cultural venues ===
==== Theatres and concerts ====
- The Cube – in the Parc des Expositions in Troyes
- Champagne Theatre
- Théâtre of la Madeleine
- Argence space

==== Cinemas ====
The four main theatres are:

- Ciné City in Troyes
- Vagabond in Bar-sur-Aube
- Lumière in Nogent-sur-Seine
- Cinema Eden in Romilly-sur-Seine

==== Cultural festivities ====
- Festival in Othe
- Aube Templiers 2012 event

==== Gastronomy ====
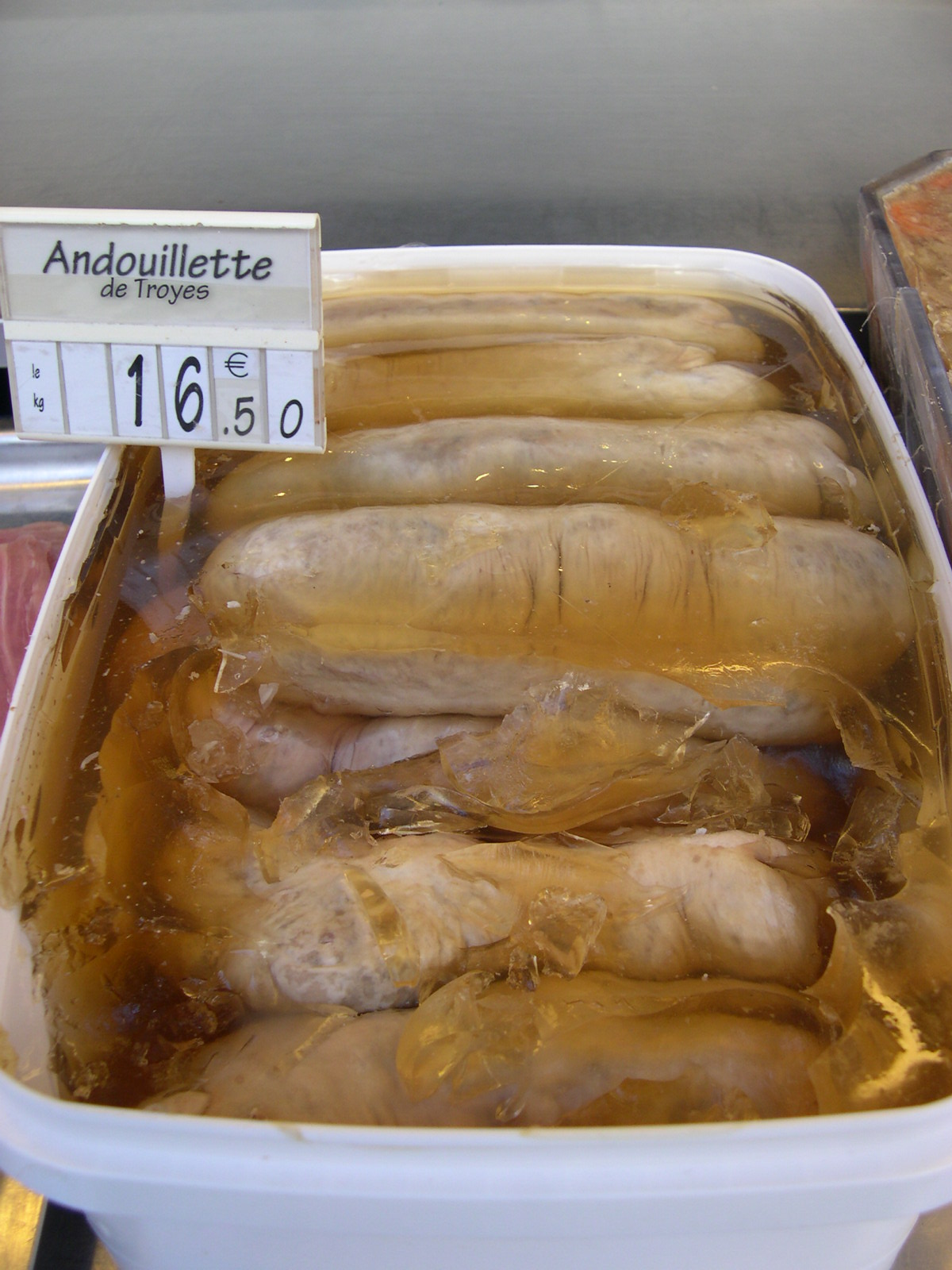
Andouillette from Troyes.

- Andouillette from Troyes
- Barberey cheese
- Cacibel liqueur
- Montgueux champagne
- Chaource cheese
- Chocolate from Jacquot (Cémoi group)
- Sauerkraut from Brienne-le-Château
- Cider from Othe country
- Prunelle de Troyes liqueur
- Rosé des Riceys wine

=== Monuments and tourist sites ===
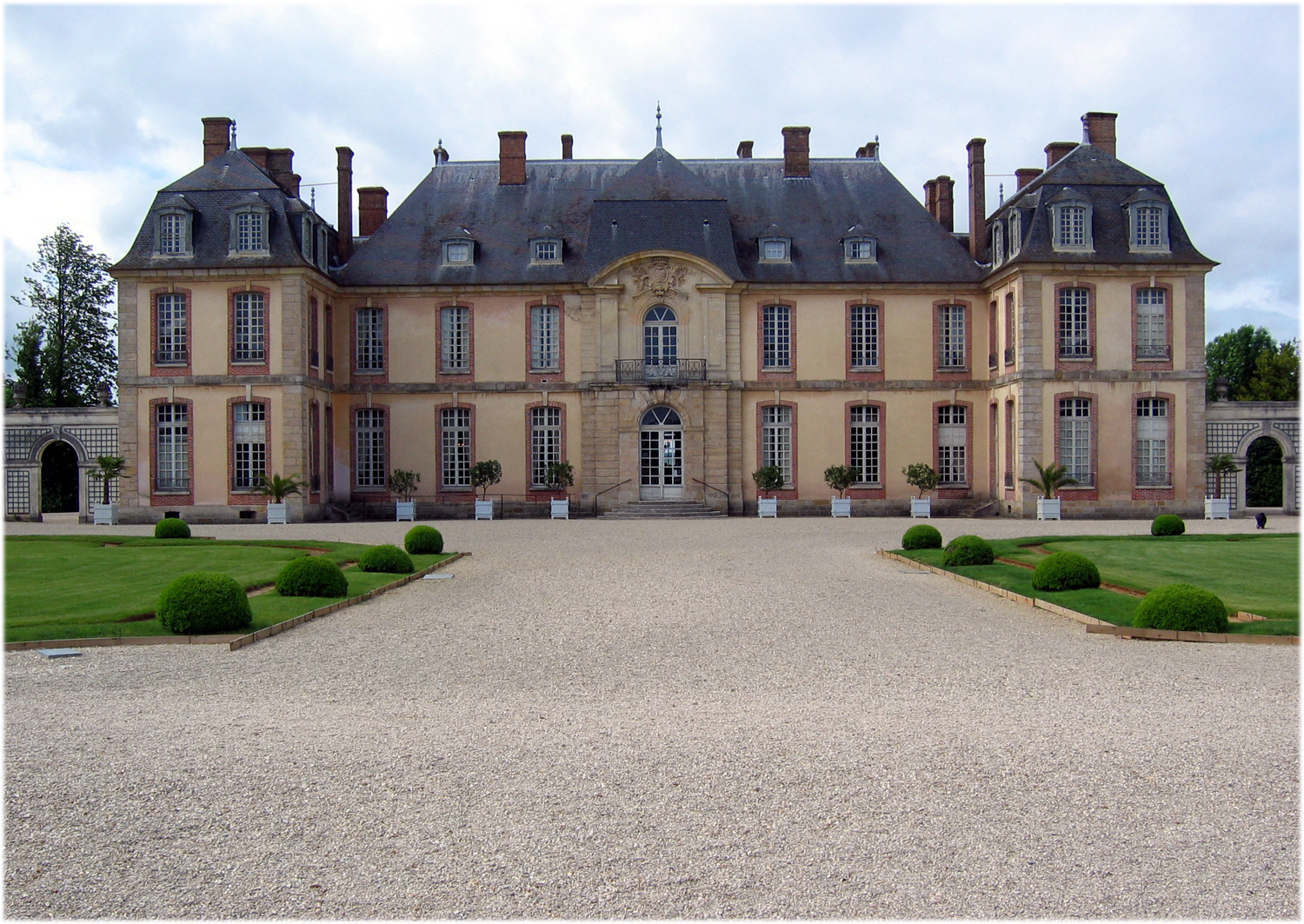
The castle of La Motte-Tilly

The Aube has 365 historical monuments of which 144 are classified, and 221 are enrolled.

==== Castles ====
- La Motte-Tilly Castle
- Bligny Castle
- Droupt-Saint-Basle Castle
- Barberey-Saint-Sulpice Castle
- Brienne-le-Château Castle

==== Museums ====
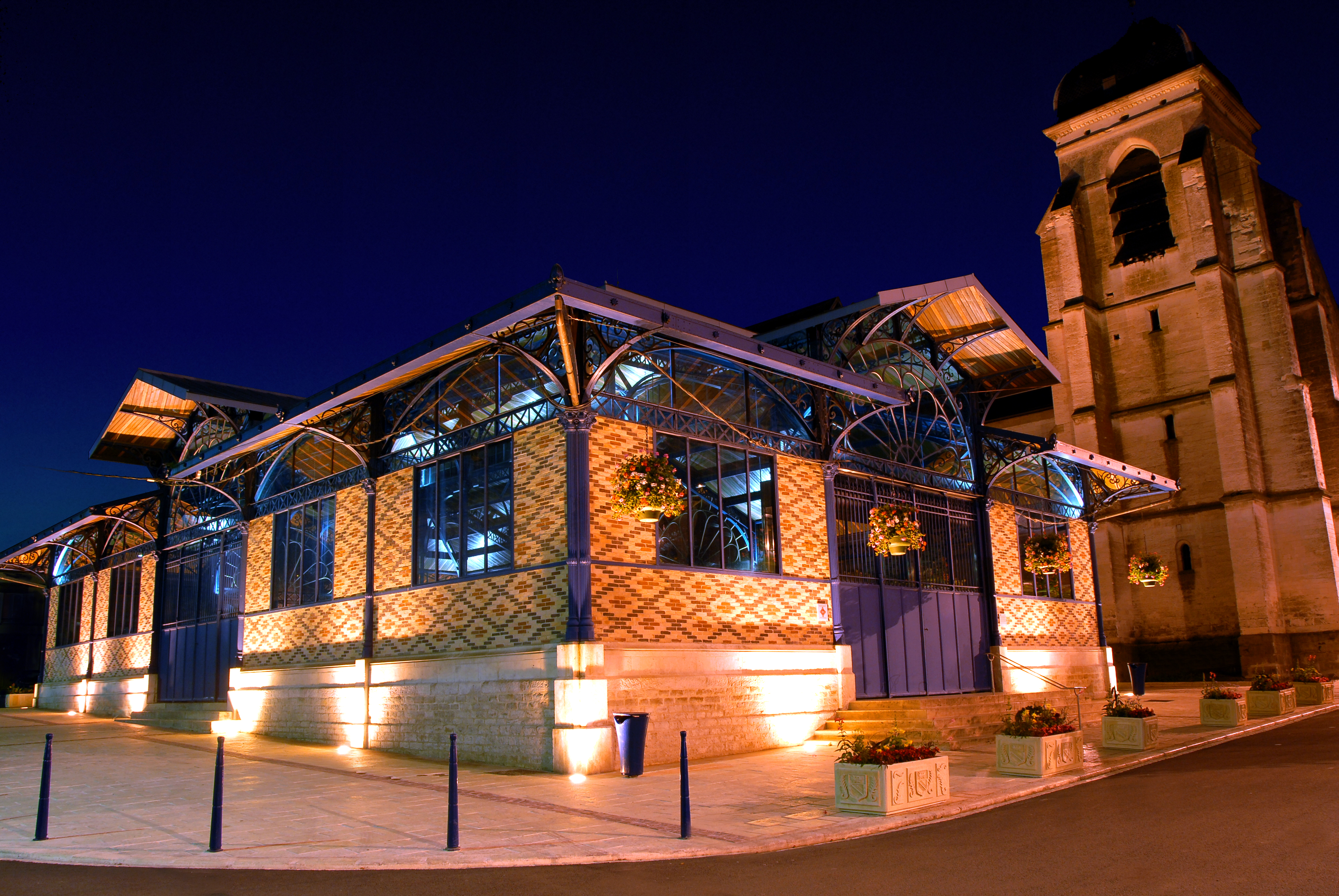
Hall in the style of Baltard d'Aix en Othe

- Napoleon Museum (Brienne-le-Château)
- Museum Hugues de Payens (Payns)
- Resistance Museum (Mussy-sur-Seine)
- Cider Museum (Eaux-Puiseaux)
- Museum of the old Champagne malt house (La Chapelle-Saint-Luc)
- Cheese Museum (Chaource)
- Museum of crystals – Centre Mazzolay (Bayel)
- Eco-Museum of the Orient Forest (Brienne-la-Vieille)
- House of Tools and Work Reflections (Troyes)
- Museum of Vauluisant (Troyes)
- Museum of peasant history (Champcharme)
- Museum of peasant memory (Estissac)
- Living Museum of Romilly hosiery (Romilly-sur-Seine)
- The Folk Art Museum (Droupt-Saint-Basle)
- Renoir Workshop (Essoyes)
- Museum of Modern Art (Troyes)
- Loukine Museum (Arsonval)
- Paul Dubois-Alfred Boucher Museum (Nogent-sur-Seine)
- Saint-Loup Museum (Troyes)
- Apothecary of the Hotel-Dieu-le-Comte (Troyes)
- Michel Marcu Museum of automata (Lusigny-sur-Barse)
- Di Marco Museum (Troyes)
- Museum of dolls of yesteryear and cooperage (Maisons-lès-Chaource)
- Museum of the Simple Past (Crésantignes)
- Aube Educational History Museum
- Museum of news design in the press (Troyes)

==== Other historic sites ====
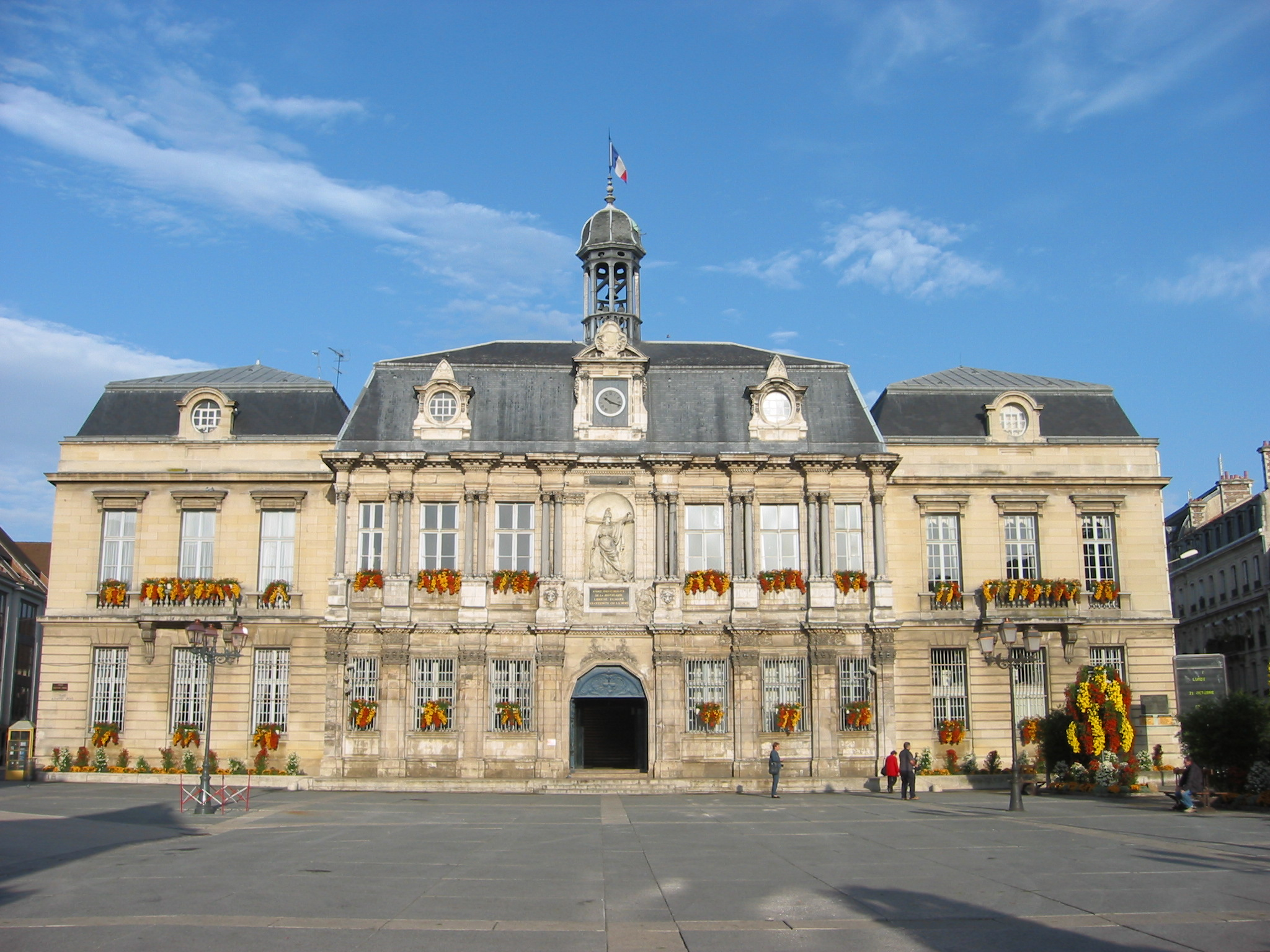
The Hôtel de Ville in Troyes

- Clairvaux Abbey
- Basilica of St. Urbain, Troyes
- Abbey of Saint-Loup of Troyes
- Monastery Notre-Dame of Saint Espérance
- Hotel of Marisy
- Hotel de Ville in Troyes
- Hotel of the prefecture of Aube

=== Tourist places ===
- Orient Forest Regional Natural Park
- Orient Lake
- Amance and Temple Lakes
- Nigloland: amusement park located at Dolancourt
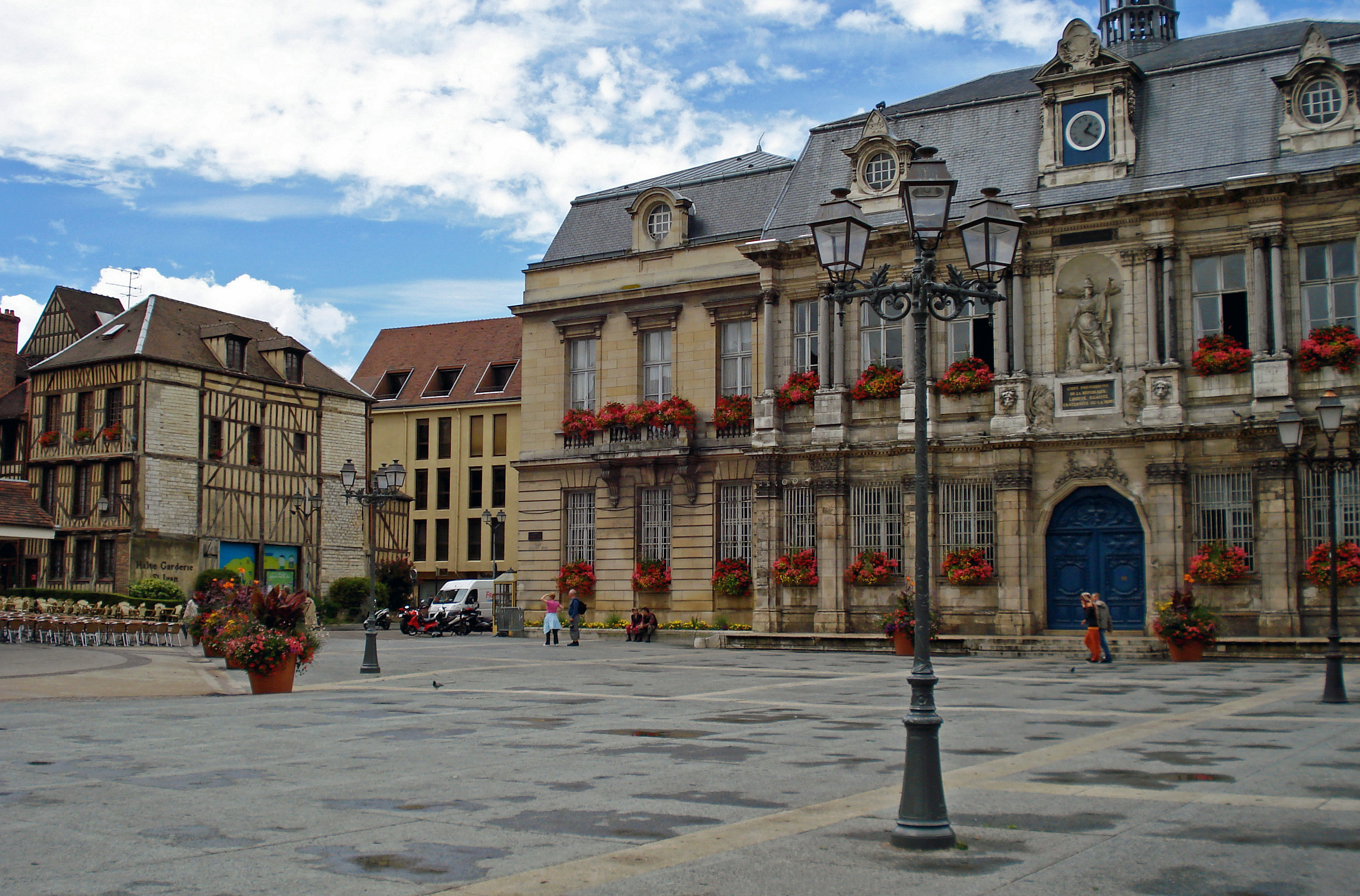
Troyes

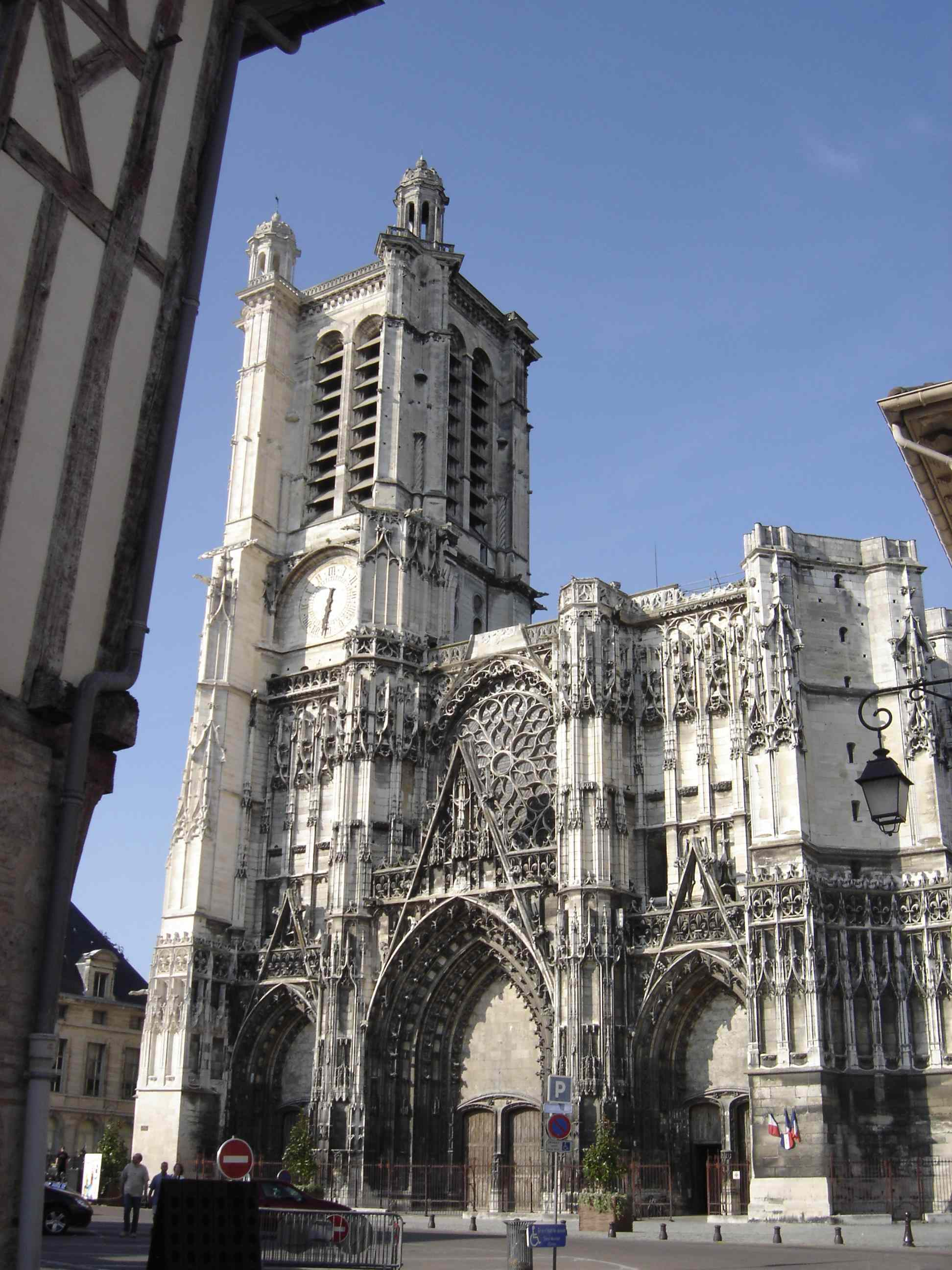
Troyes Cathedral

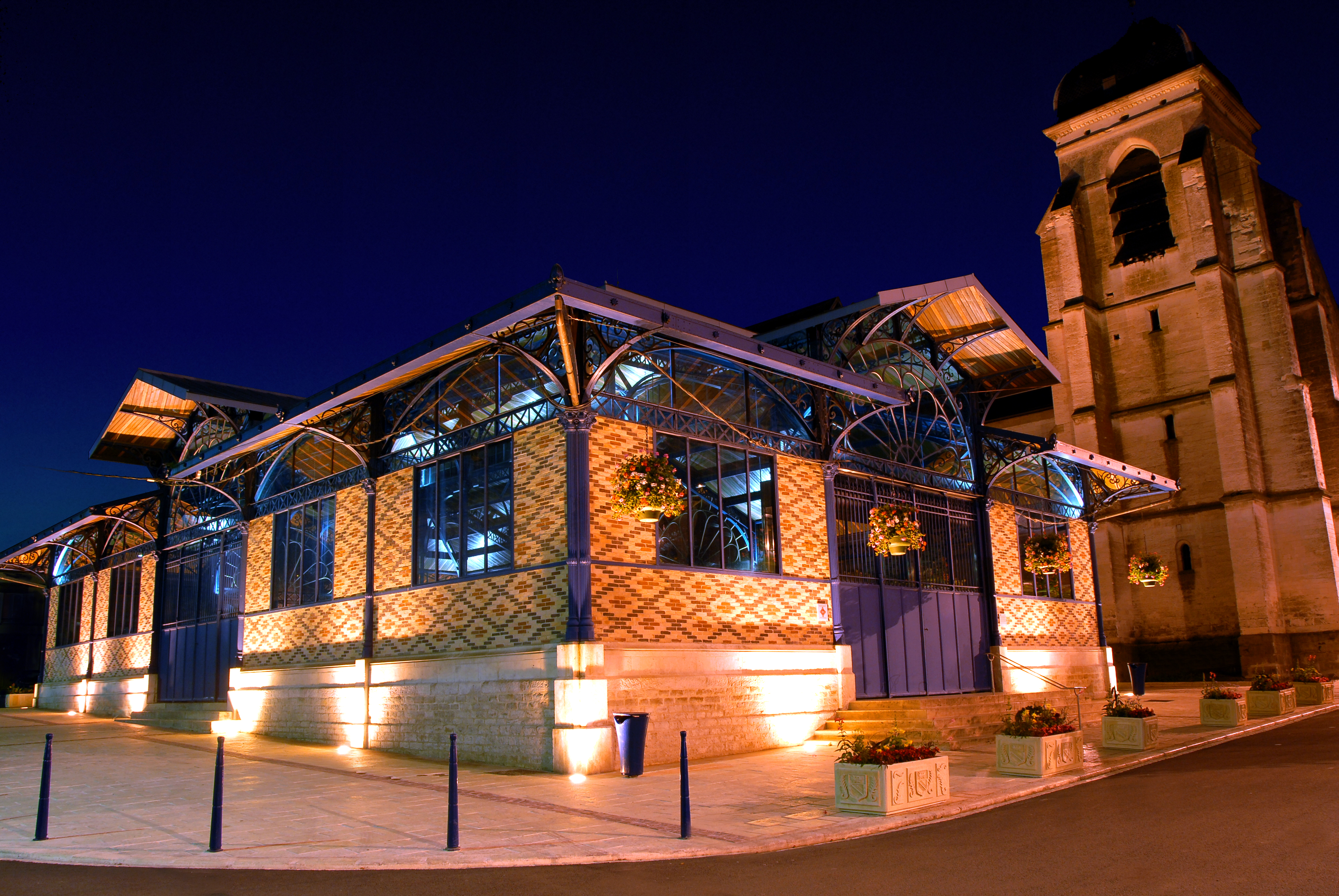
Aix-en-Othe

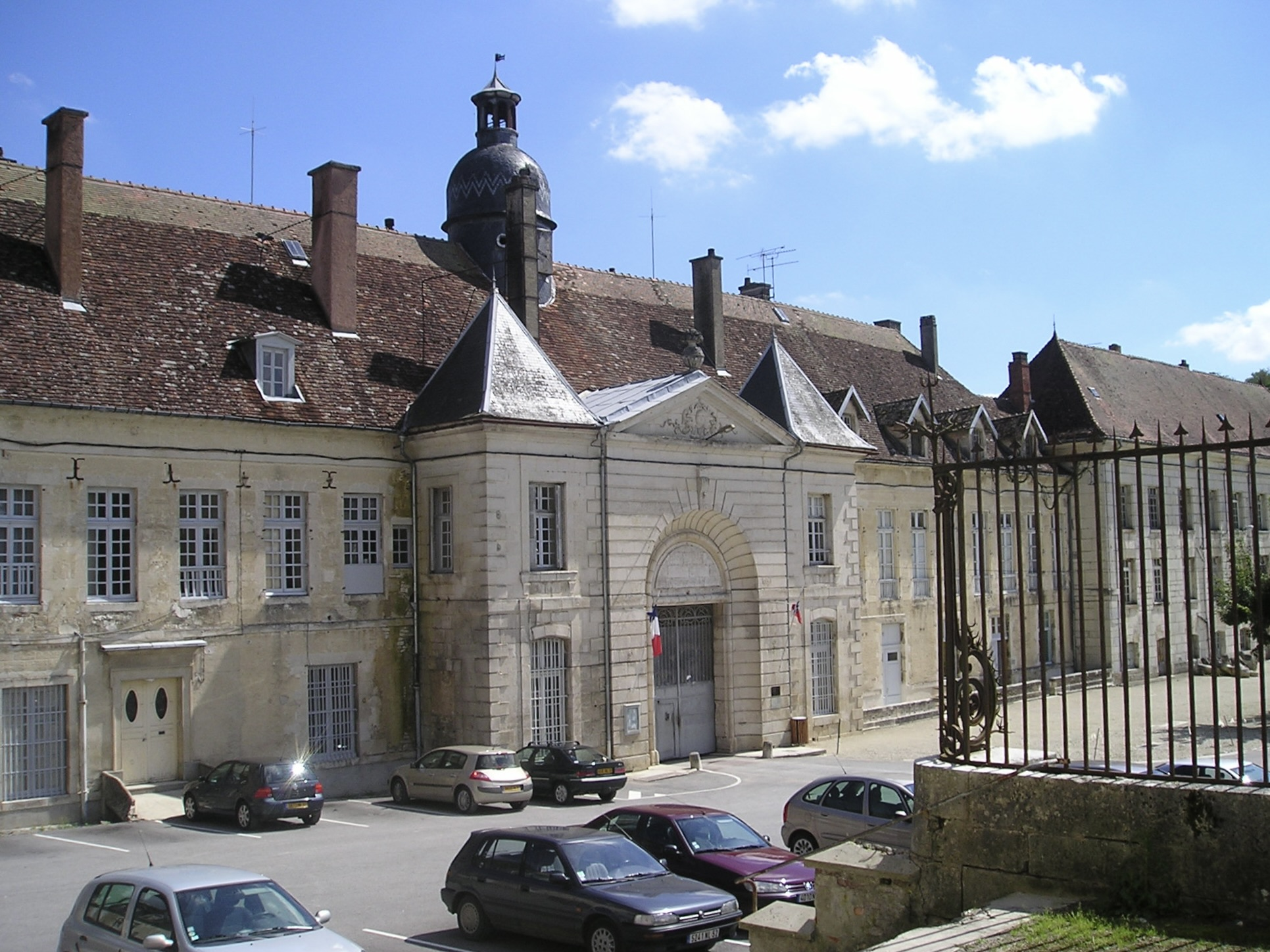
Clairvaux Abbey

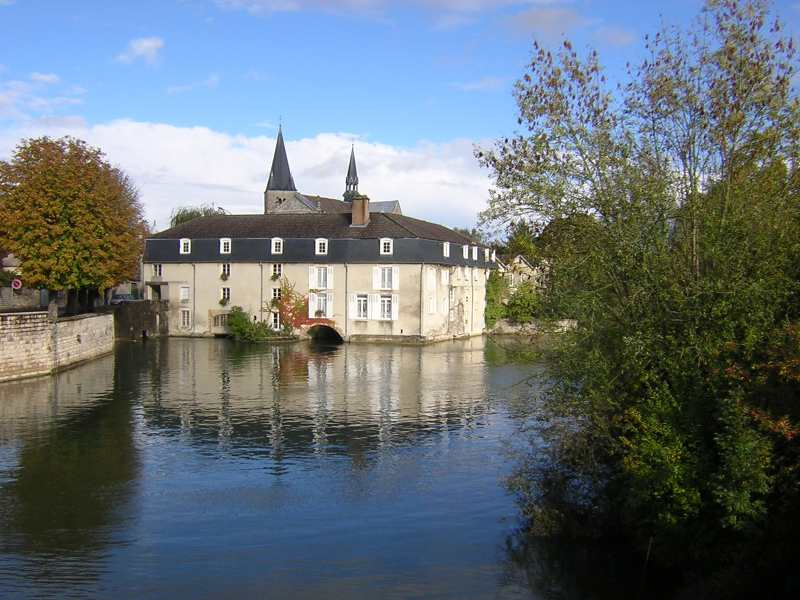
Bar-sur-Aube

== Notable people linked to the department ==
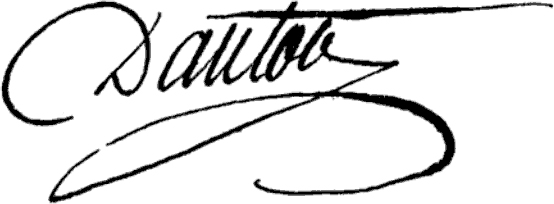
Signature of Danton.

- Chrétien de Troyes, writer
- Urbain IV, Pope
- Georges Jacques Danton, Revolutionary
- Martin-Pierre Gauthier, Architect
- Jacques-Nicolas Paillot de Montabert, Painter
- Henri Gambey, Inventor
- Alexandre Du Sommerard, Archeologist
- Louis Jacques Thénard, Chemist
- Sylvain Charles Valée, Marshal of France
- Jacques Claude Beugnot, Politician
- Nicolas Desmarest, Geologist
- Pierre-Jean Grosley, Historian
- Edmé Boursault, Man of Letters
- Jean de Brienne, King of Jerusalem
- Jules Guyot, Physician, oenologist (1807–1872)
- Charles Baltet, Horticulturalist (1830–1908)
- Gabriel Bonvalot, Explorer (1853–1933)
- Gaston Bachelard, Philosopher and professor at Bar-sur-Aube
- Gaston Cheq, Leader of the revolt of the wine-growers in 1911
- Olivier Messiaen, Composer, Organist, ornithologist, Fuligny, Aube, 1928–1931

== See also ==
- Cantons of the Aube department
- Communes of the Aube department
- Arrondissements of the Aube department
