= Barberey-Saint-Sulpice =

Commune in Grand Est, France

- Commune
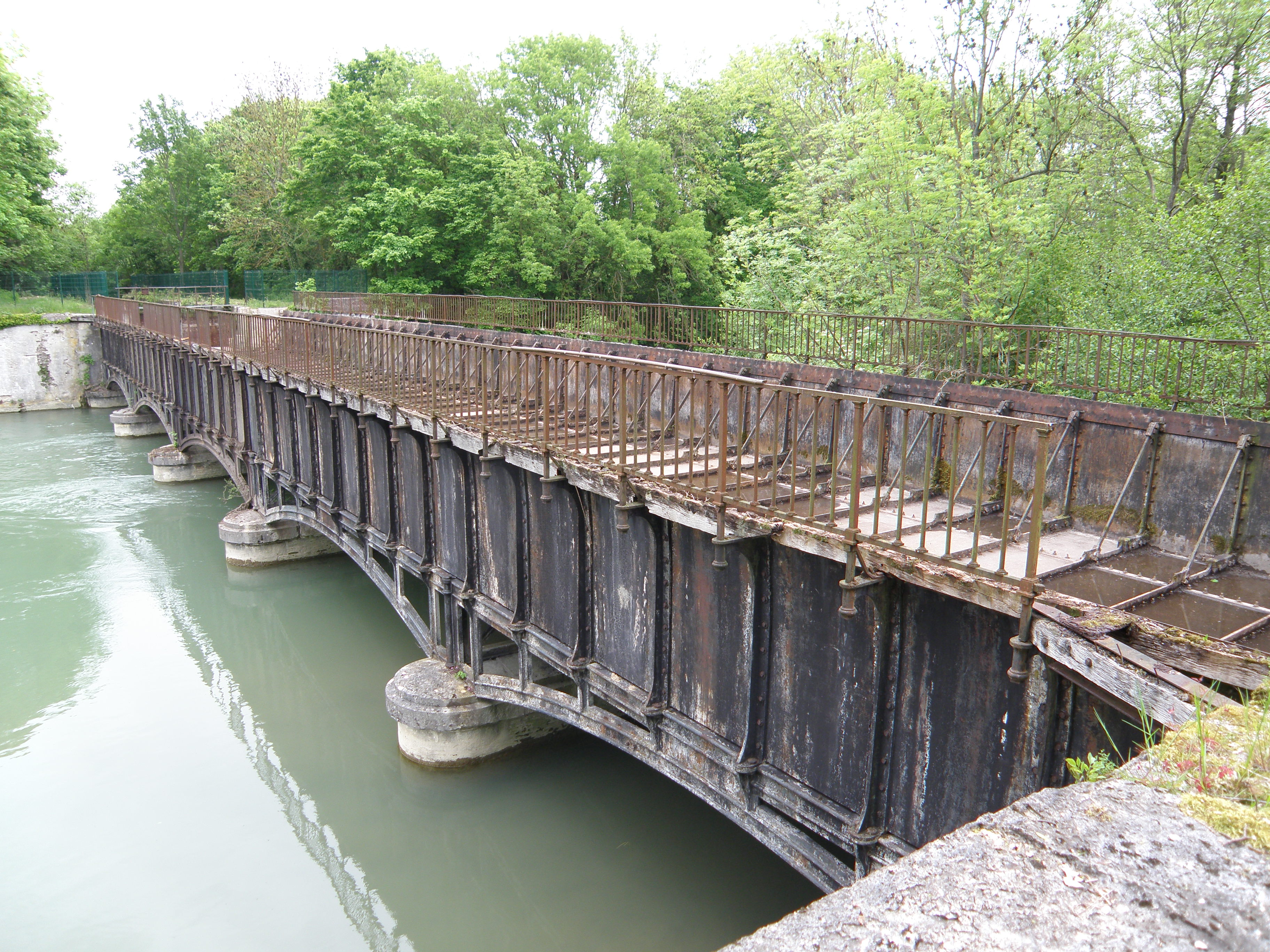
- The Canal Bridge
- Location of Barberey-Saint-Sulpice
- Location within France Location within Grand Est
- Coordinates: 48°20′19″N 4°01′57″E
- Country: France
- Region: Grand Est
- Department: Aube
- Arrondissement: Troyes
- Canton: Saint-Lyé
- Intercommunality: CA Troyes Champagne Métropole

Government
  - Mayor (2020–2026): Alain Hubinois
- Area^{1}: 9.36 km^{2} (3.61 sq mi)
- Elevation: 150 m (490 ft)
- Population (2023): 1,542
  - Density: 165/km^{2} (427/sq mi)
- Time zone: UTC+01:00 (CET)
  - Summer (DST): UTC+02:00 (CEST)
- INSEE/Postal code: 10030 /10600
- ^{1} French Land Register data, which excludes lakes, ponds, glaciers > 1 km^{2} (0.386 sq mi or 247 acres) and river estuaries.

Barberey-Saint-Sulpice (French pronunciation: [baʁbəʁɛ sɛ̃ sylpis]) is a commune in the Aube department in the Grand Est region of north-central France.

== Geography ==
Barberey-Saint-Sulpice is located to the immediate north-west of Troyes with the Troyes - Barberey Airport located in the commune. Access to the commune is by the D619 highway which starts at the end of the D319 highway at the edge of Troyes and continues north-west through the commune to Fontaine-les-Grès. The D20 also passes through the commune from Troyes going north-west to Saint-Lyé. The D60 from Troyes to Dierrey-Saint-Pierre passes through the south-western end of the commune. The D619 comes from Sainte-Maure in the north-east and passes through the centre of the commune and the town and continues south-west to join the D60 in the commune. The airport runway crosses three-quarters of the commune west of the D619 from north to south with access to the airport terminal by the Route de l'Aerodrome branching off the D619. The main railway line from Troyes to the north-west passes through the commune with a station in the town. Apart from a large urban area covering most of the north-west of the commune and the airport occupying the centre, the rest of the commune is farmland.

The Seine river passes through the north-east of the commune as it flows north-west to eventually reach Paris and the Atlantic Ocean at Le Havre. The former Canal de la Haute-Seine begins in the commune and follows the Seine to eventually join the Aube at Marcilly-sur-Seine.

== Administration ==
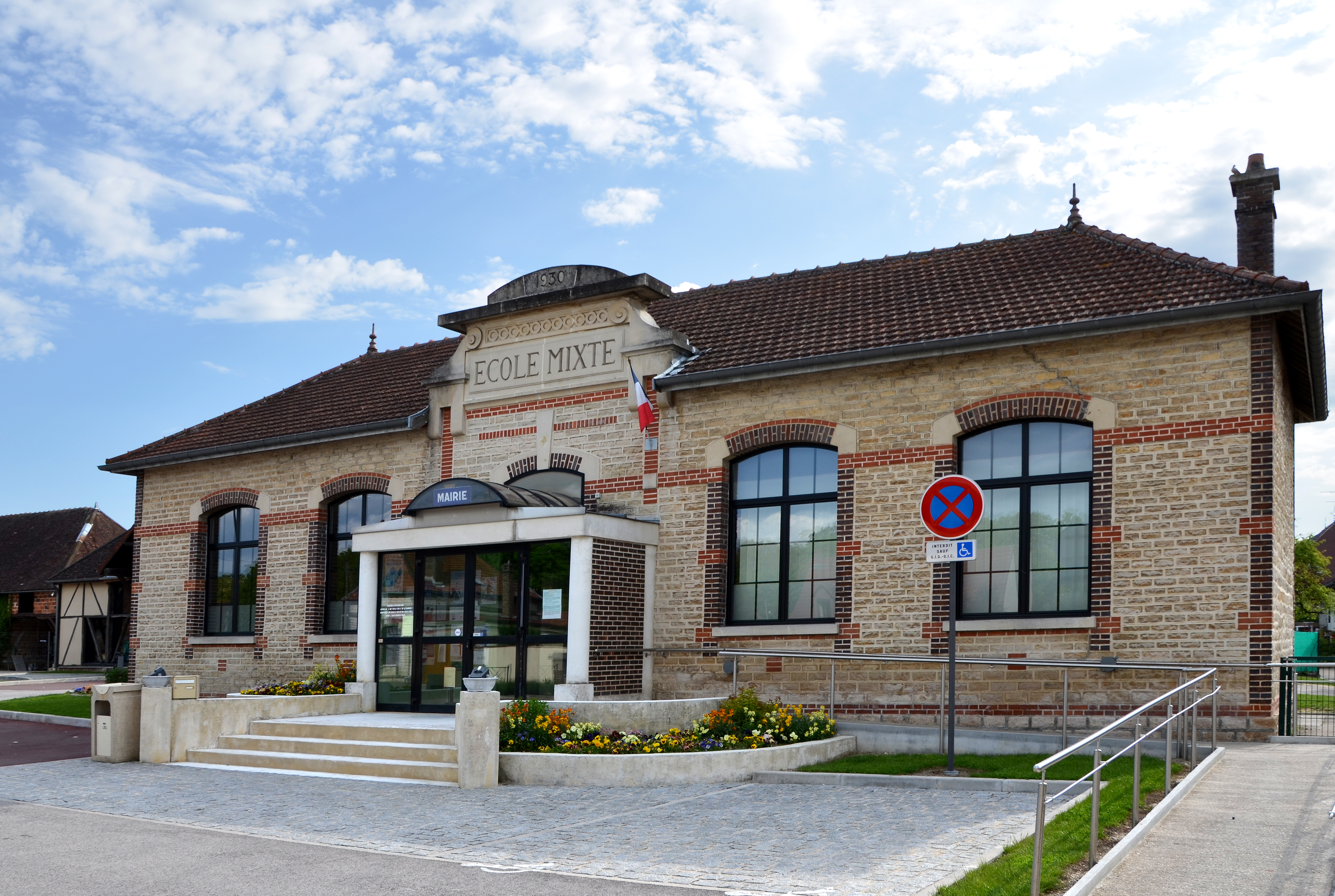
The Town Hall

List of Successive Mayors

From	To	Name
	1857	Gallice d'Ambly
	1887	Parigot
2001	2026	Alain Hubinois

== Demography ==
The inhabitants of the commune are known as Barberotins or Barberotines in French.

Historical population

Year	Pop.	±% p.a.
1793	256	—
1821	293	+0.48%
1846	432	+1.57%
1872	313	−1.23%
1901	292	−0.24%
1926	381	+1.07%
1946	530	+1.66%
1962	528	−0.02%
1968	768	+6.44%

Year	Pop.	±% p.a.
1975	756	−0.22%
1982	723	−0.64%
1990	654	−1.25%
1999	766	+1.77%
2007	1,176	+5.50%
2012	1,307	+2.13%
2017	1,449	+2.08%
2023	1,542	+1.04%

Source: EHESS and INSEE

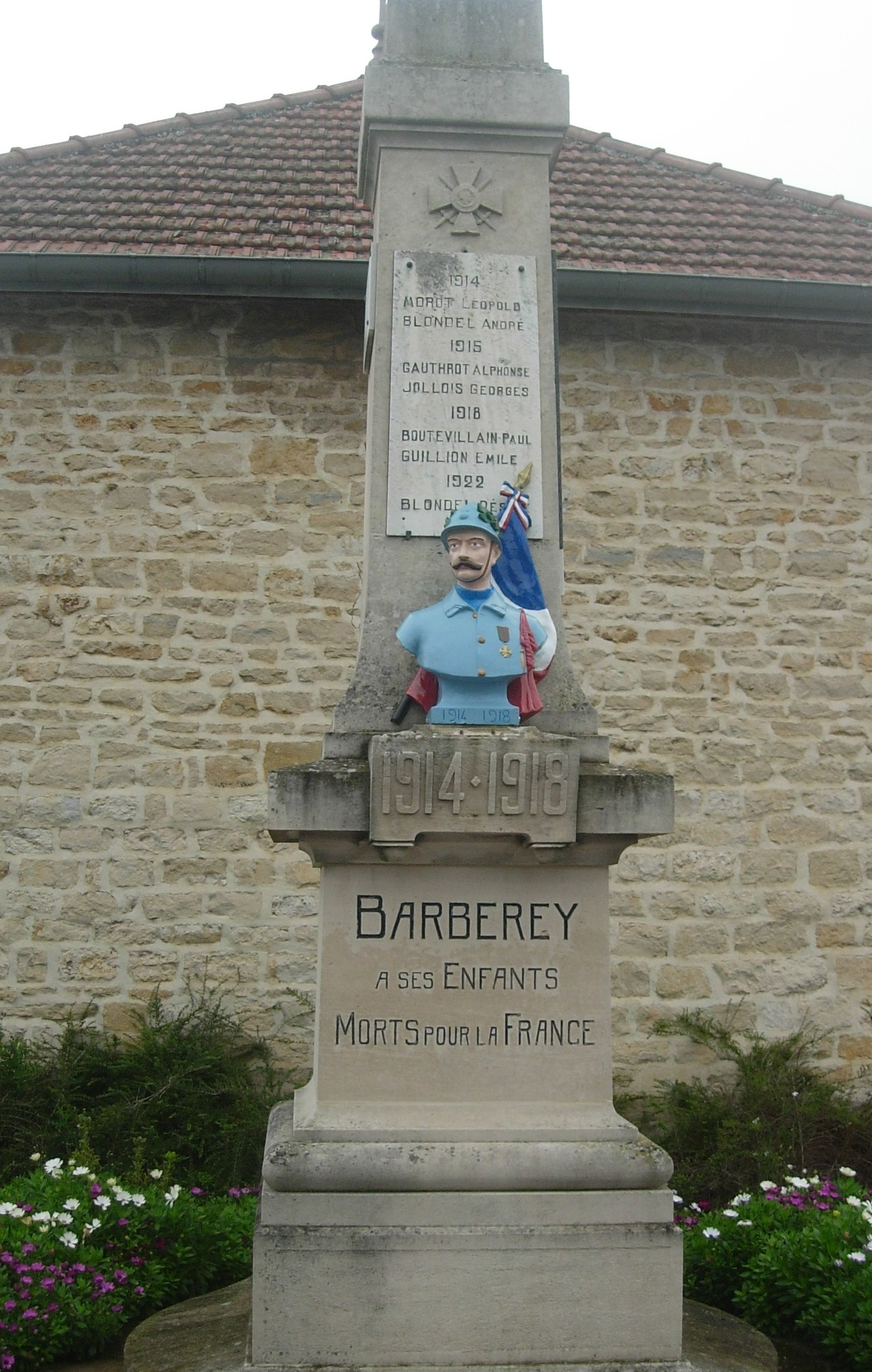
The War Memorial

== Culture and heritage ==
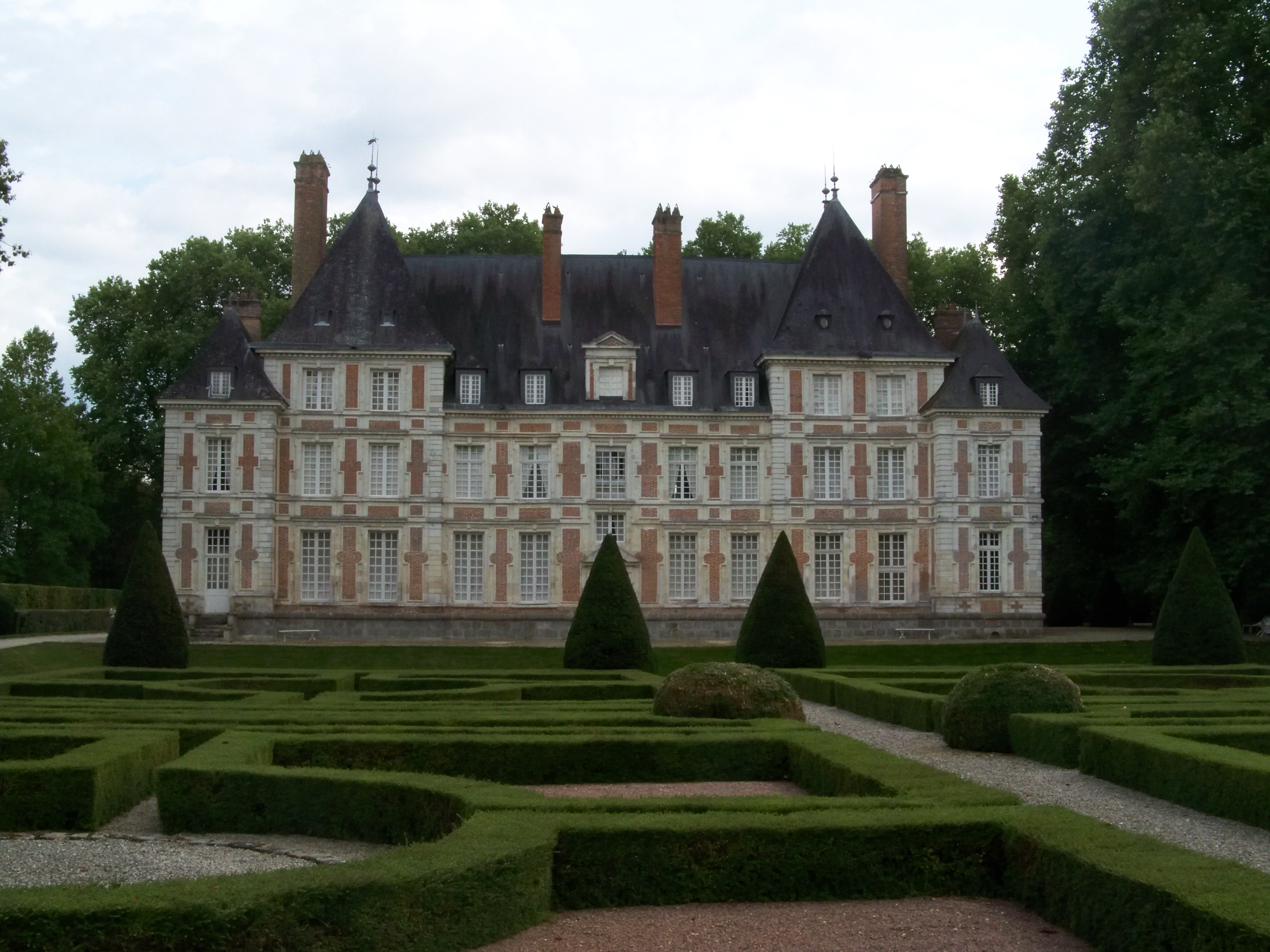
The Chateau

=== Civil heritage ===
The commune has a number of buildings and sites that are registered as historical monuments:

- A Canal Bridge over the Seine (1847)
- A Chateau (1626)
- The Huot Mill (now a hydro-electric power station) (19th century) The Mill contains an Hydraulic Turbine (20th century) which is registered as an historical object.

=== Religious heritage ===
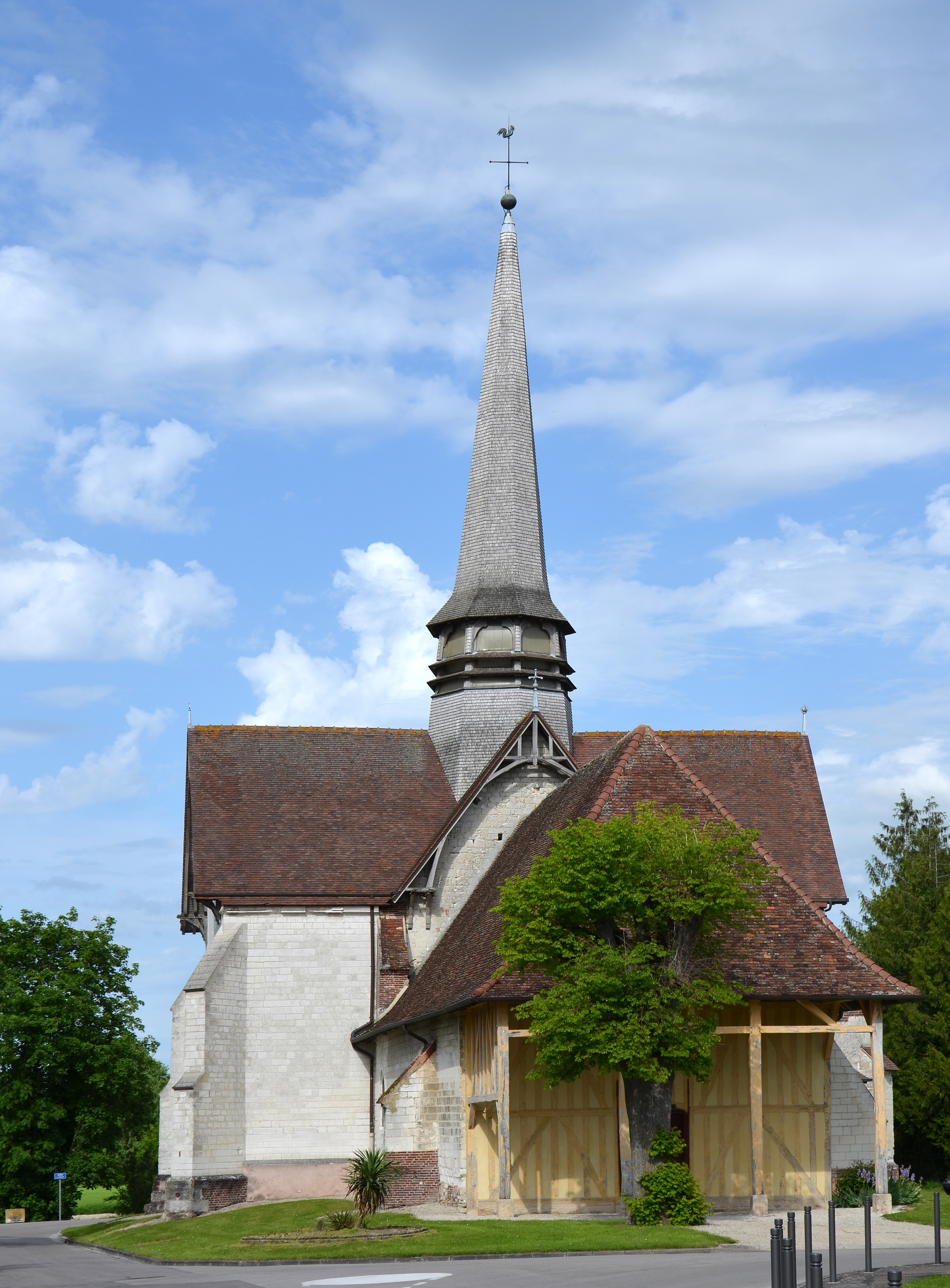
The Church of Saint-Sulpice

The Parish Church of Saint-Sulpice (12th century) is registered as an historical monument. has a Romanesque nave from the 12th century and a choir and transept from the 16th and 17th centuries. There is a wooden Renaissance tribune of twenty-five panels. The façade and porch are half-timbered. The Church contains a very large number of items that are registered as historical objects.

== Notable people linked to the commune ==
- Claude-Louis Bruslé de Valsuzenay (6 December 1766 Paris - 2 March 1825 Paris), French politician and senior official in the 18th and 19th centuries, Châtelain of Barberey.

== See also ==
- Communes of the Aube department
