= André Lefèvre =

André Lefèvre or Lefevre may refer to:

- André Lefèvre (1717–1768), French contributor to the Encyclopédie
- André Lefèvre (Scouting) (1887–1946), French Scouting notable
- André Joseph Lefèvre (1869–1929), French minister of defence
- André le Fèvre, Dutch footballer who competed at the 1924 Summer Olympics
- André Lefevere, Belgian-American translation theorist

== See also ==
- André Lefèbvre (1894-1964), French automobile engineer
