= Hôtel de Ville, Troyes =

Town hall in Troyes, France

Hôtel de Ville
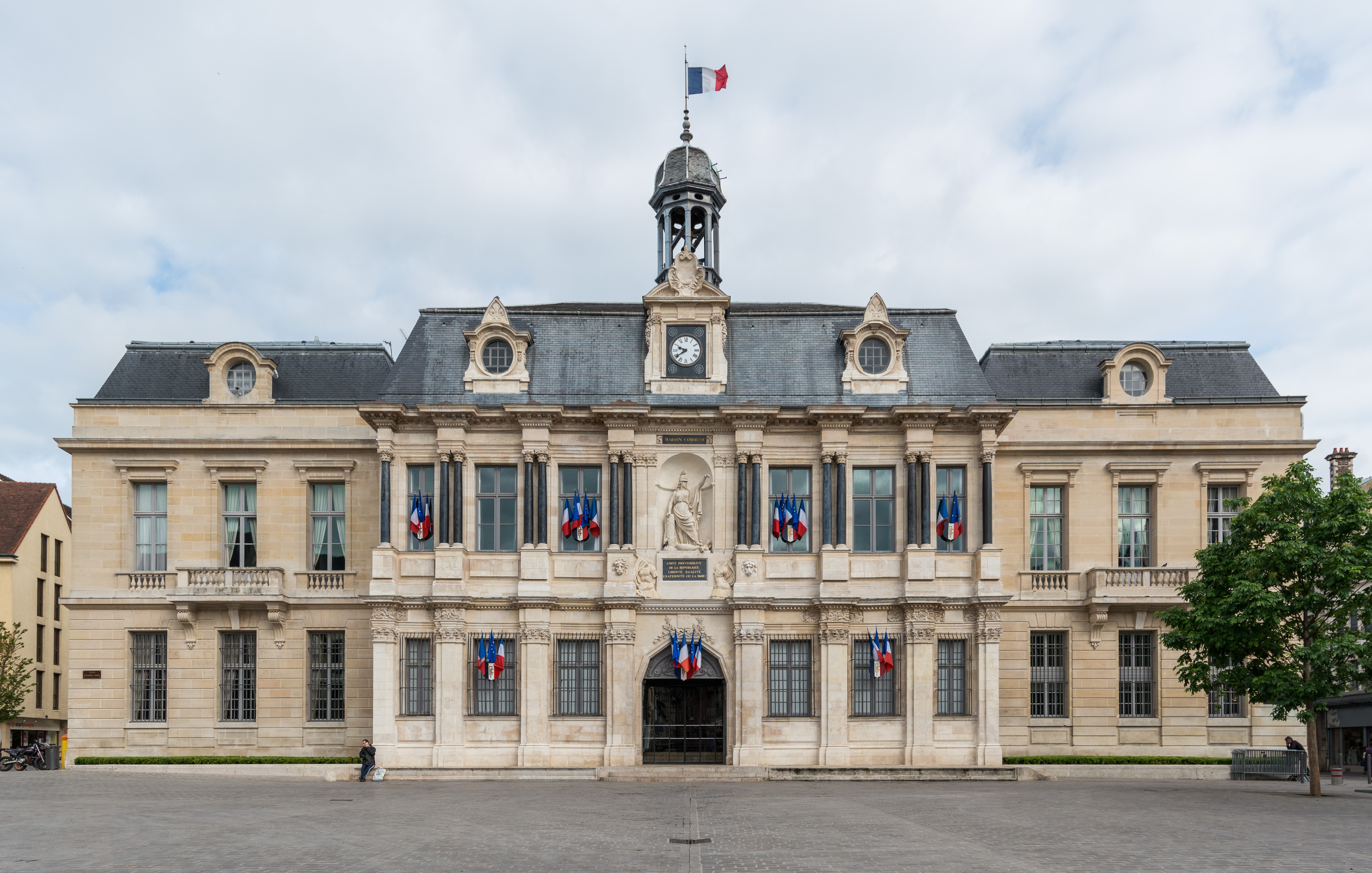
- The main frontage of the Hôtel de Ville in May 2014

General information
- Type: City hall
- Architectural style: Louis XIII style
- Location: Troyes, France
- Coordinates: 48.2974°N 4.0742°E
- Completed: 1670

Design and construction
- Architects: Louis Noblet and Pierre Cottard

Monument historique
- Official name: Hôtel de ville
- Type: Inscrit
- Designated: 1926
- Reference no.: PA00078272

The Hôtel de Ville (French pronunciation: [otɛl də vil], City Hall) is a municipal building in Troyes, Aube, northeast France, standing on Place Alexandre Israël. It was designated a monument historique by the French government in 1926.

== History ==
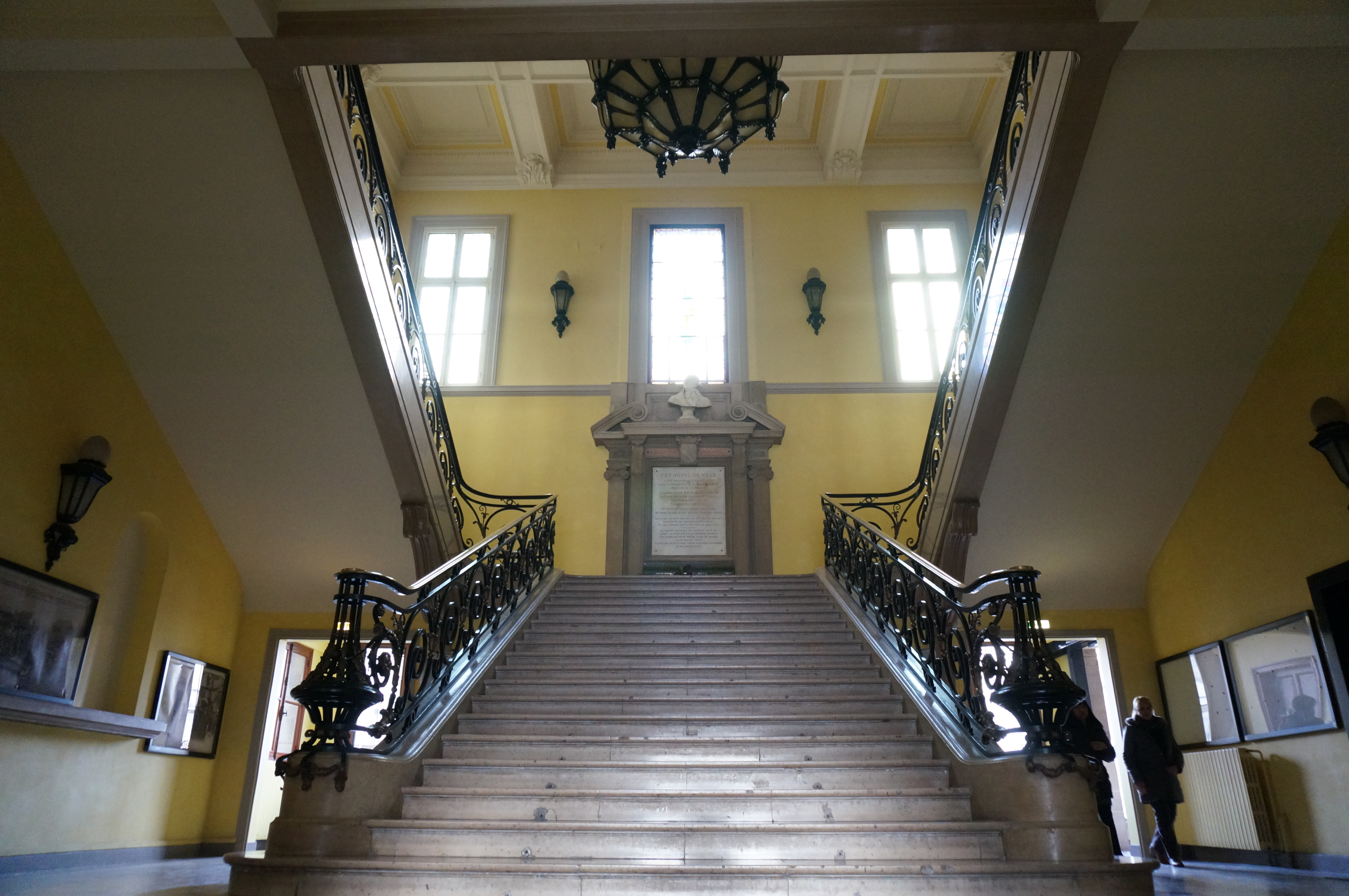
The imperial staircase

The first municipal building in Troyes was a belfry, near to l'église Saint-Nicolas, which dated back at least to the 13th century. From the mid-14th century, the civic leaders met in the Salle de Royale in the Palais des Comtes de Champagne in September or October each year. Then, after the local council was re-organised in 1429, they relocated to a building close to the Saint-Urbain Basilica, which they rented from Laurent Tournier for six livres a year. This building became known as the Chambre de l'Échevinage (the alderman's house). A bell, known as "Marie la Bourgeoise", called the aldermen to meetings.

In 1495, the council acquired a late 14th century residential property on Place de la Belle Croix (now Place Alexandre Israël), close to l'Eglise de Saint-Jean-au-Marché, from Jeanne de Mesgrigny at a cost of 2,770 livres: this building, which was restored in 1511, accommodated the aldermen for over a century and became known as l'Hôtel de Mesgrigny.

In the early 17th century, Louis XIII approved the demolition of the l'Hôtel de Mesgrigny and granted 30,000 livres for the construction of a new town hall on the same site. The foundation stone for the new building was laid by the mayor, Joseph de Vienne, on 8 July 1624. It was designed by Louis Noblet in the Louis XIII style and built in ashlar stone. Progress was delayed because of lack of funding; work resumed under the architectural guidance of Pierre Cottard in 1665 and the building was officially opened by the mayor, Nicolas Vauthier, in 1670.

The design involved a symmetrical main frontage of seven bays facing onto Place de la Belle Croix. The central bay featured an opening with a five-sided arch on the ground floor, and a niche on the first floor. The other bays were fenestrated by casement windows on both floors. On the ground floor, the bays were separated by Corinthian order pilasters supporting a cornice, and the first floor they were separated by paired Corinthian order columns of blue marble supporting an entablature and a modillioned cornice. The structure was surmounted by a mansard roof. A statue depicting Louis XIV fighting a hydra was created by François Mignot and installed in the niche on the front of the building in 1687.

Internally, the principal rooms was the Salle du Conseil (council chamber), which featured a marble medallion depicting Louis XIV created by François Girardon in 1687, and the Grand Salon (Grand Ballroom) which featured some ornate plasterwork. The relief of Louis XIV on the front of the building was torn down in 1793, during the Reign of Terror at the height of the French Revolution: it was initially replaced by a statue representing Liberty with a Phrygian cap, but a helmeted statue of the goddess Minerva was installed there during the Restoration.

A wing to the west was completed in 1934 and a wing to the east was completed in 1937. They were fenestrated by casement windows with voussoirs on the ground floor and by casement windows with cornices on the first floor, and were surmounted by mansard roofs in a similar style to the main block. A major programme of restoration works to clean up the main façade was completed in 2012. It was accompanied by a programme to landscape the area in front of the building.
