= Troyes–Barberey Airport =

Airport in France

Troyes–Barberey Airport Aéroport de Troyes–Barberey
- IATA: QYR; ICAO: LFQB

Summary
- Airport type: Public
- Operator: CCI de Troyes et de l'Aube
- Serves: Troyes, France
- Location: Barberey-Saint-Sulpice
- Elevation AMSL: 388 ft / 118 m
- Coordinates: 48°19′18″N 004°01′00″E
- Website: www.troyes.aeroport.fr

Maps
- Location of Champagne-Ardenne region in France

- Location of airport in Champagne-Ardenne region

Runways
| Direction | Length | | Surface |
| Direction | m | ft | Surface |
|---|---|---|---|
| 18/36 | 1,650 | 5,413 | Asphalt |
| 18R/36L | 900 | 2,953 | Grass |
| 05/23 | 780 | 2,559 | Grass |
- Sources: French AIP

Troyes–Barberey Airport or Aéroport de Troyes–Barberey (IATA: QYR, ICAO: LFQB) is an airport located 2 km (1.1 nautical miles) northwest of Troyes in Barberey-Saint-Sulpice, both communes of the Aube département in the Champagne-Ardenne région of France.

== Facilities ==
The airport resides at an elevation of 388 feet (118 m) above mean sea level. It has three runways: 17/35 with an asphalt surface measuring 1,650 by 30 metres (5,413 ft × 98 ft); 17R/35L with a grass surface measuring 900 by 100 metres (2,953 ft × 328 ft); and 05/23 with a grass surface measuring 780 by 100 metres (2,559 ft × 328 ft).

== Airlines and destinations ==
There are no services to and from Troyes since Danube Wings, the last remaining carrier, cancelled its seasonal service to Bastia in January 2013.
