= Haute-Seine Canal =

Abandoned canal in central France

Canal de la Haute-Seine

Geography
- Start point: Marcilly-sur-Seine
- End point: Troyes
- Beginning coordinates: 48.5607°N 3.7180°E

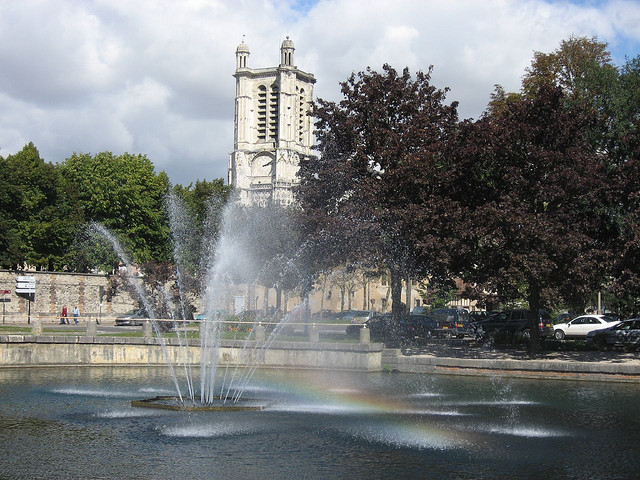
Troyes Fountain

The Canal de la Haute-Seine (French pronunciation: [kanal də la ot sɛn]) is an abandoned canal in central France. It used to connect the navigable Seine at Marcilly-sur-Seine to Troyes. It was constructed between 1808 and 1846. It was closed for navigation in 1957.

== See also ==
- List of canals in France
