= Linard Gonthier =

French glass artist (1565 – after 1642)

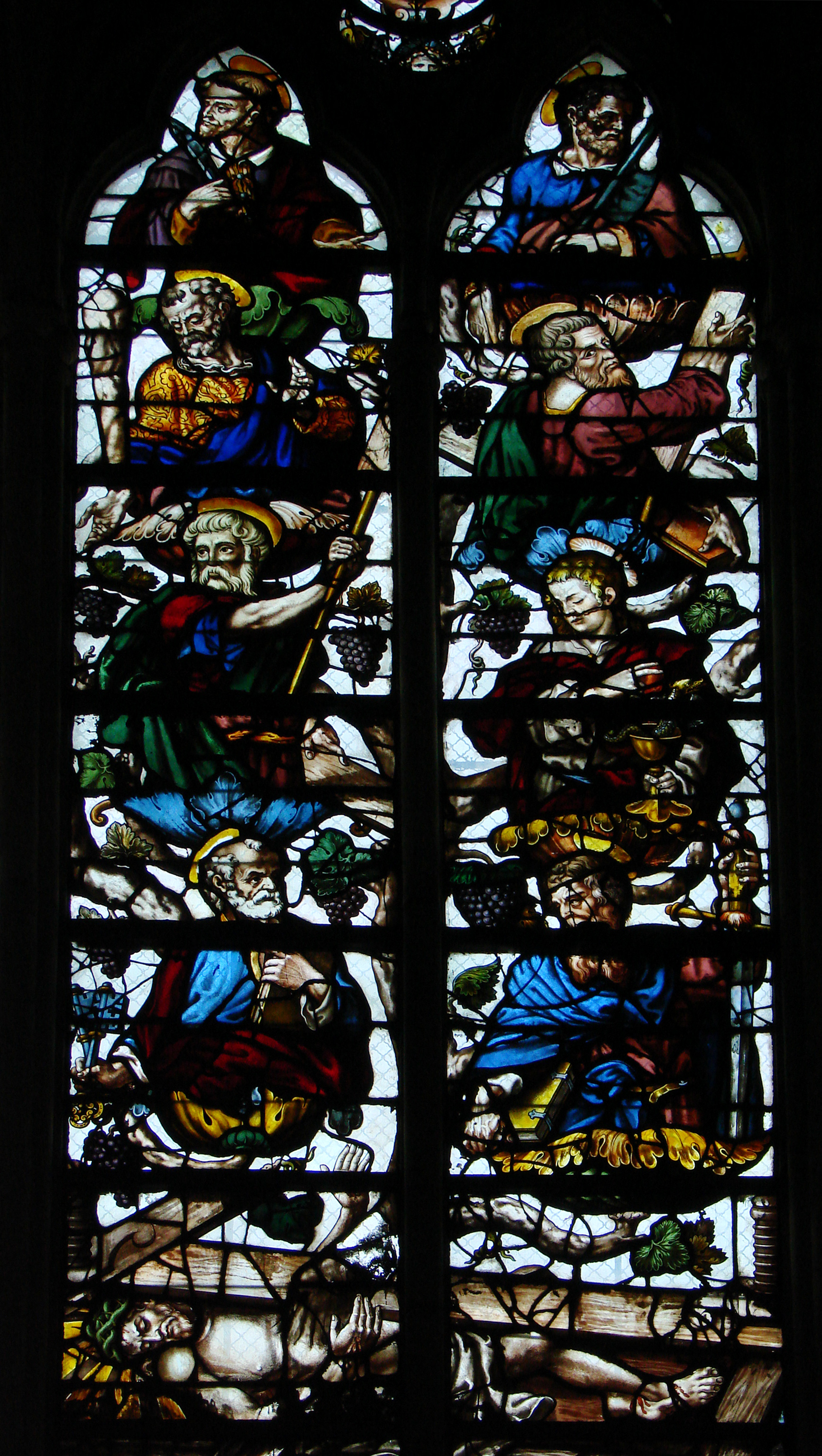
Vitrail du Pressoir mystique (1625) by Linard Gontier: Christ and the twelve apostles (detail). Cathédrale Saint-Pierre-et-Saint-Paul de Troyes

Linard Gonthier (1565 – after 1642) was a glass painter who worked in Troyes, France. Among his many works, he undertook the restoration of the stained glass in the church of Sainte-Savine.

The Rue Linard Gonthier in Troyes is named after him.

== Works ==
- Stained glass window The Mystical Winepress, from the medieval image of Christ in the winepress, in the fourth chapel along the north aisle of Troyes Cathedral, dated 1625, showing a vine springing from Christ's chest, with the apostles issuing from its flowers (see image)
- Pau, Pyrénées-Atlantiques, Musée national du château de Pau, Henri IV terrassant un centaure et la Bataille d’Ivry, double-sided drawing, dated 1610, box of stained glass for the Arquebuse Hotel in Troyes, engraved by Hogenberg
- Troyes, Musée des Beaux-Arts, Un Arquebusier, achat de la ville à la vente Lebrun-Dalbanne, 29 mai 1884, n° 67, Troyes.
