= Seine =

Major river in northern France

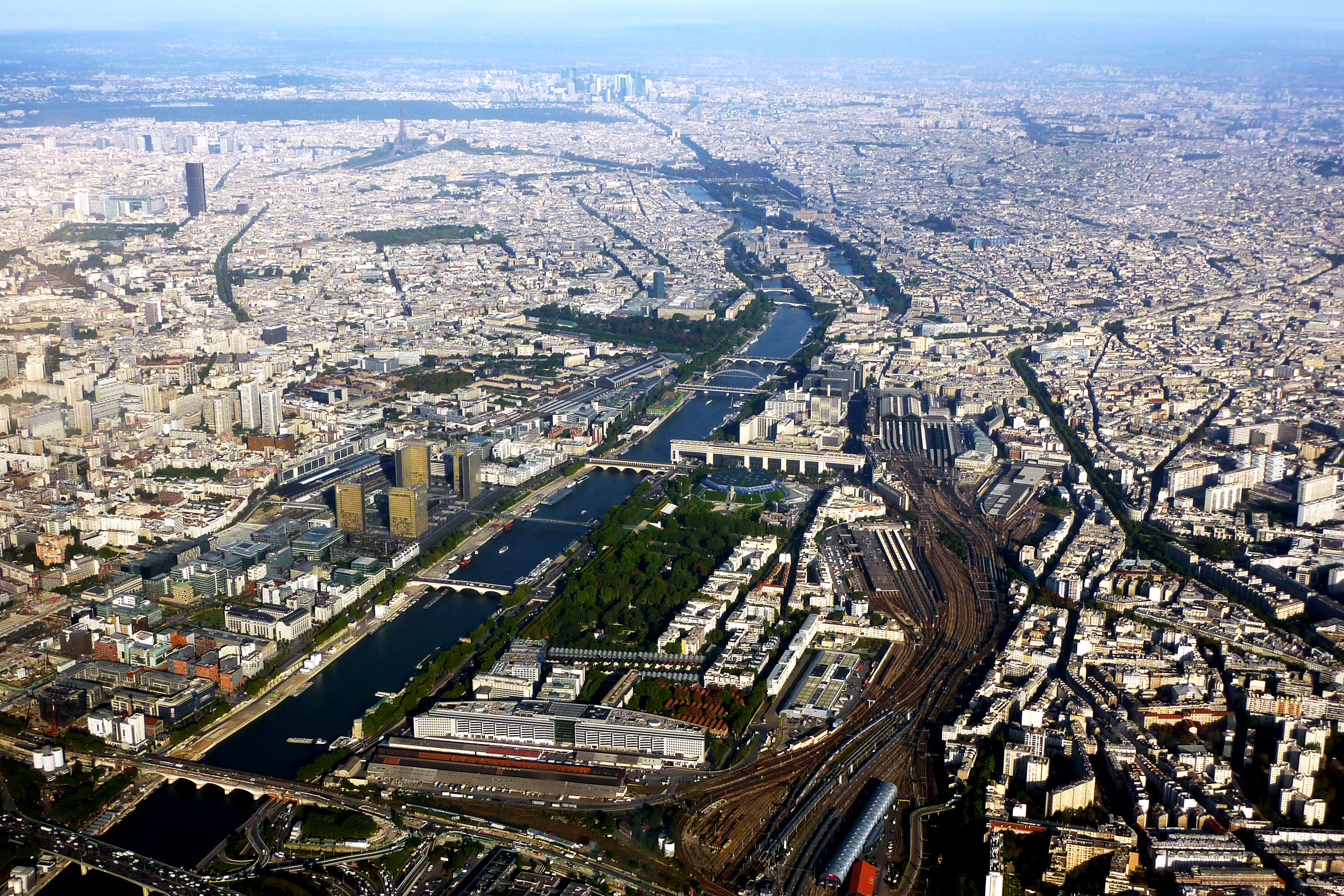
- The Seine in Paris

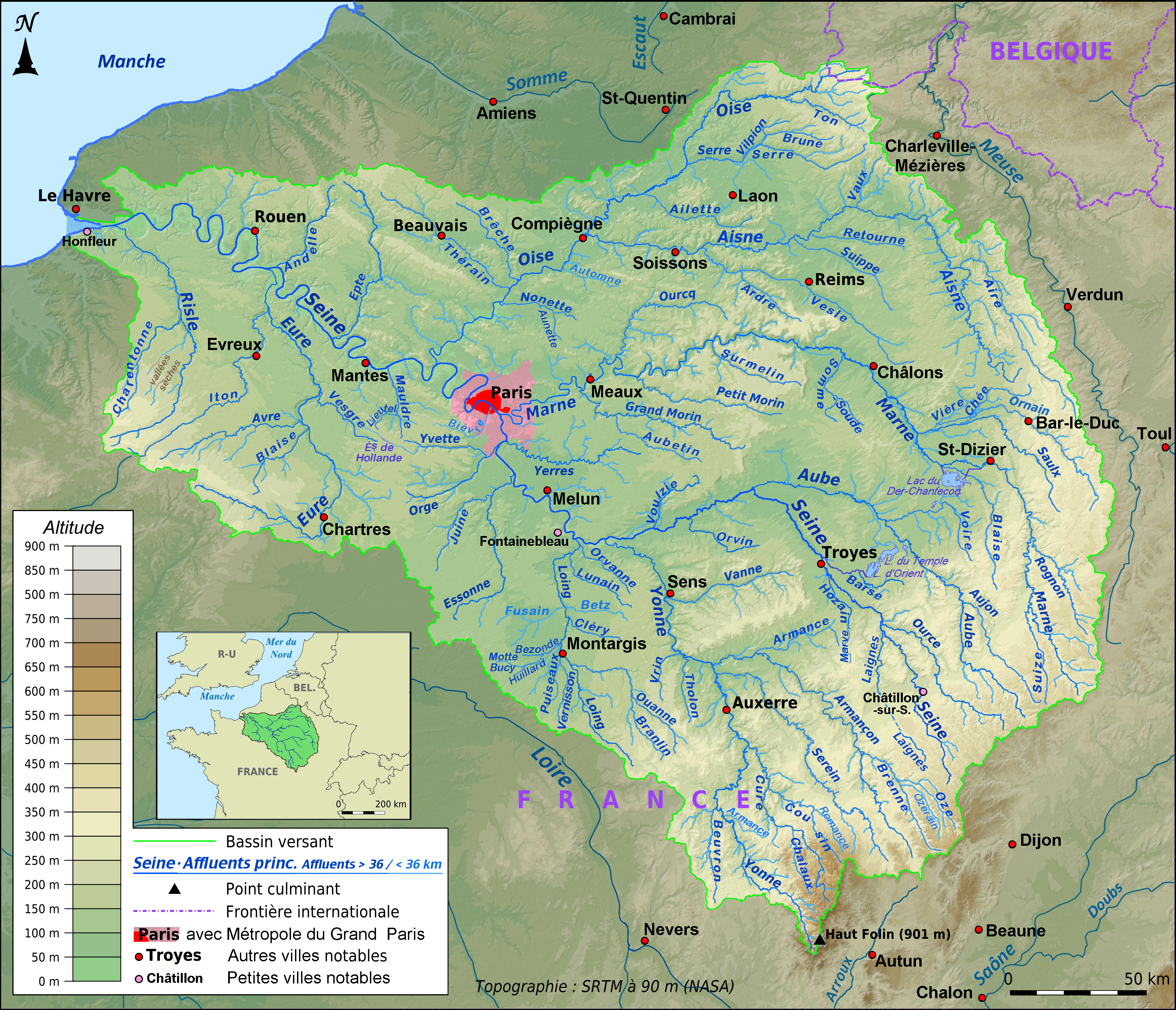
- Topographic map of the Seine basin
- Native name: la Seine (French)

Location
- Country: France

Physical characteristics
- Source
  - location: Source-Seine
- Mouth: English Channel (French: la Manche)
  - location: Le Havre/Honfleur
  - coordinates: 49°26′02″N 0°12′24″E
  - elevation: 0 m (0 ft)
- Length: 777 km (483 mi)
- Basin size: 79,000 km^{2} (31,000 sq mi)
- Discharge
  - location: Le Havre
  - average: 560 m^{3}/s (20,000 cu ft/s)

Basin features
- River system: Seine basin
- Tributaries
  - left: Yonne, Loing, Eure, Risle
  - right: Ource, Aube, Marne, Oise, Epte

The Seine (/seɪn, sɛn/ sayn, sen; French: [sɛn]) is a 777-kilometre-long (483 mi) river in northern France. Its drainage basin is in the Paris Basin (a geological relative lowland) covering most of northern France. It rises at Source-Seine, 30 kilometres (19 mi) northwest of Dijon in northeastern France in the Langres plateau, flowing through Paris and into the English Channel at Le Havre (and Honfleur on the left bank). It is navigable by ocean-going vessels as far as Rouen, 120 kilometres (75 mi) from the sea. Over 60 percent of its length, as far as Burgundy, is negotiable by large barges and most tour boats, and nearly its whole length is available for recreational boating; excursion boats offer sightseeing tours of the river banks in the capital city, Paris.

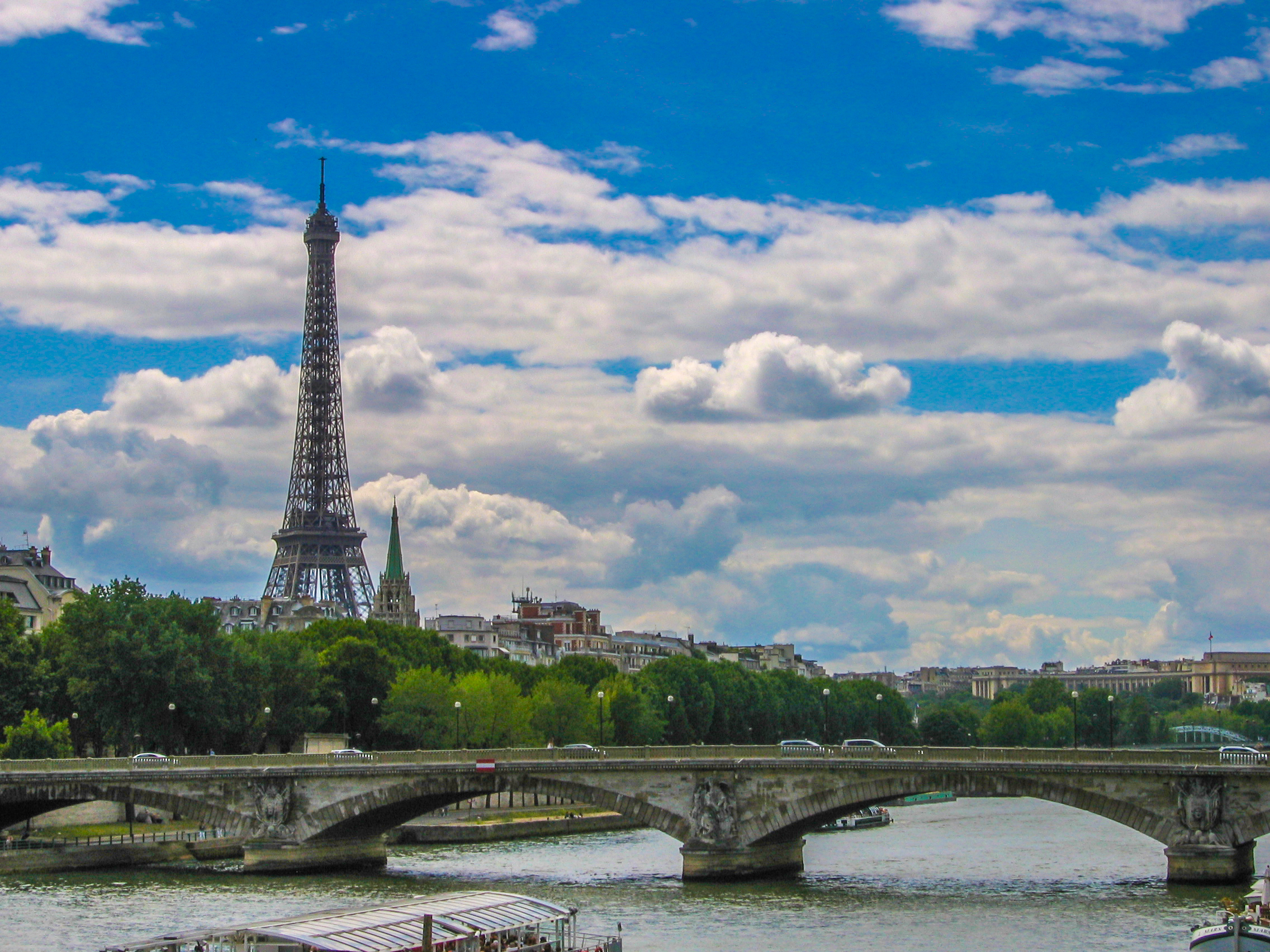
View over the Seine in Paris, Pont des Invalides in the foreground, Eiffel tower in the background

There are 37 bridges in Paris across the Seine (the most famous of which are the Pont Alexandre III and the Pont Neuf) and dozens more outside the city.

== River sources ==
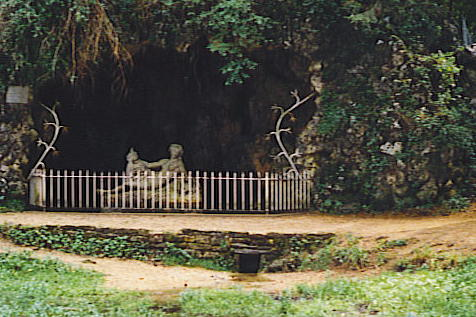
The source of the Seine

The Seine rises in the commune of Source-Seine, about 30 kilometres (19 mi) northwest of Dijon. The source has been owned by the city of Paris since 1864. A number of closely associated small ditches or depressions provide the source waters, with an artificial grotto laid out to highlight and contain a deemed main source. The grotto includes a statue of a nymph, a dog, and a dragon. On the same site are the buried remains of a Gallo-Roman temple. Small statues of the dea Sequana "Seine goddess" and other ex-votos found at the same place are now exhibited in the Dijon archaeological museum.

== Course ==
The Seine can artificially be divided into five parts:

- the Petite Seine, "Small Seine" from the sources to Montereau-Fault-Yonne
- the Haute Seine, "Upper Seine" from Montereau-Fault-Yonne to Paris
- the Traversée de Paris, "the Paris waterway"
- the Basse Seine, "Lower Seine" from Paris to Rouen
- the Seine maritime, "Maritime Seine" from Rouen to the English channel.

Below Rouen, the river passes through the Parc Naturel Régional des Boucles de la Seine Normande, one of France's regional nature parks.

== Navigation ==
The Seine is dredged and ocean-going vessels can dock at Rouen, 120 kilometres (75 mi) from the sea. Commercial craft (barges and push-tows) can use the river beginning at Marcilly-sur-Seine, 516 kilometres (321 mi) to its mouth.

At Paris, there are 37 bridges. The river is only 24 metres (79 ft) above sea level 446 kilometres (277 mi) from its mouth, making it slow flowing and thus easily navigable.

The Seine Maritime, 123 kilometres (76 mi) from the English Channel at Le Havre to Rouen, is the only portion of the Seine used by ocean-going craft. The tidal section of the Seine Maritime is followed by a canalized section (Basse Seine) with four large multiple locks until the mouth of the Oise at Conflans-Sainte-Honorine (170 km [110 mi]). Smaller locks at Bougival and at Suresnes lift the vessels to the level of the river in Paris, where the junction with the Canal Saint-Martin is located. The distance from the mouth of the Oise is 72 km (45 mi).

The Haute Seine, from Paris to Montereau-Fault-Yonne, is 98 km (61 mi) long and has 8 locks. At Charenton-le-Pont is the mouth of the Marne. Upstream from Paris seven locks ensure navigation to Saint Mammès, where the Loing mouth is situated. Through an eighth lock the river Yonne is reached at Montereau-Fault-Yonne. From the mouth of the Yonne, larger ships can continue upstream to Nogent-sur-Seine (48 km [30 mi], 7 locks). From there on, the river is navigable only by small craft to Marcilly-sur-Seine (19 km [12 mi], 4 locks). At Marcilly-sur-Seine the 19th century Canal de la Haute-Seine used to allow vessels to continue all the way to Troyes. This canal has been abandoned since 1957.

The Seine's average depth in Paris today is approximately 9.5 meters (31 feet). Until locks were installed to raise the level in the 1800s, the river was much shallower within the city, and consisted of a small channel of continuous flow bordered by sandy banks (depicted in many illustrations of the period). Today the depth is tightly controlled and the entire width of the river between the built-up banks on either side is normally filled with water. The average flow of the river is very low, only a few cubic metres per second, but much higher flows are possible during periods of heavy runoff.

=== Dredging ===
Dredging in the 1960s mostly eliminated tidal bores on the lower river, known in French as "le mascaret."

== Dams and flood control ==
Four large storage reservoirs have been built since 1950 on the Seine as well as its tributaries Yonne, Marne, and Aube. These help in maintaining a constant level for the river through the city, but cannot prevent significant increases in river level during periods of extreme runoff. The dams are Lac d’Orient, Lac des Settons, Lake Der-Chantecoq, and Auzon-Temple and Amance, respectively.

=== Flooding ===
A very severe period of high water in January 1910 resulted in extensive flooding throughout the city of Paris. The Seine again rose to threatening levels in 1924, 1955, 1982, 1999–2000, June 2016, and January 2018. After a first-level flood alert in 2003, about 100,000 works of art were moved out of Paris, the largest relocation of art since World War II. Much of the art in Paris is kept in underground storage rooms that would have been flooded.

A 2002 report by the French government stated the worst-case Seine flood scenario would cost 10 billion euros and cut telephone service for a million Parisians, leaving 200,000 without electricity and 100,000 without gas.

=== 2018 Paris flood ===
In January 2018 the Seine again flooded, reaching a flood level of 5.84 metres (19 ft 2 in) on 29 January. An official warning was issued on 24 January that heavy rainfall was likely to cause the river to flood. By 27 January, the river was rising. The Deputy Mayor of Paris Colombe Brossel warned that the heavy rain was caused by climate change. She added that "We have to understand that climatic change is not a word, it's a reality."

== Watershed ==
The basin area, including a part of Belgium, is 78,910 square kilometres (30,470 mi^{2}), 2 percent of which is forest and 78 percent cultivated land. In addition to Paris, three other cities with a population over 100,000 are in the Seine watershed: Le Havre at the estuary, Rouen in the Seine valley and Reims at the northern limit—with an annual urban growth rate of 0.2 percent. The population density is 201 per square kilometer.

=== Tributaries ===
Tributaries of the Seine are, from source to mouth:

- Ource (right)
- Barse (right)
- Aube (right)
- Yonne (left)
- Loing (left)
- Almont (right)
- Essonne (left)
- Orge (left)
- Yerres (right)
- Marne (right)
- Bièvre (left)
- Oise (right)
- Aubette de Meulan (right)
- Mauldre (left)
- Vaucouleurs (left)
- Epte (right)
- Andelle (right)
- Eure (left)
- Oison (left)
- Aubette (right)
- Cailly (right)
- Austreberthe (right)
- Commerce (right)
- Risle (left)
- Lézarde (right)

== Water quality ==
Due to concentrated levels of industry, agriculture and urban populations of Paris and its surroundings, the Seine-Normandy watershed experiences the highest human impacts of any hydrographic basin in France. Compared to most other large European rivers, the ability of the Seine to dilute urban sewage and farmland runoff is very low. Low oxygen levels, high concentrations of ammonia, nitrites and faecal bacteria, extending from Paris to the estuary, have been issues for over a century. The advent of nitrogenous fertilizers in the 1960s marked an upturn in agricultural pollution due to land use changes that had previously scaled with population growth. Heavy industries near Paris and along the Oise River discharged virtually untreated wastewaters from the turn of the 19th century, causing concentrations of toxins in the river that were ignored until the late 1980s. Major French laws to address water quality were passed in 1898, 1964, 1996, and 2006.

At the beginning of the 20th century, most domestic sewage was used as fertilizer for nearby croplands. As populations grew, the agricultural capacity to absorb those wastewaters was exceeded. Large-scale construction of waste water treatment plants (WWTPs) began in 1940 to meet demand; however, by 1970, about 60% of urban sewage was allowed to flow into the river untreated. The resulting oxygen depletion reduced the number of fish species to three. Measures taken in the early 2000s due to the Water Framework Directive led to significant reductions of organic carbon, phosphorus and ammonium, which in turn decreased the occurrence and severity of phytoplankton blooms. Continued WWTP construction and new treatment methods improved environmental conditions. In 2009, it was announced that Atlantic salmon had returned to the Seine. By the early 2020s, the number of fish species near Paris had rebounded to 32.

Periodically the sewage systems of Paris experience a failure known as sanitary sewer overflow, often in periods of high rainfall. Under these conditions, untreated residential and industrial sewage is discharged into the Seine to prevent backflow. This is due in large part to Paris's "single system" drainage scheme dating from the 19th century, which combines street runoff and sewage. The resulting oxygen deficit is principally caused by allochthonous bacteria larger than one micrometre in size. The specific activity of these sewage bacteria is typically three to four times greater than that of the autochthonous (background) bacterial population. Heavy metal concentrations in the Seine are relatively high. The pH level of the Seine at Pont Neuf has been measured to be 8.46. Despite this, the water quality has improved significantly over what several historians at various times in the past called an "open sewer".

In 1988, then-mayor of Paris and future president Jacques Chirac first called for the lifting of a swimming ban that had been in place since 1923 due to polluted waters. In 2018, a €1.4 billion ($1.55 billion) cleanup programme called the "Swimming Plan" was launched with the aim of making the river safe to use for the 2024 Summer Olympics. The project included constructing a basin to store rainwater, which would then be slowly released into the sewer system, preventing overflow. Plans also call for several public swimming areas to be made available by 2025, bringing an end to a century-old ban. These efforts have produced mixed results, as E. coli levels have often been found to be far higher than what is safe to swim in, though this could depend on the season. At the same time, the fish population in the river has surged, from just two species to over 30. To demonstrate the river's improved cleanliness, Mayor Anne Hidalgo and President Emmanuel Macron both pledged to take a swim in the waters, and Hidalgo did so on July 17, 2024.

During the Summer Olympics, the date of the triathlon was postponed due to water quality issues, as the earlier rainstorm during the opening ceremony had driven some untreated rainwater back into the Seine. However, the triathlon proceeded the following day, after testing found the water quality to be sufficient for swimming.

In July 2025, the Seine was reopened for swimming after a ban lasting almost 100 years.

During the European heatwaves in 2025 and in 2026, many people did so.

== History ==
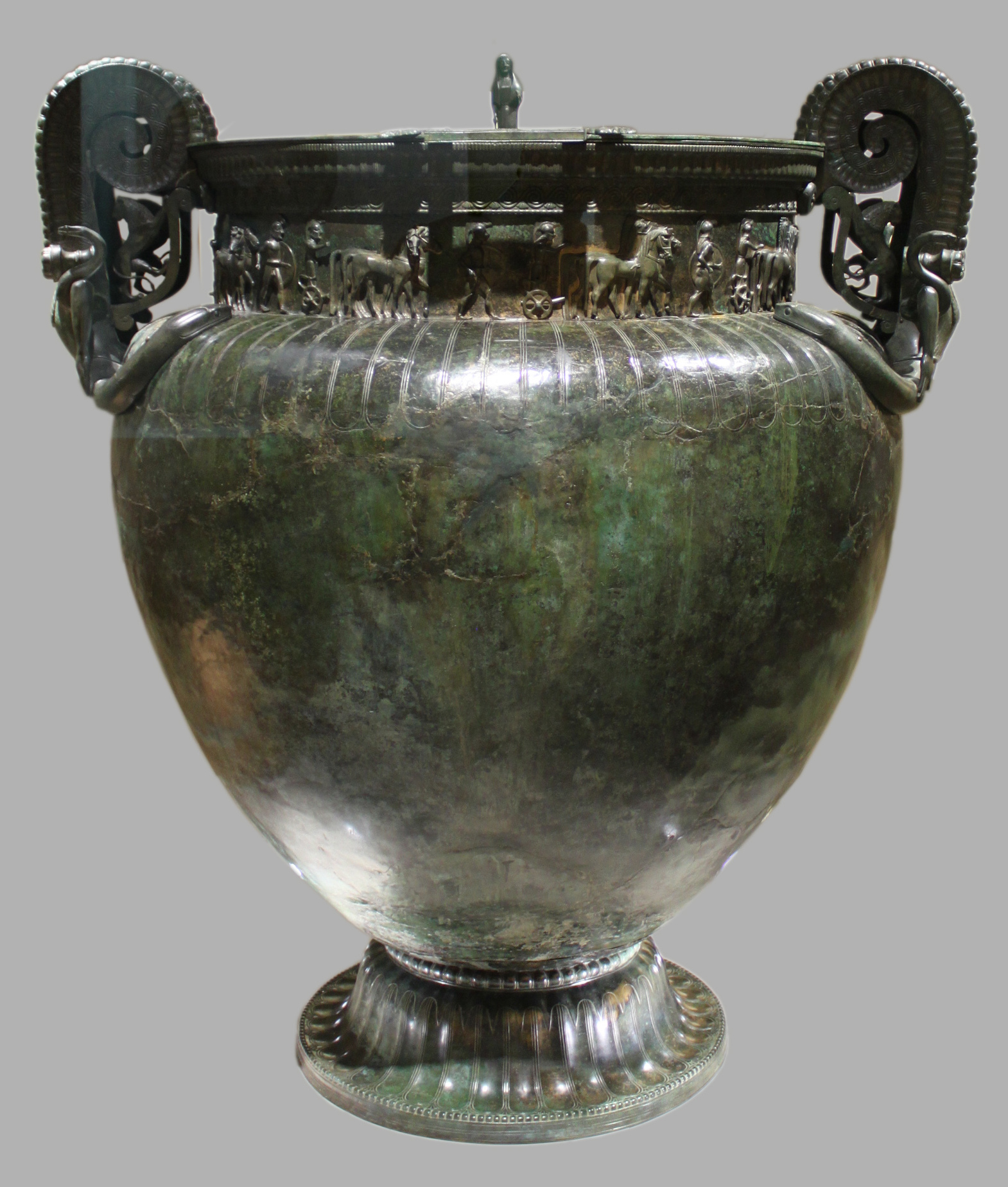
The gigantic Cratère de Vix - at 1.64 meters high, the largest bronze vessel of all antiquity, c. 500 BC

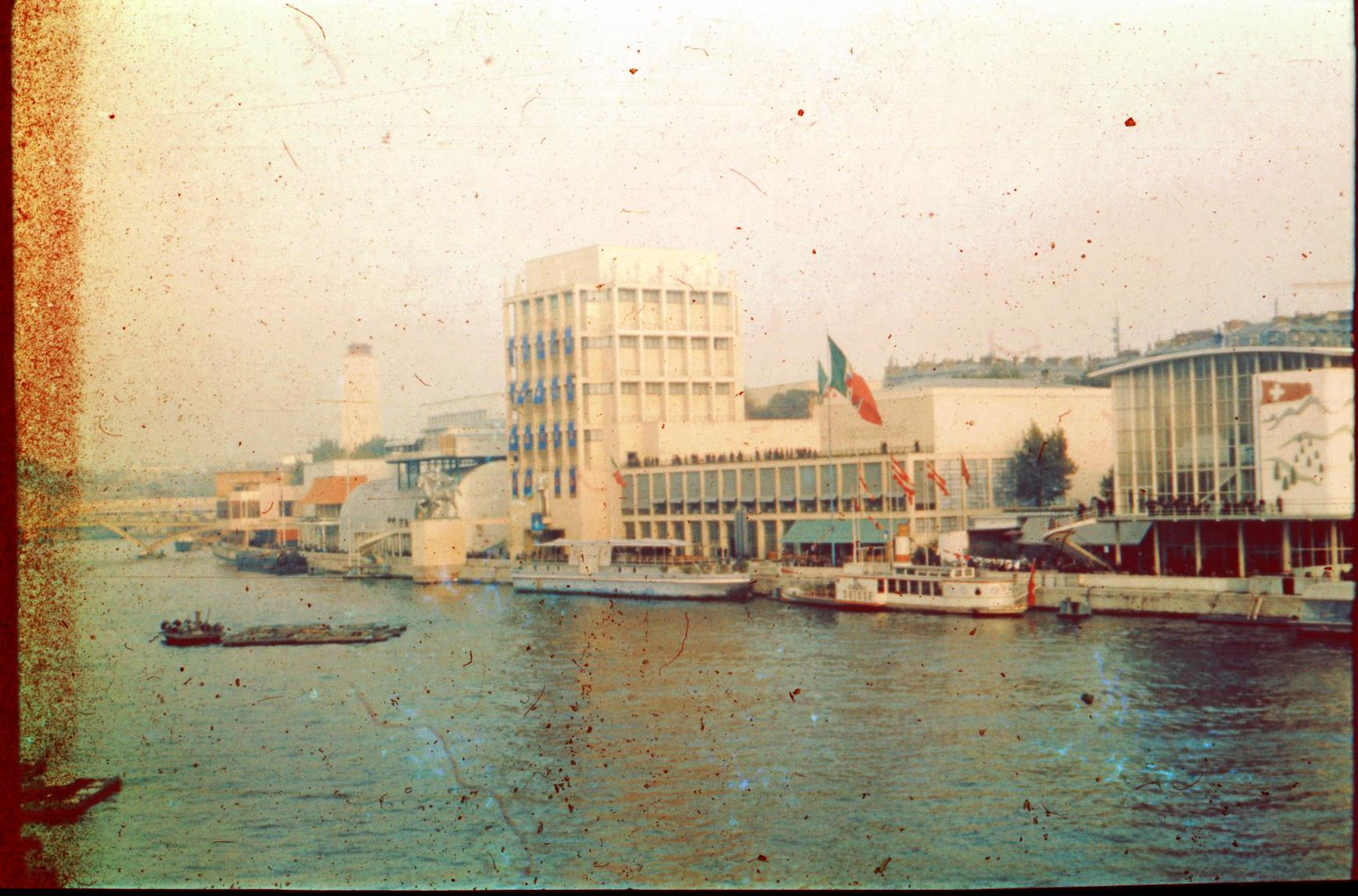
The Seine in Paris during the World Expo in 1937

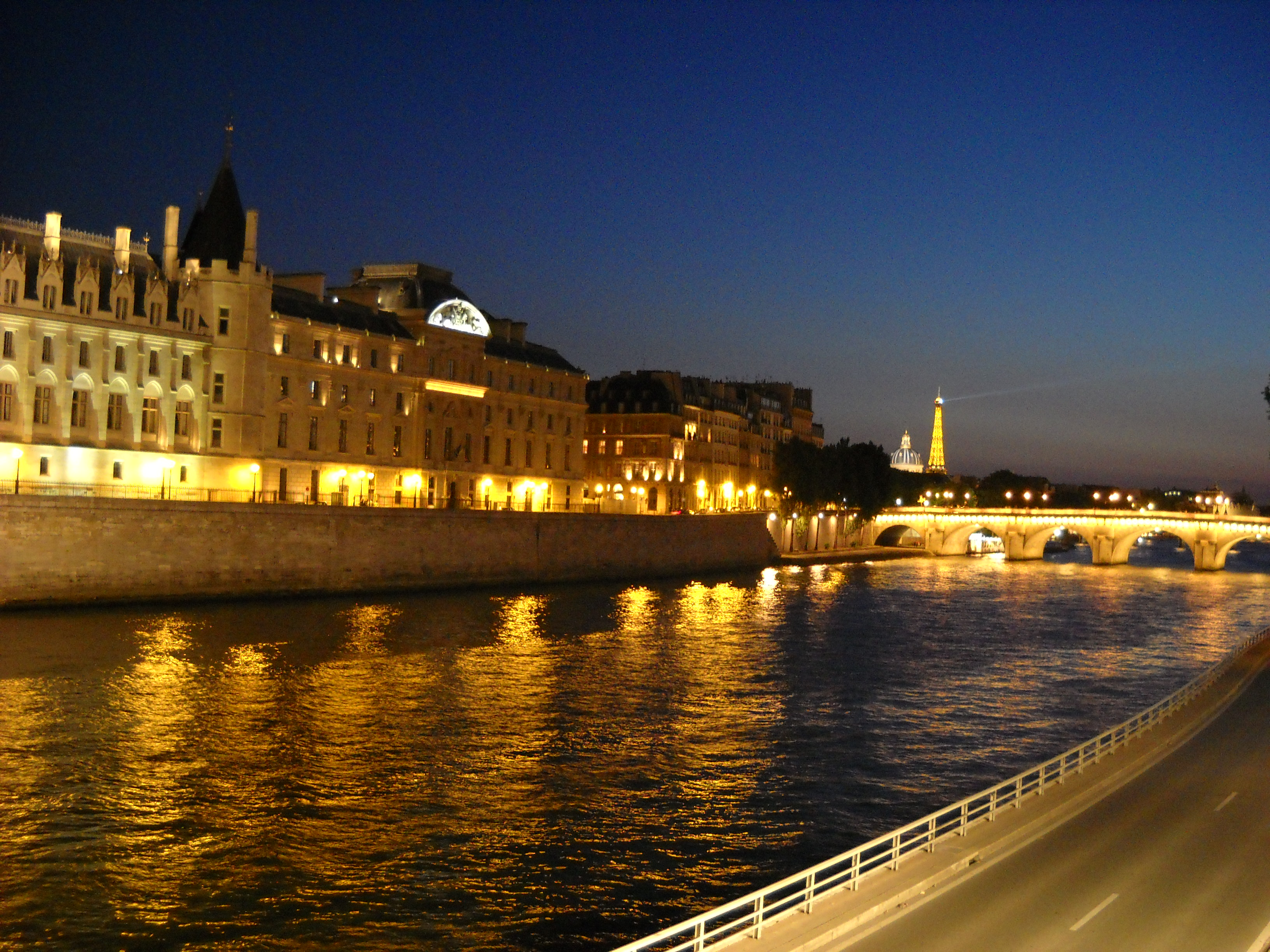
The Seine and Eiffel Tower

The name Seine comes from Gaulish Sēquana, from the Celtic Gallo-Roman goddess of the river, as offerings for her were found at the source. Sometimes it is incorrectly associated with Latin sequor 'follow', but the Celtic word rather seems to derive from the same root as English sea, namely Proto-Indo-European *seik^{w}-, signifying 'to flow' or 'to pour forth'.

On 28 or 29 March 845, an army of Vikings led by a chieftain named Reginherus, which is possibly another name for Ragnar Lothbrok, sailed up the River Seine with siege towers and sacked Paris.

On 25 November 885, another Viking expedition led by Rollo traveled up the River Seine to attack Paris again.

In March 1314, King Philip IV of France had Jacques de Molay, last Grand Master of the Knights Templar, burned on a scaffold on an island in the River Seine in front of Notre Dame de Paris.

Following the burning of Joan of Arc in 1431, her ashes were thrown into the Seine from the medieval stone Mathilde Bridge at Rouen, though unsupported counter-claims persist.

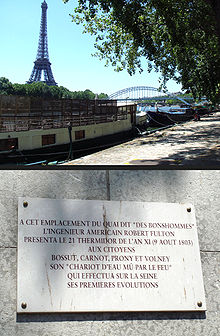
Plaque commemorating Robert Fulton's first successful trial of the steamboat in the Seine

On 9 August 1803, Robert Fulton, American painter and marine engineer, made his first successful test of his steamboat in the Seine beside the Tuileries Garden. Having a length of sixty-six feet and an eight-foot beam Fulton's steamboat attained speeds of three to four miles per hour against the Seine's current.

Reaching the Seine was one of the original objectives of Operation Overlord, during the Second World War, in 1944. The Allies' intention was to reach the Seine by 90 days after D-Day. That objective was met. An anticipated assault crossing of the river never materialized as German resistance in France crumbled by early September 1944. However, the First Canadian Army did encounter resistance immediately west of the Seine and fighting occurred in the Forêt de la Londe as Allied troops attempted to cut off the escape across the river of parts of the German 7th Army in the closing phases of the Battle of Normandy.

Some of the Algerian victims of the 1961 Paris massacre drowned in the Seine after being thrown by French policemen from the Pont Saint-Michel and other locations in Paris.

== At the Olympics ==
=== 1900 and 1924 Summer Olympics ===
At the 1900 Summer Olympics, the river hosted the rowing, swimming, and water polo events. Twenty-four years later, it hosted the rowing events again at Bassin d'Argenteuil, along the Seine north of Paris.

=== 2024 Summer Olympics ===
More than a century later, during the 2024 Summer Olympics, the Seine hosted a boat parade with boats for each national delegation during the opening ceremony.

The river was also the site of the men's and women's event for marathon swimming, as well as the swimming portion of the triathlon. Although swimming in the Seine had been banned since 1923, a €1.4 billion cleanup effort by the French government sought to reduce bacterial levels in the river to those safe for swimming. During the Olympics, daily tests of the water quality were taken to determine if it was safe for swimming; this caused the triathlon to be delayed by a day, before being allowed to proceed on July 31. A few of the triathletes who swam in the river became sick afterwards, though it was not clear if the Seine water was the cause.

== World Heritage Sites ==
In 1991 (and 2024), UNESCO added the banks of the Seine in Paris—the Rive Gauche and Rive Droite—to its list of World Heritage Sites in Europe.

Boundaries of the UNESCO World Heritage Site "Paris, Banks of the Seine" since 2024

== In art ==
During the 19th and the 20th centuries in particular the Seine inspired many artists, including:

- Frédéric Bazille
- Maurice Boitel
- Richard Parkes Bonington
- Eugène Boudin
- Camille Corot
- Charles-François Daubigny
- Guy Debord
- Raoul Dufy
- Othon Friesz
- Carl Fredrik Hill
- Eugène Isabey
- Johan Jongkind
- Raimond Lecourt
- Albert Marquet
- Henri Matisse
- Claude Monet
- Luis F. Pinzón
- Camille Pissarro
- Emilio Grau Sala
- Gaston Sébire
- Georges Seurat
- Alfred Sisley
- Constant Troyon
- J. M. W. Turner
- Félix Vallotton
- Édouard Vuillard
- Pierre-Auguste Renoir

A song "La Seine" by Flavien Monod and Guy Lafarge was written in 1948.

Josephine Baker also recorded a song called "La Seine"

Another song titled "La Seine", by Vanessa Paradis featuring Matthieu Chedid, formed part of the original soundtrack for the 2011 film A Monster in Paris.

The Seine features prominently in ABBA's 1980 song "Our Last Summer", written by Benny Andersson and Björn Ulvaeus.

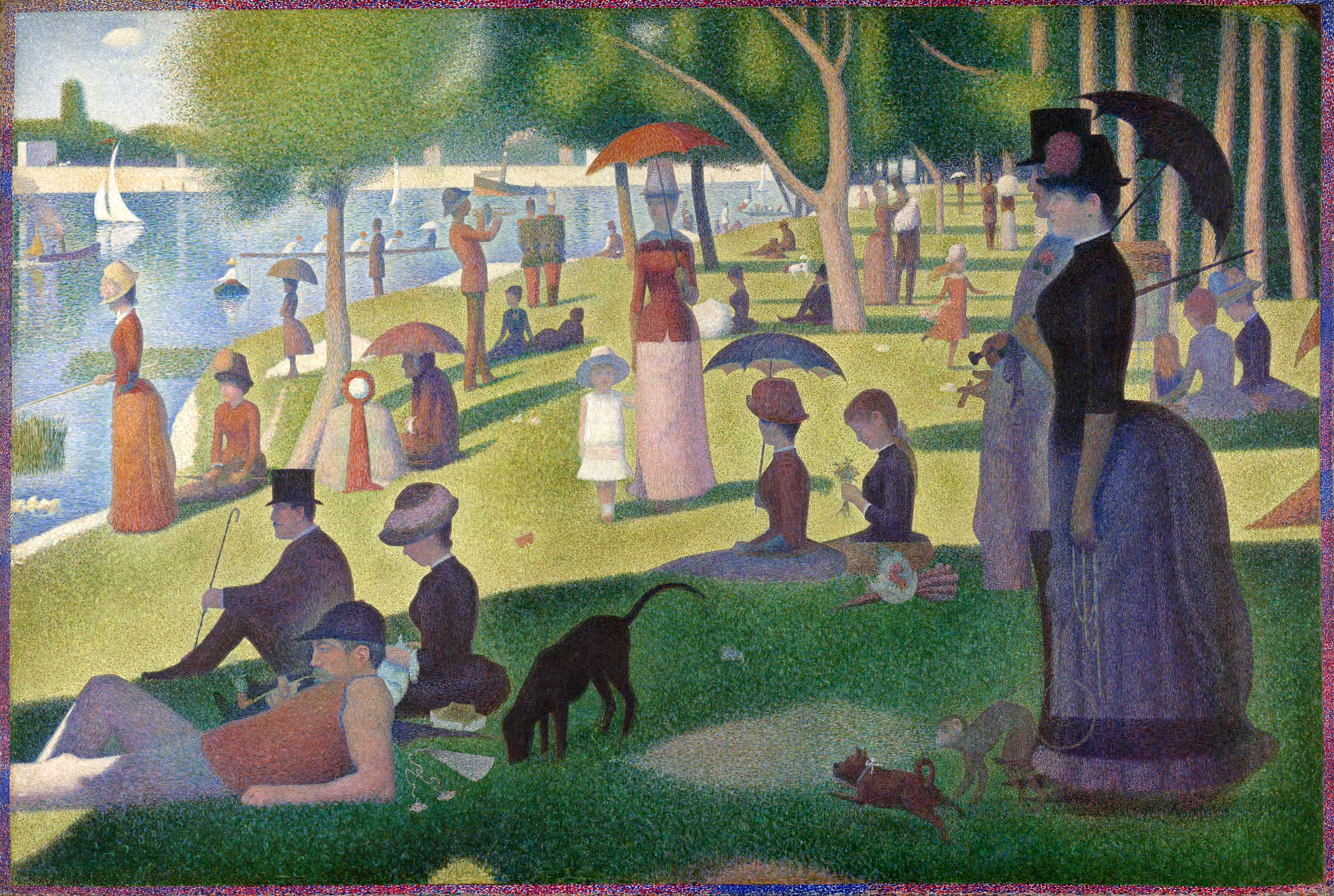
Georges Seurat's A Sunday Afternoon on the Island of La Grande Jatte (1884–1886) is set on an island in the Seine.

Carl Fredrik Hill, French River Landscape, Bois-le-Roi (1877)

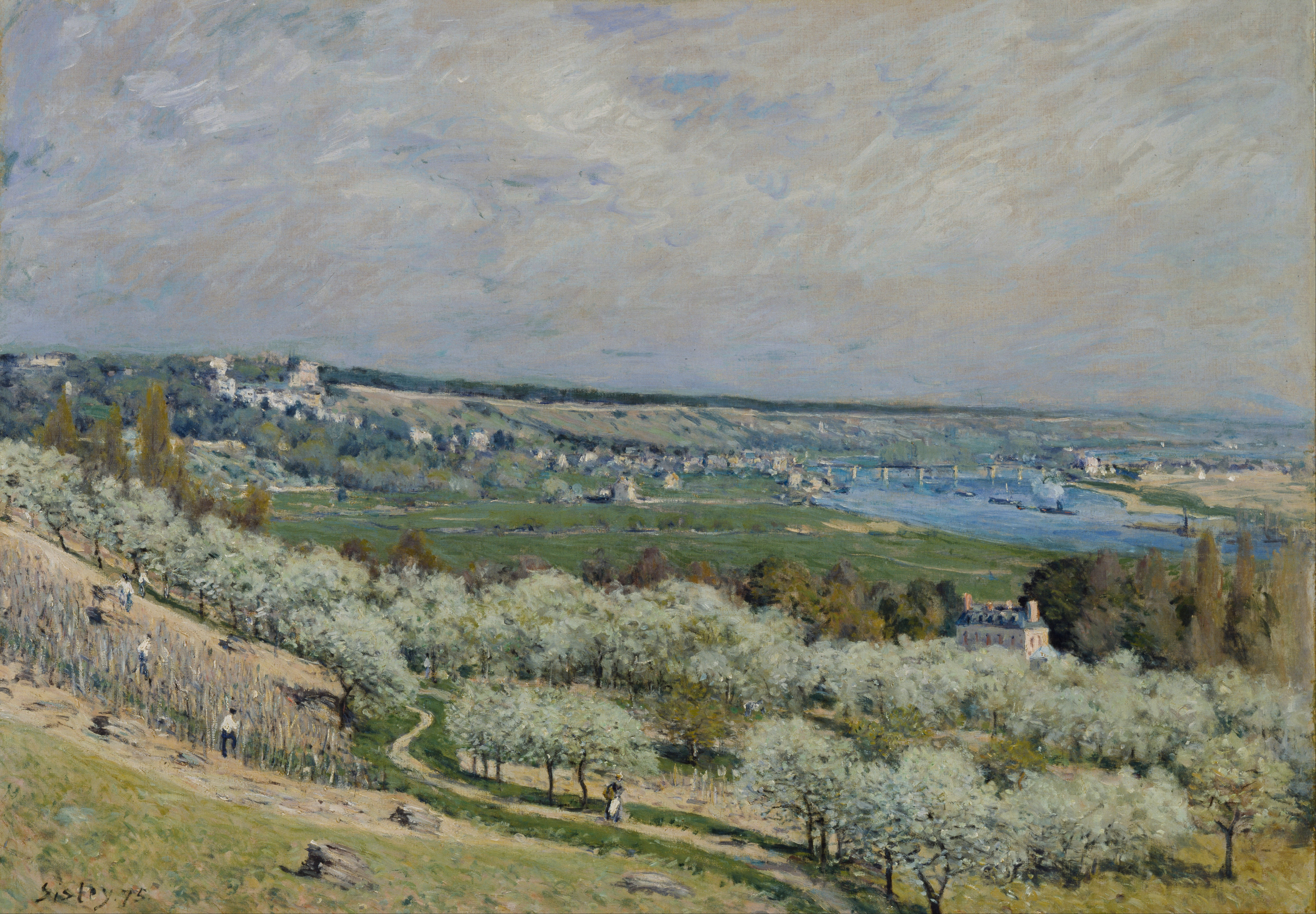
Alfred Sisley, The Terrace at Saint-Germain, Spring (1875) in the Walters Art Museum gives a panoramic view of the Seine river valley.

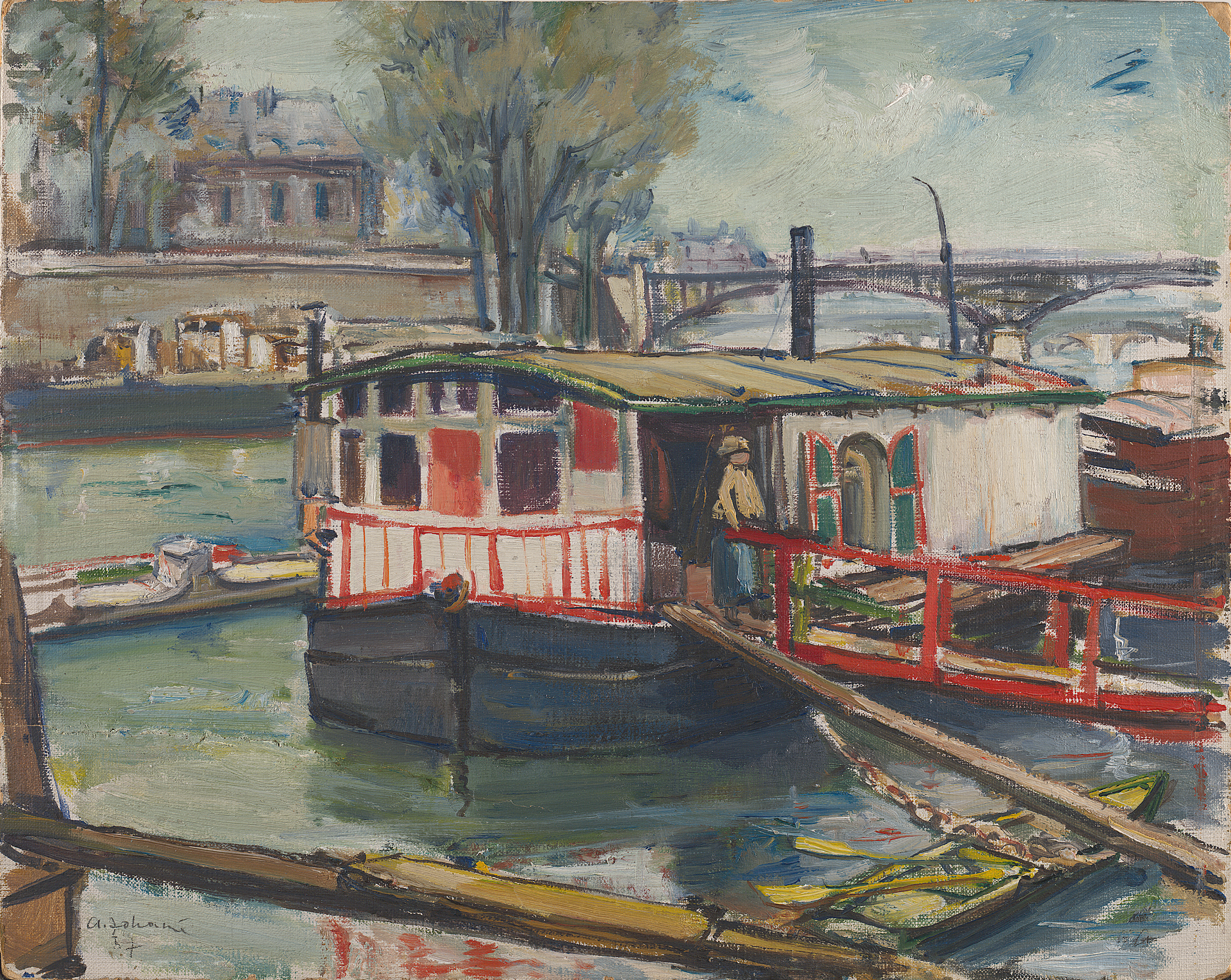
Washhouses on Seine (1937) by Andrus Johani

== See also ==
- List of crossings of the Seine
- EPTB Seine Grands Lacs
