= André Lefèvre (1717–1768) =

French jurist and man of letters

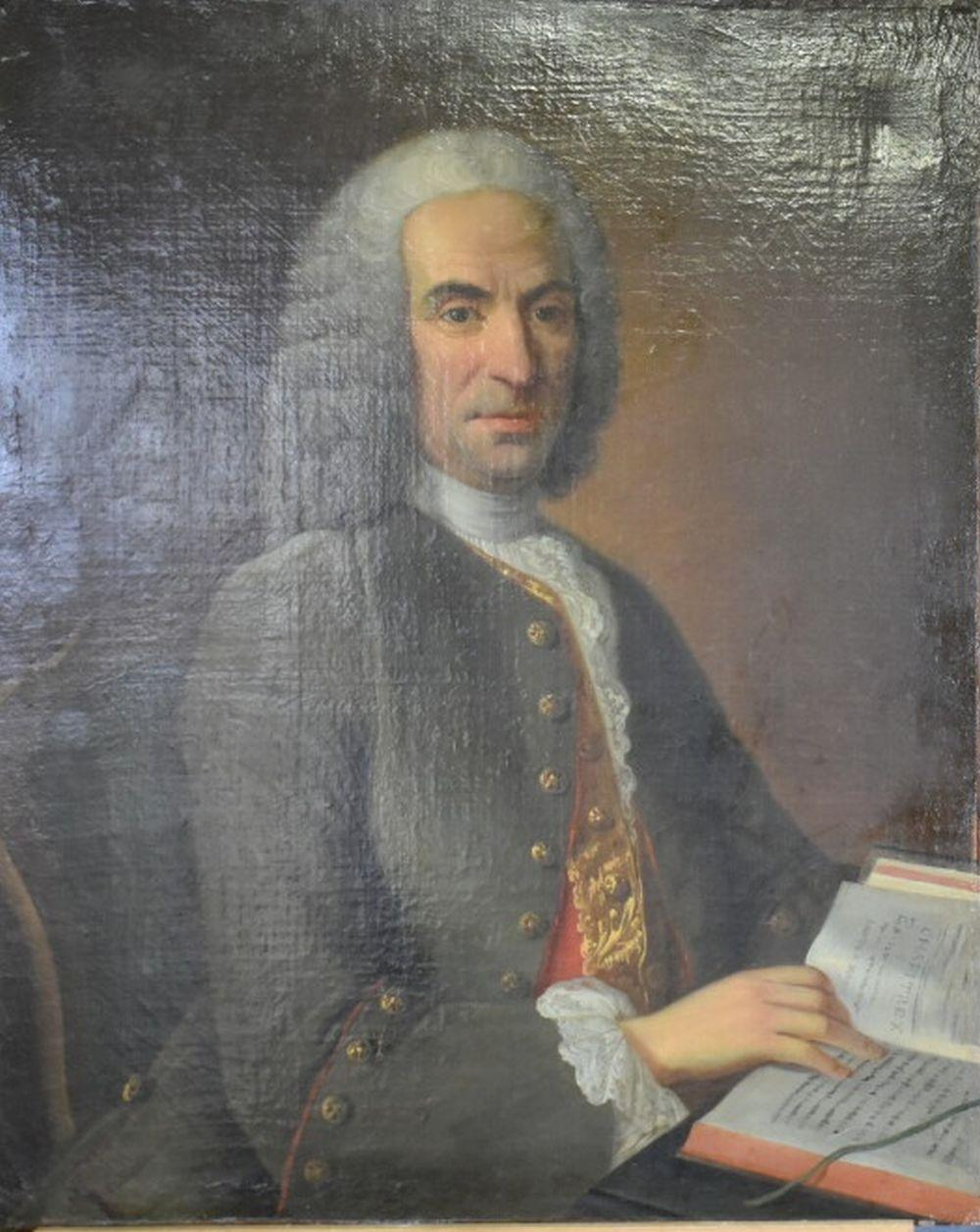
- Born: 4 May 1718; Troyes
- Died: 25 February 1768; Paris

André Lefèvre (4 May 1718 – 25 February 1768) was an 18th-century French jurist and man of letters. A lawyer from 1739, Lefèvre wrote poetry and essays. He went to Paris and became tutor to the children of large families, especially the descendants of the house of Rochefoucauld.

He contributed the articles « gouverneur », « faiblesse », « folie » and « gouvernante », to the Encyclopédie by Diderot and d'Alembert

== Works ==
- 1744: Mémoires de l’Académie des sciences de Troyes en Champagne. Liège
- 1748: Pot-Pourri.
- 1767: Dialogue entre un curé et son filleul.

== Sources ==
- Pierre Larousse, Grand Dictionnaire universel du XIXe, vol. 10, Paris, Administration du grand Dictionnaire universel, (p. 1477).
- John Lough, The Encyclopédie. Slatkine, Geneva (1971)(p. 51)
