= Troyes =

Prefecture and commune in Grand Est, France

- Prefecture and commune
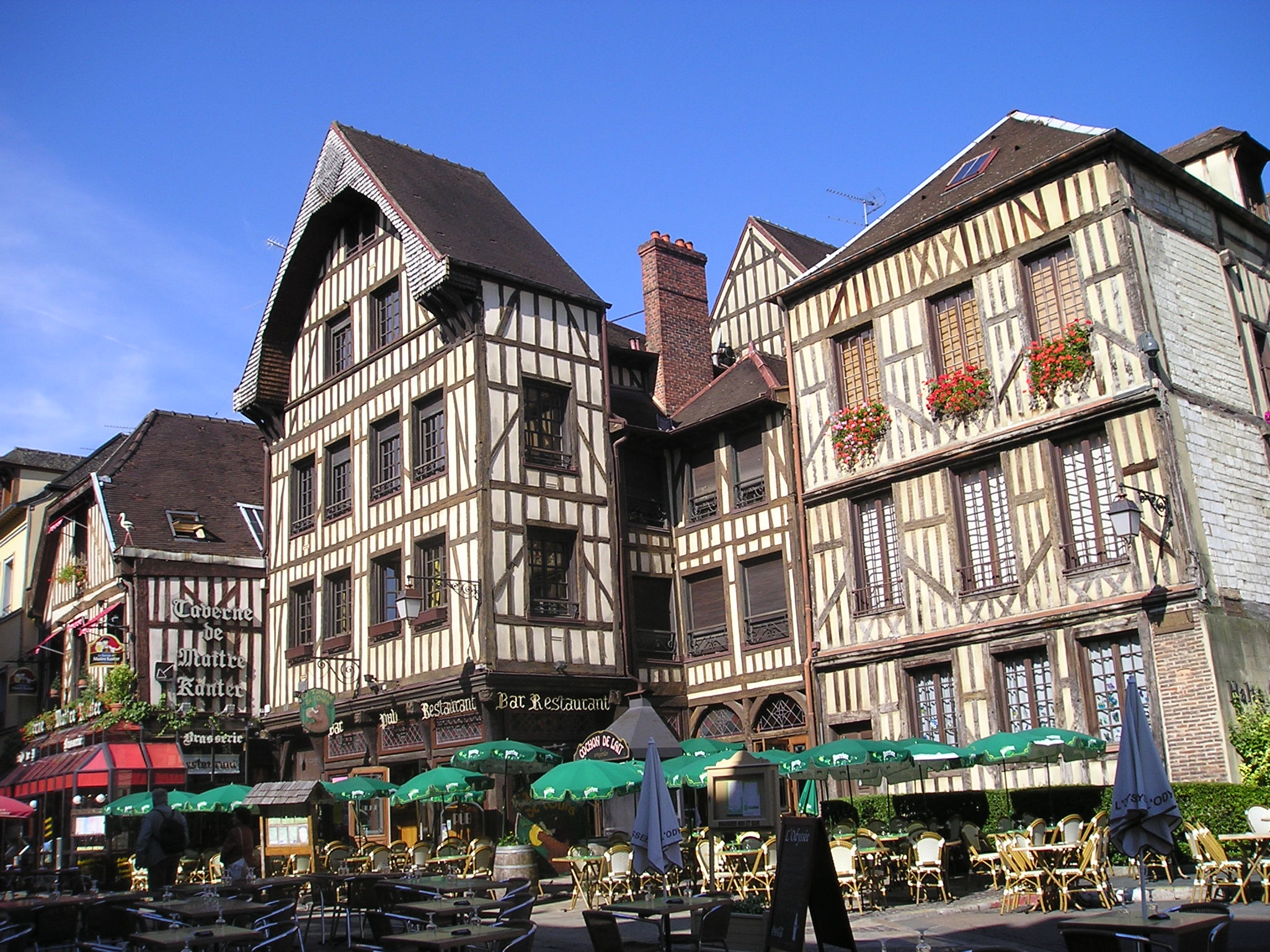
- Buildings in the historic quarter of Troyes

- Flag Coat of arms
- Location of Troyes
- Location within France Location within Grand Est
- Coordinates: 48°17′59″N 4°04′45″E
- Country: France
- Region: Grand Est
- Department: Aube
- Arrondissement: Troyes
- Canton: Troyes-1; Troyes-2; Troyes-3; Troyes-4; Troyes-5
- Intercommunality: CA Troyes Champagne Métropole

Government
  - Mayor (2026–32): François Baroin (LR)
- Area^{1}: 13.2 km^{2} (5.1 sq mi)
- Elevation: 118 m (387 ft)
- Highest elevation: 126 m (413 ft)
- Lowest elevation: 100 m (330 ft)
- Population (2023): 62,088
  - Density: 4,700/km^{2} (12,200/sq mi)
- Time zone: UTC+01:00 (CET)
  - Summer (DST): UTC+02:00 (CEST)
- INSEE/Postal code: 10387 /10000
- ^{1} French Land Register data, which excludes lakes, ponds, glaciers > 1 km^{2} (0.386 sq mi or 247 acres) and river estuaries.

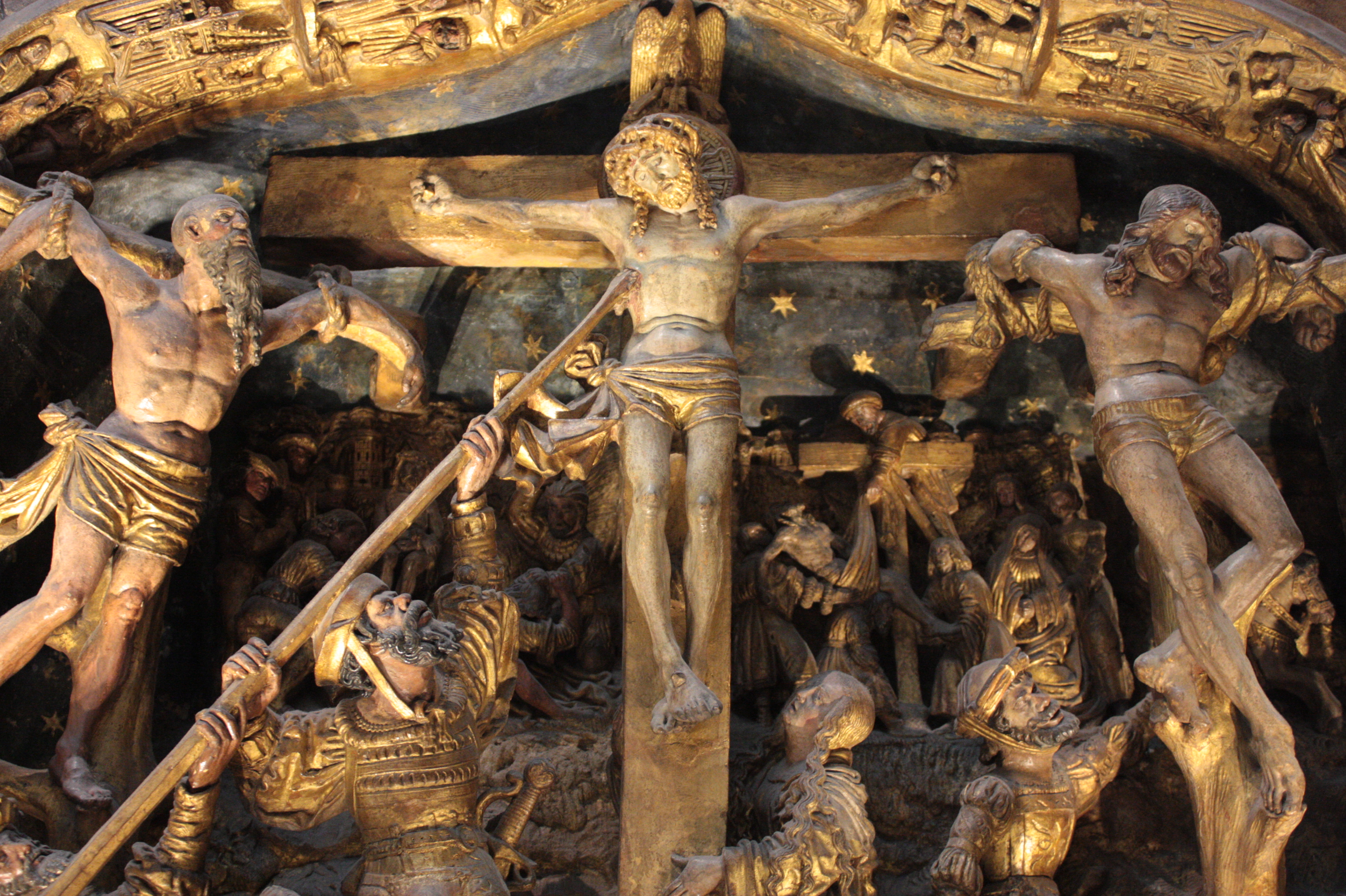
Troyes altarpiece (detail) Victoria and Albert Museum, London

Troyes (French pronunciation: [tʁwa]) is a commune and the capital of the department of Aube in the Grand Est region of northeastern France. It is located on the Seine river about 140 km (87 mi) south-east of Paris. Troyes is situated within the Champagne wine region and is near the Orient Forest Regional Natural Park.

Troyes had a population of 62,088 inhabitants in 2023. It is the center of the Communauté d'agglomération Troyes Champagne Métropole, which is home to about 175,000 inhabitants.

Troyes developed as early as the Roman era, when it was known as Augustobona Tricassium. It stood at the hub of numerous highways, primarily the Via Agrippa. The city has a rich historical past, from the Tricasses tribe to the liberation of the city on 25 August 1944 during the Second World War, including the Battle of the Catalaunian Plains, the Council of Troyes, the marriage of Henry V of England and Catherine of France, and the Champagne fairs to which merchants came from all over Christendom. The city has a rich architectural and urban heritage: many buildings are protected as historical monuments, including the half-timbered houses (mainly of the 16th century) that survived in the old town. They have contributed to Troyes being designated as a City of Art and History.

Manufacturing of textiles, from the 18th century onwards, was a chief part of Troyes' economy until the 1960s. Today, Troyes is the European capital of factory outlets and trading, and has three brand centers.

== History ==
Prehistoric evidence found in the Troyes area suggests that the settlement may have developed as early as 600 BC. Celtic grave-mounds have been found near the city, and Celtic artifacts have been excavated within the city grounds.

In the Roman era, Troyes was known as Augustobona Tricassium. Numerous highways intersected here, primarily the Via Agrippa, which led north to Reims and south to Langres, and eventually to Milan. Other Roman routes from Troyes led to Poitiers, Autun and Orléans.

It was the civitas of the Tricasses people, whom Augustus separated from the Senones. Of the Gallo-Roman city of the early Roman Empire, some scattered remains have been found, but no public monuments, other than traces of an aqueduct. By the late Empire the settlement had reduced in extent. It was referred to as Tricassium or Tricassae, the origin of French Troyes.

From the fourth century AD, the people had become Christian and the Church made the city the seat of a bishop. The legend of its bishop Lupus (Loup), who allegedly saved the city from Attila in 451 by offering himself as hostage, is hagiographic rather than historical. A disciple of Saint Lupus, Aventinus (Saint Aventin of Troyes, died 537) founded a monastery at Troyes. It was several centuries before Troyes gained importance as a medieval centre of commerce.

The Battle of the Catalaunian Plains, also called the Battle of Troyes, took place nearby in 451 AD: the Roman general Flavius Aetius and the Visigothic king Theodoric I fought against Attila.

The early cathedral occupied the site of the current one. Here Louis the Stammerer in 878 received the crown of West Francia from Pope John VIII. At the end of the ninth century, following depredations of the city by Normans, the counts of Champagne chose Troyes as their capital. It remained the capital of the Province of Champagne until the Revolution of the late eighteenth century. The Abbey of Saint-Loup developed a renowned library and scriptorium.

During the Middle Ages, Troyes functioned as an important international trading town. It was the namesake of troy weight for gold – a standard of measurement developed here. The Champagne cloth fairs and the revival of long-distance trade, together with new extension of coinage and credit, were the drivers of the medieval economy of Troyes.

In 1040, Shlomo Yitzchaki, better known as Rashi, was born in Troyes. The rabbi and philosopher, a prominent commentator on the Bible and the Talmud, established an influential school of Jewish thought in the city.

In 1285, when King Philip the Fair united Champagne to the French royal domain, the town kept a number of its traditional privileges. John the Fearless, Duke of Burgundy and ally of the English during the Hundred Years War, in 1417 worked to have Troyes designated as the capital of France. He came to an understanding with Isabeau of Bavaria, wife of King Charles VI of France, for the establishment at Troyes of a court, council, and parlement with comptroller's offices.

On 21 May 1420, the Treaty of Troyes was signed in this city, still under control of the Burgundians, by which King Henry V of England was betrothed to Catherine, daughter of Charles VI. Under the terms of the treaty, Henry V, rather than the Dauphin, was to succeed Charles as King of France. The high-water mark of Plantagenet hegemony in France was reversed in 1429 when the Dauphin (afterwards King Charles VII) and Joan of Arc re-established French control of the town of Troyes by armed conflict (Siege of Troyes).

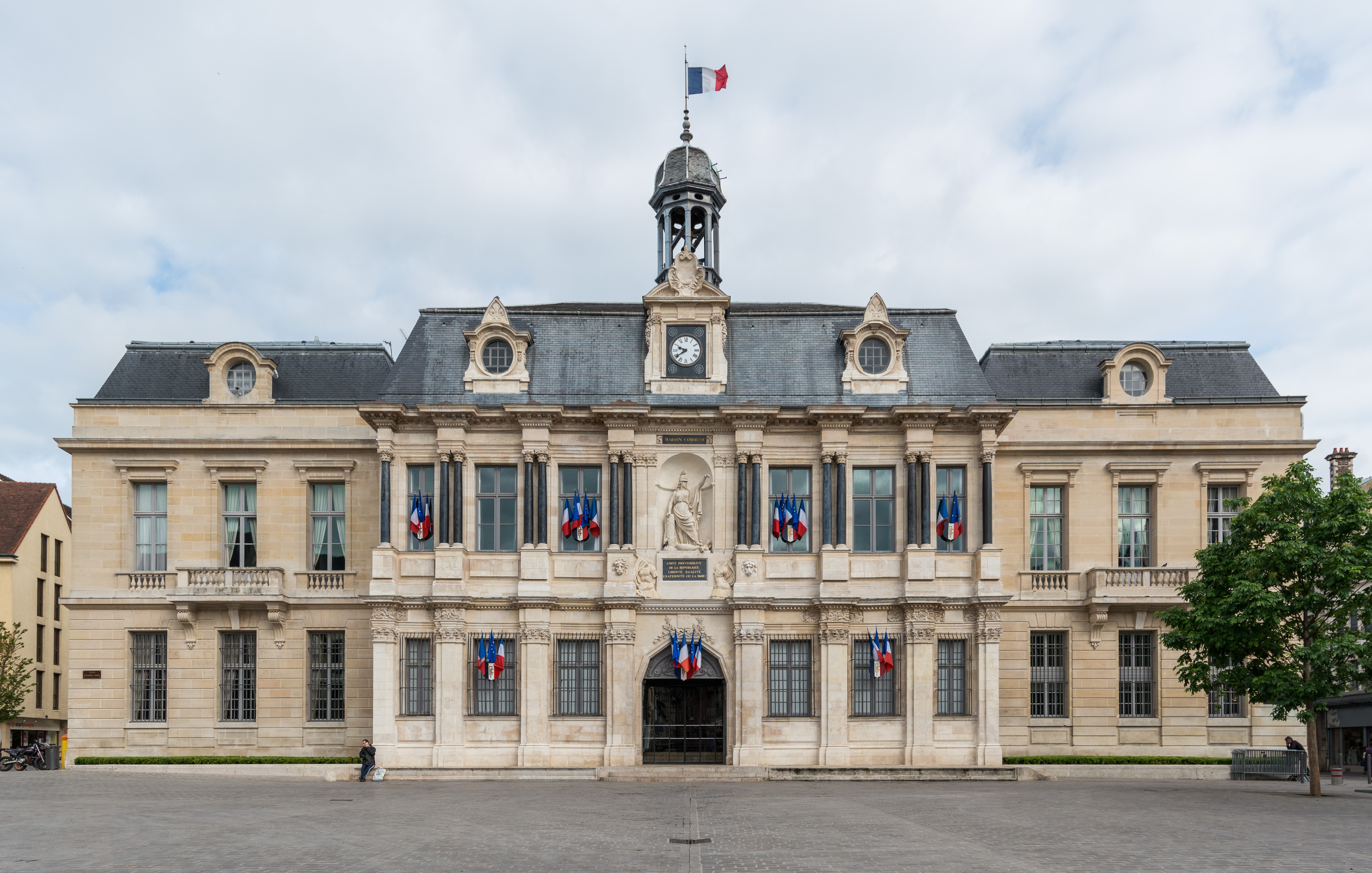
The Hôtel de Ville

The great fire of 1524 destroyed much of the medieval city, although the city had numerous canals separating sections.

During the repression of January and February 1894, the police conducted raids targeting the anarchists living there, without much success.

== Main sights ==
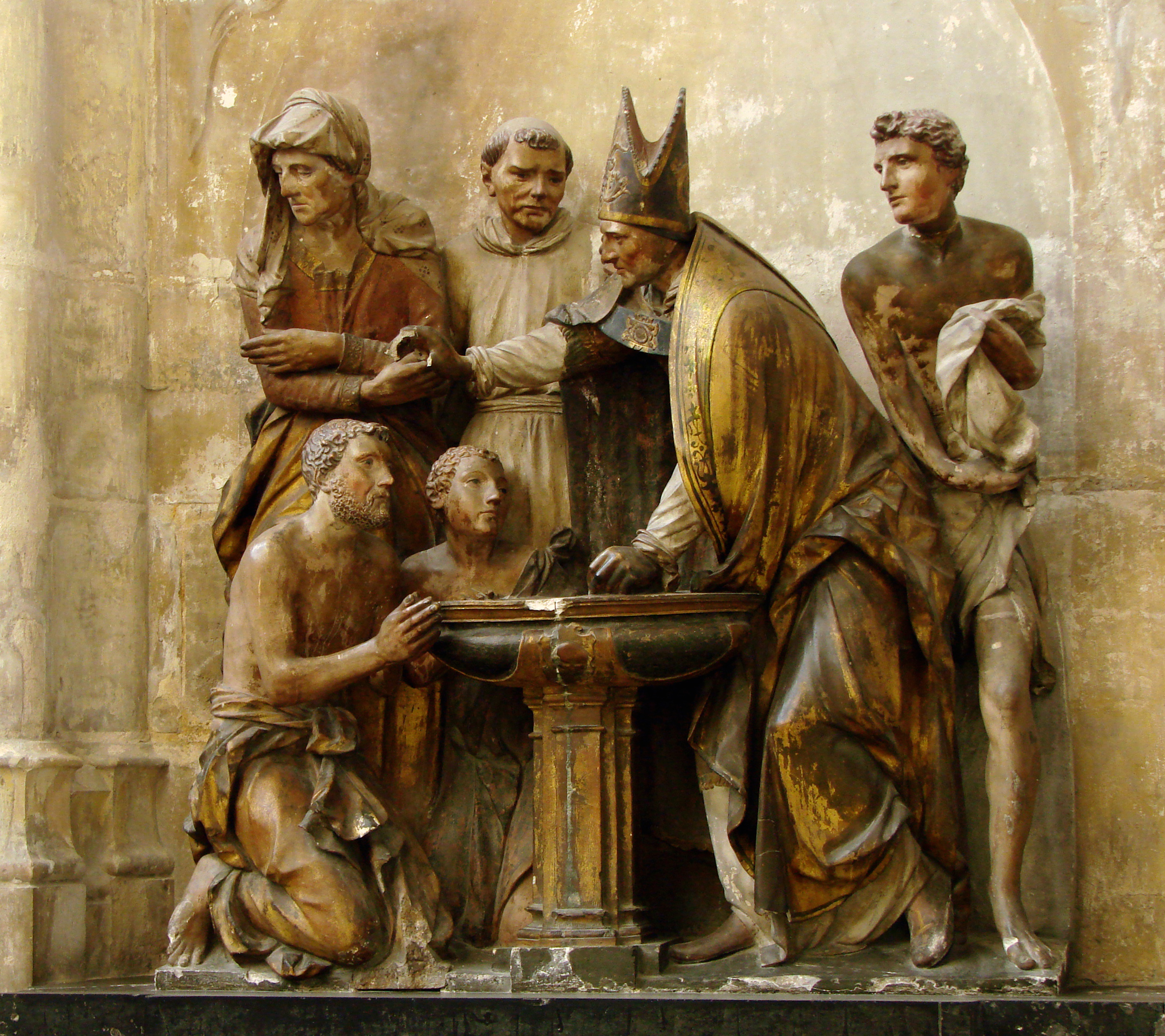
Cathédrale Saint-Pierre-et-Saint-Paul de Troyes (1549)

- Many half-timbered houses (mainly of the 16th century) survive in the old town.
- Hôtels particuliers (mansions) of the old town
- The Hôtel de Ville on Place Alexandre Israël, is an urbane example of the style Louis XIII. On the central corps de logis, which contains the main reception rooms, its cornice is rhythmically broken forward over paired Corinthian columns; these are supported below by strong clustered pilasters. Above the entrance door the statue of Louis XIV was pulled out of its niche and smashed in 1793, during the Reign of Terror at the height of the French Revolution; it was replaced in the nineteenth century with the present Helmeted Minerva and the device in its original form. It is now rare to see "Liberté, Egalité, Fraternité, ou la Mort". In the Salle du Conseil (Council Chamber) a marble medallion of Louis XIV (1690) by François Girardon, born at Troyes, survived the destruction unscathed.

=== Museums ===
- Museum of Modern Art (Musée d'Art Moderne)
- Maison de l'outil et de la pensée ouvrière
- Vauluisant Museum :
  - Historical museum of Troyes and Champagne-Ardenne
  - Museum of hosiery
- Hôtel-Dieu-Lecomte apothecary
- Saint-Loup Museum (museum of fine arts)
- Di Marco Museum (Open from 1 April to 1 October, each year)

=== Churches ===
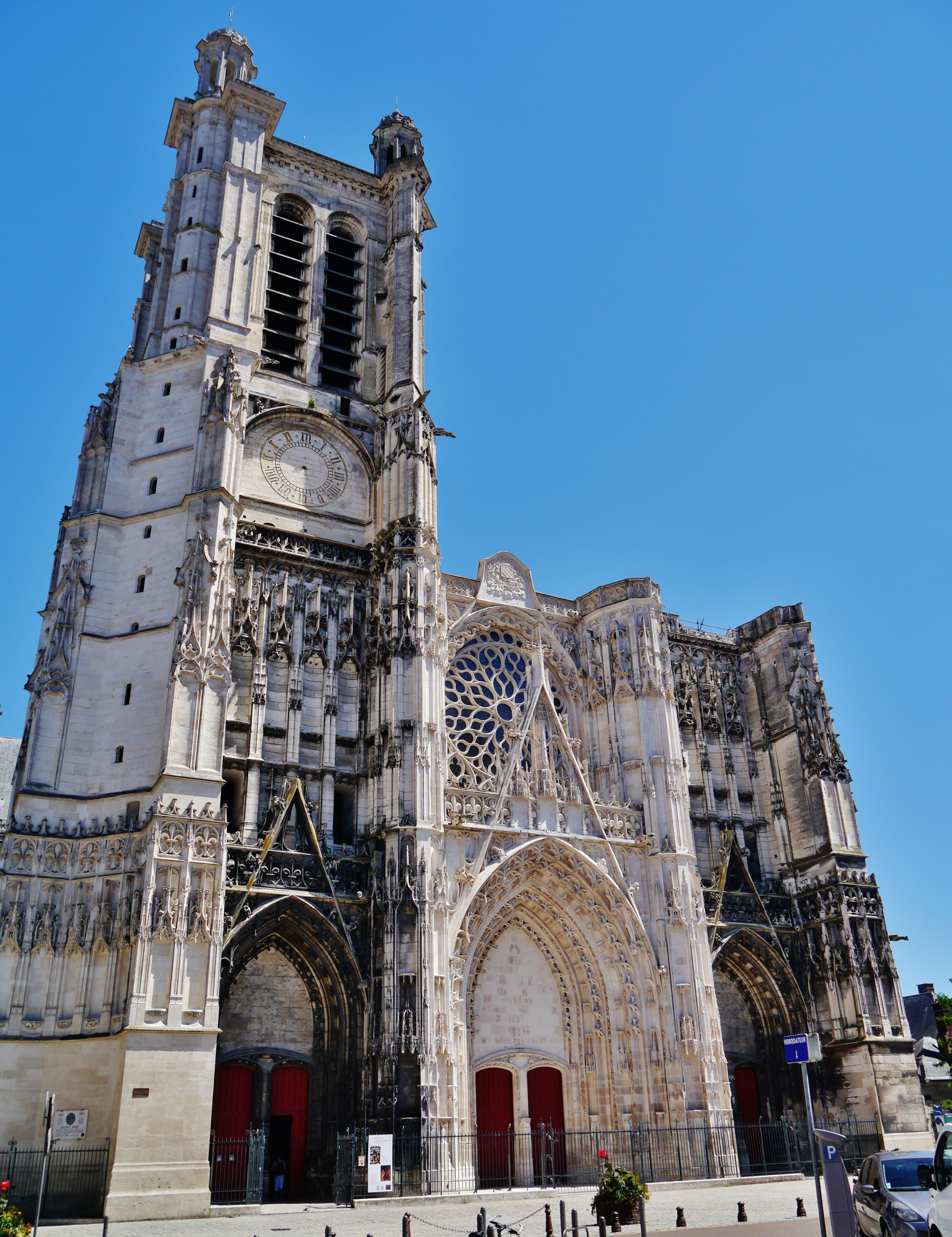
Cathedral western front

Not having suffered from the last wars, Troyes has a high density of old religious buildings grouped close to the city centre. They include:

- Saint-Pierre-et-Saint-Paul Cathedral
- Saint-Nizier Church, in Gothic and Renaissance style, with remarkable sculptures. Classified as a Monument Historique (French equivalence) in 1840.
- The Gothic Saint-Urbain Basilica (thirteenth century), with a roofing covered by polished tiles. It was built by Jacques Pantaléon, who was elected pope in 1261, under the name of Urbain IV, on grounds where his father had a workshop. Classified Monument Historique in 1840. It was proclaimed a basilica in 1964.
- Sainte-Madeleine Church. Very early Gothic, with east end rebuilt around 1500. Remarkably elaborate stone rood screen of 1508–17 in Flamboyant Gothic style, sculpted by Jean Gailde, with a statue of Saint Martha. Fine Renaissance stained glass. Saint Jean district. Classified Monument historique in 1840.
- Saint-Jean Church, with a Renaissance chancel, tabernacle of the high altar by Giraudon. On the portal, coat of arms of Charles IX. Classified Monument Historique in 1840.
- Gothic Saint-Nicolas Church, dating to the beginning of the sixteenth century, with a calvary chapel -shaped rostrum reached by a monumental staircase. On the south portal, two sculptures by François Gentil of David and Isaiah.
- Saint-Pantaléon Church, with extensive statuary from the sixteenth century.
- Saint Remy Church, with a 14th-century spire rising to a height of 60 m (196.85 ft). A 17th-century sundial on its south side bears the Latin inscription sicut umbra dies nostri super terram ("our days on earth pass like a shadow").
- Church of Saint-Martin-ès-Vignes. It has stained glass windows of the seventeenth century by the local master verrier Linard Gonthier.

Several Troyes churches have sculpture by The Maître de Chaource.

=== Synagogues ===
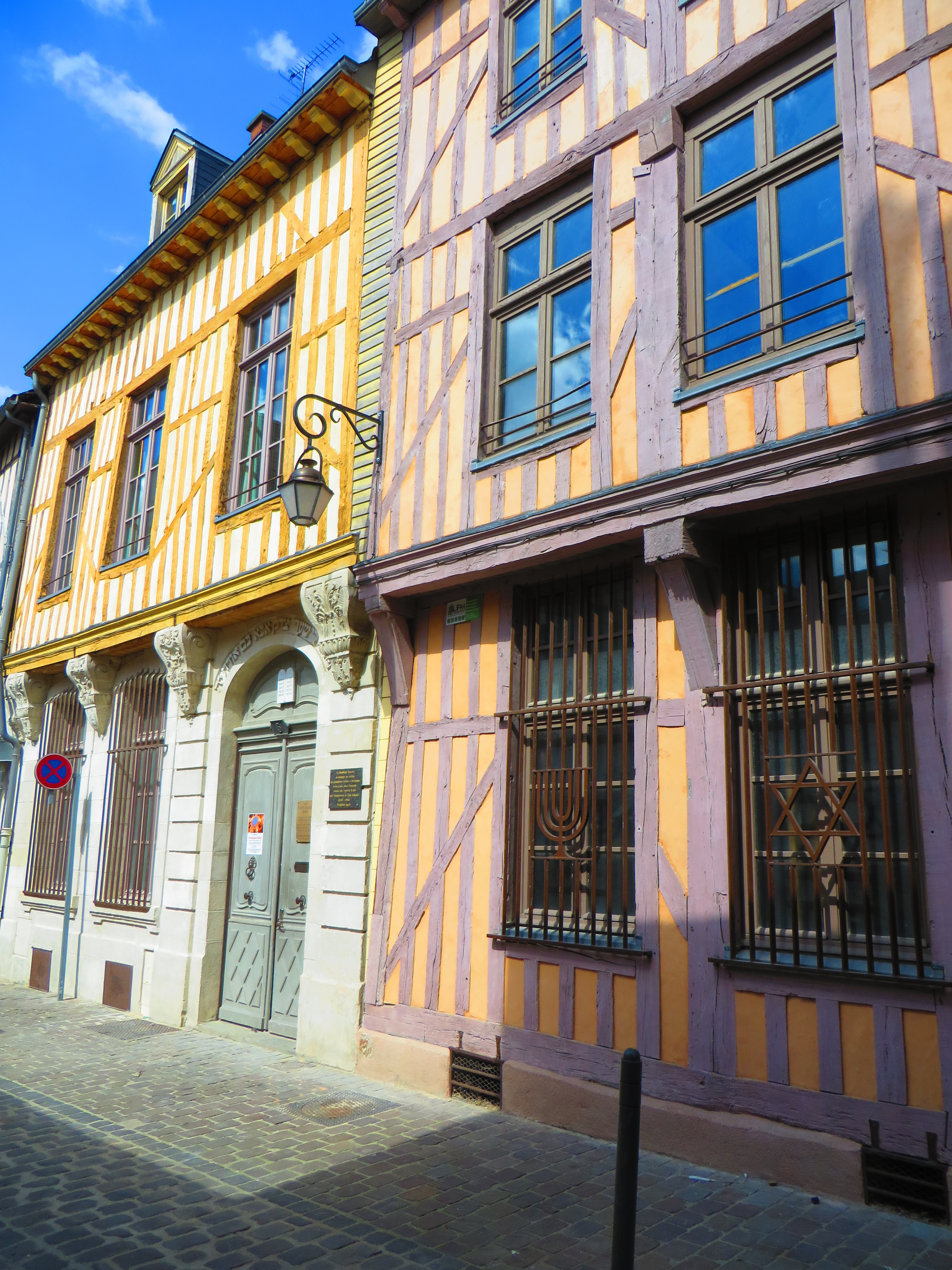
The Rashi Synagogue

Jewish worship is conducted in the Rashi Synagogue of Troyes, named in honor of Rabbi Salomon Ben Isaac, known as Rashi, the famous commentator of the Talmud. The current building was constructed on the site of an old abbey from the 16th century and replaced the synagogue destroyed during World War II The building is in Renaissance style and was restored in the 20th century. It consists of a half-timbered house from the 16th century and another house dating from the 18th century (Louis XV style). A cultural center has also been established.

Recent renovations were undertaken to restore the synagogue to reflect the spirit of Rashi of Troyes' time. The inauguration took place on 4 September 2016, in the presence of Haim Korsia, the Chief Rabbi of France.

== Population ==
The inhabitants of the commune are called Troyens in French.

Historical population

Year	Pop.	±% p.a.
1793	26,751	—
1800	24,061	−1.50%
1806	27,196	+2.06%
1821	25,078	−0.54%
1831	23,740	−0.55%
1836	25,563	+1.49%
1841	25,469	−0.07%
1846	25,702	+0.18%
1851	27,376	+1.27%
1856	33,071	+3.85%
1861	34,613	+0.92%
1866	35,678	+0.61%
1872	38,113	+1.11%
1876	41,275	+2.01%
1881	46,067	+2.22%
1886	46,972	+0.39%
1891	50,330	+1.39%
1896	52,998	+1.04%
1901	53,146	+0.06%

Year	Pop.	±% p.a.
1906	53,447	+0.11%
1911	55,486	+0.75%
1921	55,215	−0.05%
1926	58,321	+1.10%
1931	58,804	+0.17%
1936	57,961	−0.29%
1946	58,805	+0.14%
1954	58,819	+0.00%
1962	67,406	+1.72%
1968	74,898	+1.77%
1975	72,165	−0.53%
1982	63,579	−1.79%
1990	59,255	−0.88%
1999	60,958	+0.32%
2007	61,823	+0.18%
2012	60,009	−0.59%
2017	61,652	+0.54%
2023	62,088	+0.12%

Source: EHESS and INSEE (1968–2023)

== Economy ==
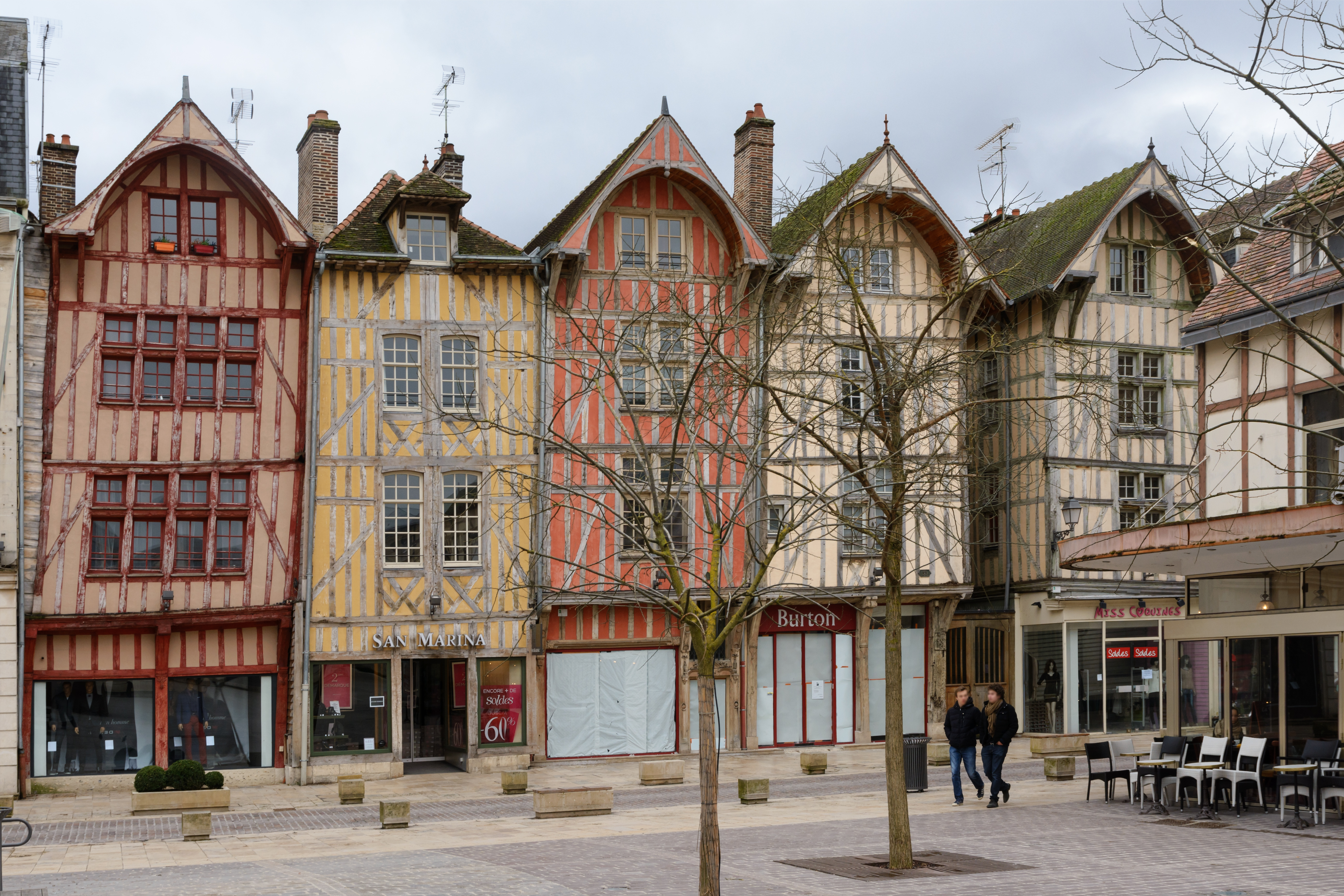
Houses in the old town

Troyes is home to the production headquarters of Lacoste company, a clothing brand. It is also home of chocolatier Pascal Caffet.

== Education ==
The University of Technology of Troyes and the business school Groupe École supérieure de commerce de Troyes are located in Troyes.

== Transport ==
The train station Gare de Troyes offers connections to Paris, Dijon, Mulhouse and several regional destinations. Troyes is at the junction of motorways A5 (Paris – Troyes – Langres) and A26 (Calais – Reims – Troyes). Troyes – Barberey Airport is a small regional airport. There are no services to and from the airport, the last remaining carrier, cancelled its seasonal service to Bastia in January 2013. The nearest airports to Troyes are Châlons Vatry Airport, located 65 km (40 mi) north and Paris's Charles de Gaulle Airport, located 188 km (117 mi) northwest of the town.

== Sport ==
Troyes is the home of association football club Troyes AC, or ESTAC. In the 2020–21 Ligue 2 season, Troyes were promoted back to Ligue 1 as champions of the division.

== In popular culture ==
- Troyes (2010) is a board game named after the city, published by Pearl Games, UPlay.it edizioni, and Z-Man Games.

== Notable people ==
- Jean-Marie Bigard, (born 1954), French stand-up comedian, writer and director
- Saint Marguerite Bourgeoys, (1620–1700), a founder of Congregation of Notre Dame of Montreal and the city of Montreal
- Gilles Buck (1935–2010), French sailor who competed in the 1968 Summer Olympics
- Émile Coué (1857–1926), pharmacist, hypnotist and creator of La méthode Coué ("Every day, in every way, I'm getting better and better")
- Hughes de Payens (1070–1136), Knight of the First Crusade and founder of the Knights Templar
- Chrétien de Troyes, 12th-century trouvère
- Doete de Troyes, 13th-century poet
- François Girardon (1628–1715), sculptor
- Linard Gonthier (1565 – after 1642), stained-glass artisan (verrier)
- François-Pierre Goy (born 1960), musicologist
- Édouard Herriot (1872–1957), Radical politician of the Third Republic, three-time Prime Minister of France
- André Lefèvre (1717–1768), contributor to the Encyclopédie
- Maurice Marinot (1882–1960), glass artist and painter
- Pierre Mignard (1610–1695), painter
- Jacques Pantaléon, (c. 1195–1264), Pope Urban IV
- Patroclus of Troyes (3rd century), martyr
- Pierre Pithou (1539–1596), Calvinist jurisconsult and scholar, co-editor of the Satire Ménippée
- Rashi (1040–1105), biblical and Talmudic commentator
- Rabbeinu Tam (1100–1171), rabbi and Rashi's grandson
- Maxime Rouyer, (born 1994), CFL linebacker for the Edmonton Eskimos
- Béatrice Saubin (1959–2007), first foreign national to be sentenced to death in Malaysia for drug smuggling
- Djibril Sidibé, (born 1992), footballer
- Nicolas Siret (1663–1754), composer
- Abdoul Sissoko, (born 1990), footballer
- Gaëtane Thiney (born 1985), footballer and team captain of Paris FC (women), current member of France women's national football team, Cyprus Cup winner: 2012, 2014, 2017 SheBelieves Cup champion, UEFA Women's Under-19 Championship: 2003, an all-star team member of the UEFA Women's Championship All-Star Team: 2013, two-time winner player of the year
- Jean Tirole, (born 1953), Nobel Award in Economics
- Aldebrandin of Siena, (died 1296/1299?), physician
- Madame Vaudé-Green (1822–1902), nineteenth century French photographer

== Twin towns ==
Troyes is twinned with:

- Alkmaar, Netherlands
- Chesterfield, England
- Tournai, Belgium
- Darmstadt, Germany, since 1958
- Zielona Góra, Poland, since 1970
- Brescia, Italy, since 2016

== Climate ==
Climate data for Troyes - Barberey (QYR), elevation: 112 m (367 ft) (1991–2020 normals, extremes 1975-present)
Month	Jan	Feb	Mar	Apr	May	Jun	Jul	Aug	Sep	Oct	Nov	Dec	Year
Record high °C (°F)	16.2 (61.2)	22.1 (71.8)	26.1 (79.0)	29.2 (84.6)	33.3 (91.9)	40.8 (105.4)	41.8 (107.2)	40.6 (105.1)	35.0 (95.0)	30.3 (86.5)	23.0 (73.4)	19.0 (66.2)	41.8 (107.2)
Mean daily maximum °C (°F)	6.8 (44.2)	8.2 (46.8)	12.5 (54.5)	16.2 (61.2)	19.9 (67.8)	23.5 (74.3)	26.2 (79.2)	26.0 (78.8)	21.6 (70.9)	16.6 (61.9)	10.6 (51.1)	7.4 (45.3)	16.3 (61.3)
Daily mean °C (°F)	3.6 (38.5)	4.3 (39.7)	7.4 (45.3)	10.2 (50.4)	14.0 (57.2)	17.4 (63.3)	19.8 (67.6)	19.6 (67.3)	15.7 (60.3)	11.9 (53.4)	7.1 (44.8)	4.3 (39.7)	11.3 (52.3)
Mean daily minimum °C (°F)	0.5 (32.9)	0.3 (32.5)	2.2 (36.0)	4.2 (39.6)	8.1 (46.6)	11.3 (52.3)	13.4 (56.1)	13.2 (55.8)	9.8 (49.6)	7.2 (45.0)	3.5 (38.3)	1.3 (34.3)	6.3 (43.3)
Record low °C (°F)	−23.0 (−9.4)	−17.6 (0.3)	−15.4 (4.3)	−6.2 (20.8)	−2.0 (28.4)	0.4 (32.7)	3.1 (37.6)	3.0 (37.4)	−0.4 (31.3)	−7.0 (19.4)	−11.1 (12.0)	−18.0 (−0.4)	−23.0 (−9.4)
Average precipitation mm (inches)	48.2 (1.90)	44.2 (1.74)	45.9 (1.81)	48.3 (1.90)	64.9 (2.56)	52.4 (2.06)	56.4 (2.22)	53.9 (2.12)	52.4 (2.06)	63.8 (2.51)	55.3 (2.18)	58.9 (2.32)	644.6 (25.38)
Average precipitation days (≥ 1.0 mm)	10.5	9.7	9.5	9.4	10.2	8.7	7.9	7.7	7.9	9.7	10.2	11.5	112.9
Average snowy days	3.7	4.6	2.5	0.4	0.0	0.0	0.0	0.0	0.0	0.0	1.6	3.2	15.9
Average relative humidity (%)	88	80	75	69	75	72	65	66	72	83	88	88	77
Average dew point °C (°F)	2 (36)	1 (34)	3 (37)	5 (41)	9 (48)	13 (55)	13 (55)	13 (55)	11 (52)	9 (48)	5 (41)	4 (39)	7 (45)
Mean monthly sunshine hours	63.1	90.4	148.3	190.0	216.4	230.8	242.2	232.0	185.7	125.4	69.8	57.4	1,851.4
Source 1: Meteociel (snowy days 1981-2010)
Source 2: Time and Date

== See also ==
- Communes of the Aube department
- Count of Troyes
- Order of the Knights Templar
- Troy weight#Etymology
- Scottish Women's Hospitals for Foreign Service
