= Marcilly-sur-Seine =

- Commune
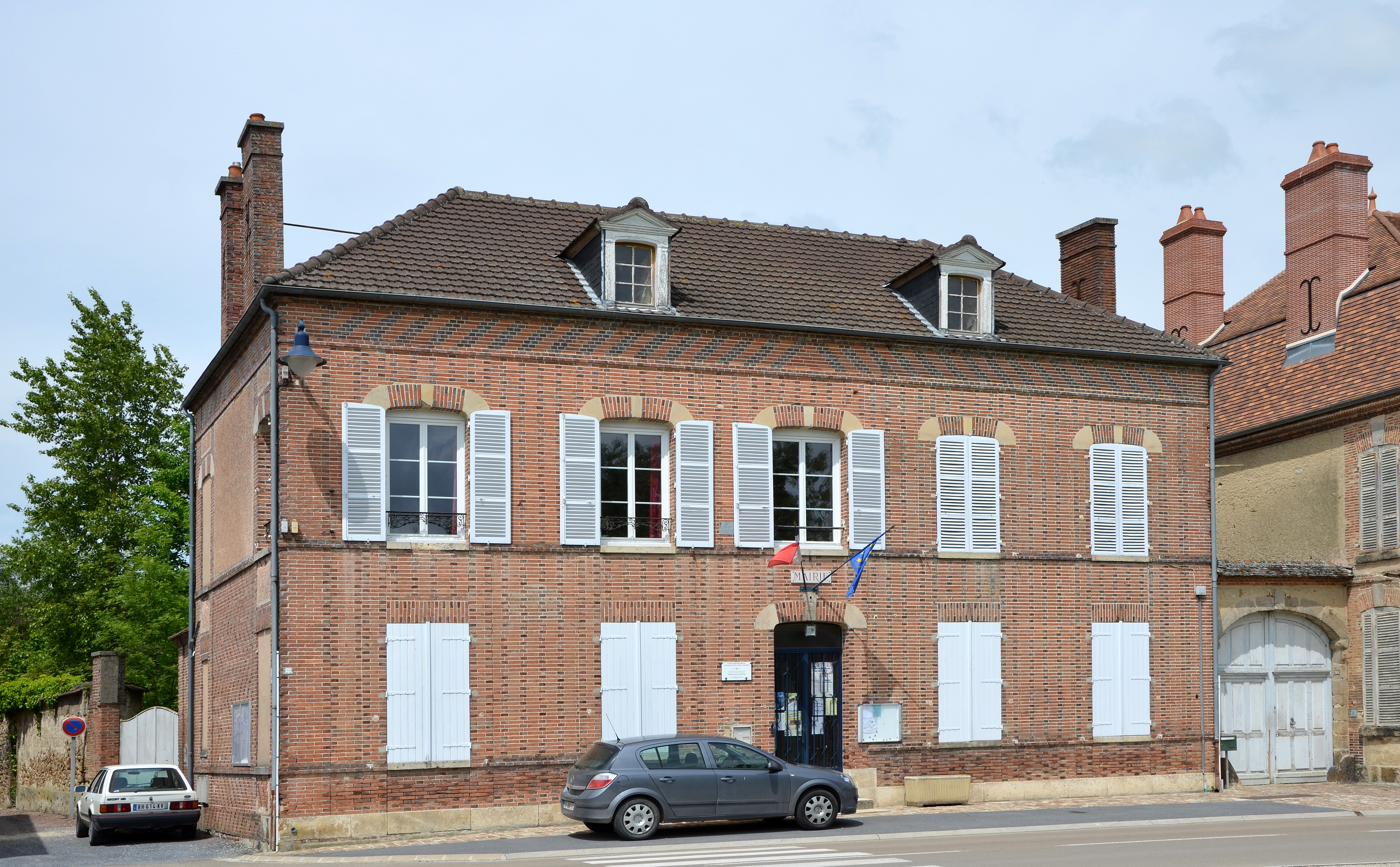
- The town hall in Marcilly-sur-Seine
- Location of Marcilly-sur-Seine
- Location within France Location within Grand Est
- Coordinates: 48°33′27″N 3°42′36″E
- Country: France
- Region: Grand Est
- Department: Marne
- Arrondissement: Épernay
- Canton: Vertus-Plaine Champenoise
- Intercommunality: Sézanne-Sud Ouest Marnais

Government
  - Mayor (2020–2026): Benoît Bassac
- Area^{1}: 10.01 km^{2} (3.86 sq mi)
- Elevation: 70 m (230 ft)
- Population (2023): 622
  - Density: 62.1/km^{2} (161/sq mi)
- Time zone: UTC+01:00 (CET)
  - Summer (DST): UTC+02:00 (CEST)
- INSEE/Postal code: 51343 /51260
- ^{1} French Land Register data, which excludes lakes, ponds, glaciers > 1 km^{2} (0.386 sq mi or 247 acres) and river estuaries.

Marcilly-sur-Seine (French pronunciation: [maʁsiji syʁ sɛn], literally Marcilly on Seine) is a commune in the Marne department in north-eastern France. It is near the confluence of the Aube and the Seine.

== See also ==
- Communes of the Marne department
