= Louise Adélaïde d'Orléans =

Louise Adélaïde
- Abbess of Chelles
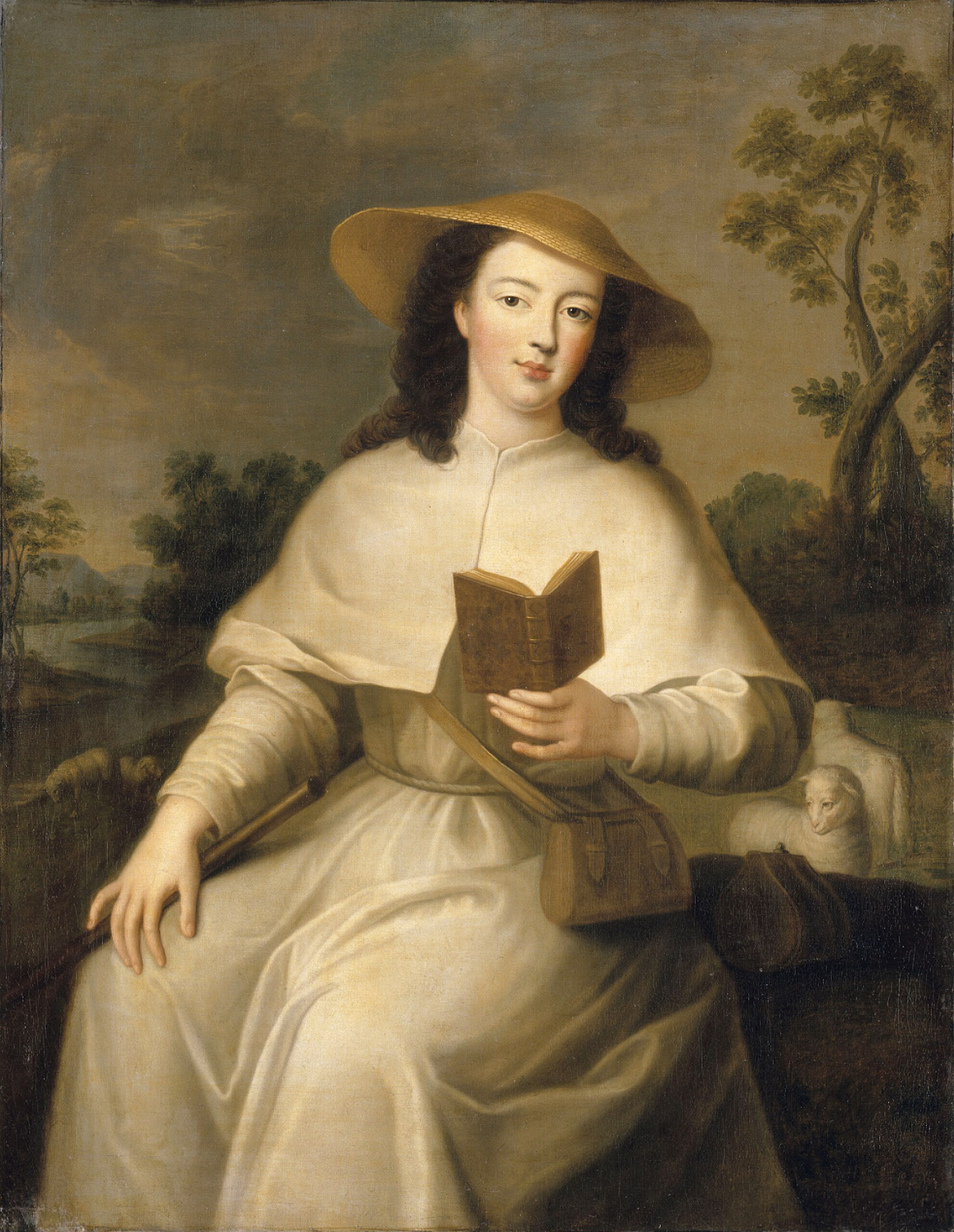
- Portrait by Jean-Baptiste Santerre, 1725
- Born: 13 August 1698; Palace of Versailles, Kingdom of France
- Died: 10 February 1743 (aged 44); Convent de la Madeleine de Traisnel, Paris, Kingdom of France
Names
- Marie Louise Adélaïde d'Orléans
- House: Orléans
- Father: Philippe d'Orléans
- Mother: Françoise Marie de Bourbon
- Religion: Roman Catholicism

Louise Adélaïde d'Orléans (Marie Louise Adélaïde; 13 August 1698 – 10 February 1743) was the second daughter of Philippe d'Orléans and Françoise Marie de Bourbon, a legitimised daughter of Louis XIV and his mistress, Madame de Montespan. She was an Abbess of Chelles.

== Early years ==
Marie Louise Adélaïde d'Orléans was born at the Palace of Versailles on 13 August 1698. After the marriage of her aunt Élisabeth Charlotte d'Orléans, Louise Adélaïde was known at court as Mademoiselle de Chartres. She assumed the style of Mademoiselle d'Orléans in 1710 after her elder sister Marie Louise Élisabeth d'Orléans married Charles, Duke of Berry.

=== Character ===
Very close to her sisters Marie Louise Élisabeth and Charlotte Aglaé, Louise Adélaïde was considered the most beautiful of the Orléans daughters. Her paternal grandmother, Elizabeth Charlotte of the Palatinate, described her in the following manner:

...[She is] well made, and is the handsomest of my granddaughters. She has a fine skin, a superb complexion, very white teeth, good eyes, and a faultless shape. Her hands are extremely delicate, the red and white are beautifully and naturally mingled in her skin. I never saw finer teeth; they are like a row of pearls.

Also according to her grandmother, Louise Adélaïde was very passionate about music and showed an interest in both theology and the sciences. In particular, she was intrigued with the science of surgery which was then going through an era of change and improvement.

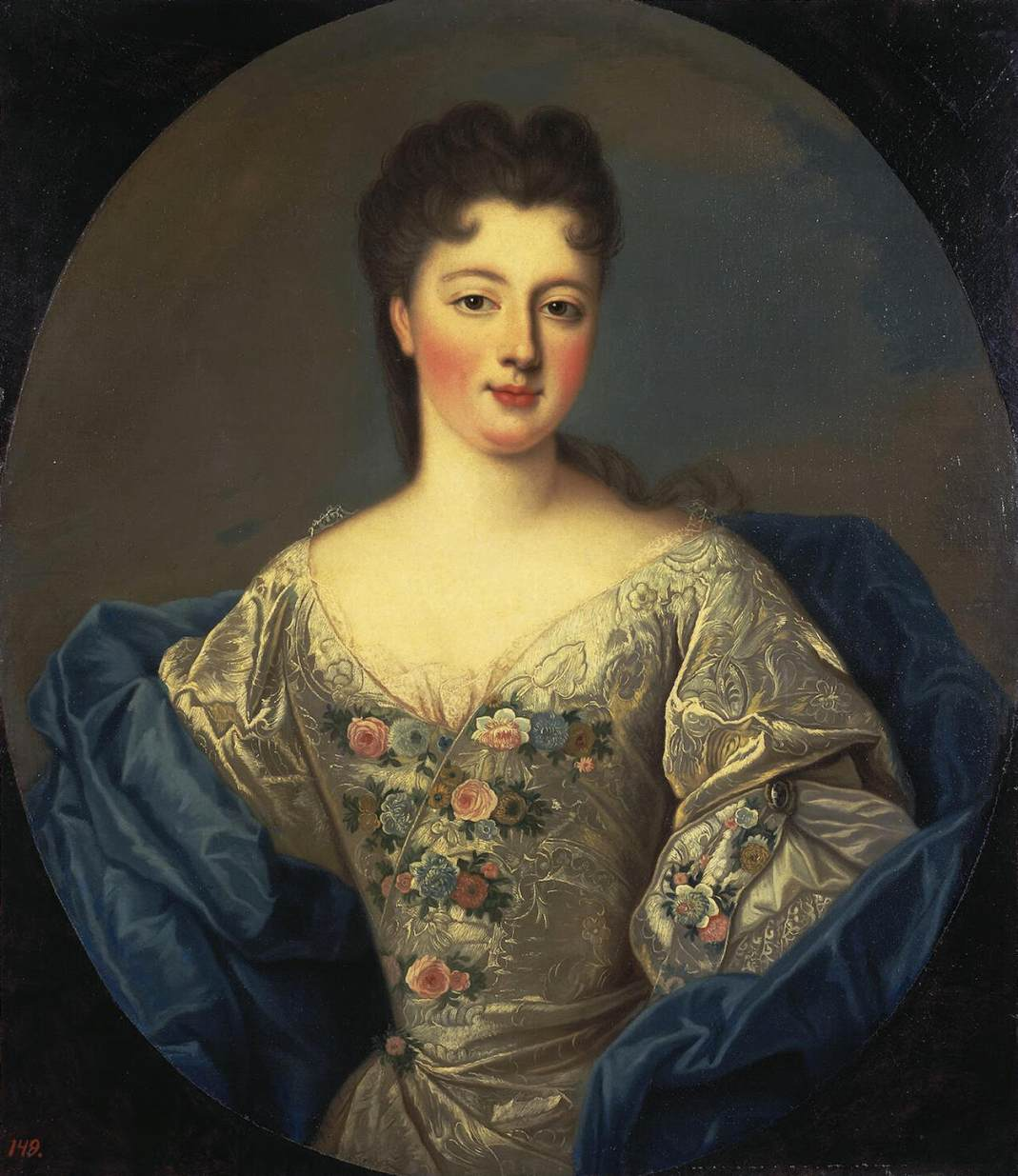
Portrait of Louise Adélaïde by Pierre Gobert

On her entrance into a convent, Louis Racine composed a verse about her:

Plaisir, beauté, jeunesse, honneurs, gloire, puissance,
Ambitieux espoir que permet la naissance,
Tout au pied de l'Agneau fut par elle immolé.

Louise Adélaïde and her sister Charlotte Aglaé were both placed in the Abbey of Chelles from a young age. Their education was briefly interrupted in 1710 for the wedding of their eldest sister Marie Louise Élisabeth. Louise Adélaïde and Charlotte Aglaé held her train.

Initially, young Louise Adélaïde was considered as a possible bride for her cousin, Louis-Auguste de Bourbon, Prince of Dombes. He was the eldest son of her uncle, the Duke of Maine and his wife, Anne Louise Bénédicte de Bourbon. As the eldest son, he was the heir to his father's immense fortune. Louise Adélaïde, very pious by nature, though, refused his hand in marriage. The young prince then turned to her younger sister, Charlotte Aglaé, who also refused his hand. Both the Prince of Dombes and Louise Adélaïde eventually died unmarried.

Another possible candidate was James Francis Edward Stuart, the "Old Pretender" to the British throne.

In 1716, Louise Adélaïde wanted to marry the Chevalier de Saint-Maixent; he was one of the king's pages, who had saved her from an accident during a hunt at the cost of an injury which nearly proved fatal. Louise Adélaïde tried as much as she could to try to get her parents' permission to marry the young Chevalier but both refused. The duchess of Orléans was horrified at the suggestion of such a mesalliance and reportedly treated Louise Adélaïde so harshly on the subject that it caused her to "take the veil" and become a nun.

It was on 31 March 1717 that she took the veil officially; the ceremony was held in front of her parents.

== Abbesse of Chelles ==
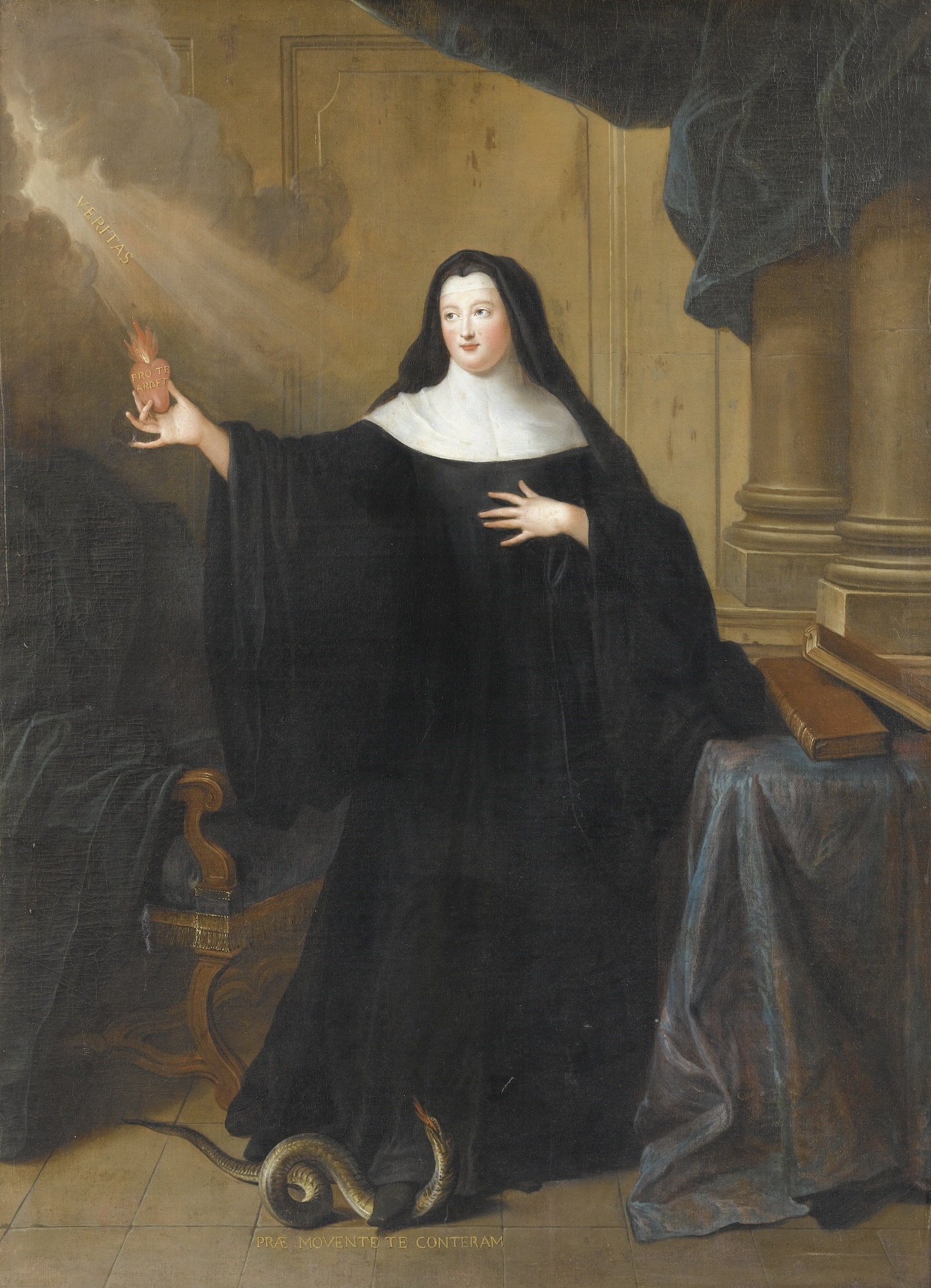
Louise Adélaïde as Sister Saint Bathilde by Pierre Gobert

As a result of the scandalous life led by her elder sister, the Duchess of Berry, who was notoriously promiscuous and concealed several pregnancies, Louise Adélaïde decided to become a nun. Her parents, as well as her paternal grandmother, were opposed to it, but she became a nun anyway. As a nun, she took the name of Sœur Sainte-Bathilde (Sister Saint Bathilde) in 1717. She held that name until the next year. While at Chelles, Louise Adélaïde showed a slight interest in Jansenism.

During the Regency of Louis XV, Louise Adélaïde was seen as the preeminent religious figure in the country.

In 1719, she became the Abbess of Chelles, a post she held until her death. She was also the Abbess of Val-de-Grâce, a church built under the auspices of her maternal and paternal great-grandmother Anne of Austria, the wife of King Louis XIII.

In 1720, when Charlotte Aglaé had to leave France to meet her husband in Modena, she insisted on seeing her sister before she left. According to their grandmother, it was an emotional scene.

While at Chelles Louise Adélaïde greatly embellished the Abbey: she ordered the repaving of the cloisters, the restoration of the Chapter Room, had an infirmary constructed, and had a system where drinkable water could be accessed by the Abbey members as well as the town. Louise Adélaïde also allowed the Sisters of the Abbey of Nevers to build a house in the town in order to help educate the local girls.

She was known as Madame d'Orléans while at Chelles from 1719 until 1734. She died at the age of forty-four from smallpox at the Convent de la Madeleine de Traisnel in Paris.

== Ancestors ==
Ancestors of Louise Adélaïde d'Orléans

8. Louis XIII of France
4. Philippe I, Duke of Orléans
9. Anne of Austria
2. Philippe II, Duke of Orléans
10. Charles I Louis, Elector Palatine
5. Elizabeth Charlotte of the Palatinate
11. Charlotte of Hesse-Kassel
1. Louise Adélaïde d'Orléans
12. Louis XIII of France (= 8)
6. Louis XIV of France
13. Anne of Austria (= 9)
3. Françoise Marie de Bourbon
14. Gabriel de Rochechouart, Duke of Mortemart
7. Madame de Montespan
15. Diane de Grandseigne

Louise Adélaïde d'Orléans House of Orléans Cadet branch of the House of Bourbon Born: 13 August 1698 Died: 10 February 1743
French nobility
| Vacant Title last held by Élisabeth Charlotte d'Orléans | Mademoiselle de Chartres; 1698-1710 | Vacant Title next held by Louise Diane d'Orléans |
| Preceded by Marie Louise Élisabeth d'Orléans | Mademoiselle d'Orléans; 1710-1719 | Vacant Title next held by Louise Marie d'Orléans |
Religious titles
| Preceded by Unknown | Abbess of Chelles; 1719-1734 | Succeeded by Unknown |
