= Sophie de Brégis, comtesse d'Averne =

French courtesan

Sophie de Brégis, comtesse d'Averne (fl. 1723), was a French courtesan. She was the official mistress of Philippe II, Duke of Orléans, who was the regent of France during the minority of the infant King Louis XV. She was the mistress of the regent during 1721.

== Life ==
Her parents are unknown. She married comte Ferrand d'Averne, who though a nobleman was a poor lieutenant of the royal guard. After marriage, she became a courtesan of Marquis d'Alincourt and Armand de Vignerot du Plessis, duc de Richelieu.

She became the official mistress of the regent in 1721, after he was left by Marie-Madeleine de Parabère and then dismissed Marie-Thérèse Blonel de Phalaris the same year. The regent arranged a big party to her honor at 30 July 1721 at the Château de Saint-Cloud which attracted great attention to their relationship, which became a big scandal which was mocked in libelous literature.

The regent dismissed her before the end of 1721, allegedly because she was unfaithful with the duc de Richelieu. After her, the regent did not have an official mistress again until 1723, when Louise-Charlotte de Foix-Rabat, comtesse de Sabran introduced him to Mlle Houel, who he swiftly replaced with Marie-Madeleine de Parabère. d'Averne is mentioned last in 1723, being still active as a courtesan.
