= Pierre-Marie-François Baour-Lormian =

French poet and writer (1770–1854)

Louis-Pierre Baour (24 March 1770 – 18 December 1854) was a French poet and writer. He wrote under the names Pierre-Marie-François Baour-Lormian, Louis-Pierre-Marie-François, Pierre-Marie-François-Louis or Pierre-Marie-Louis Baour-Lormian.

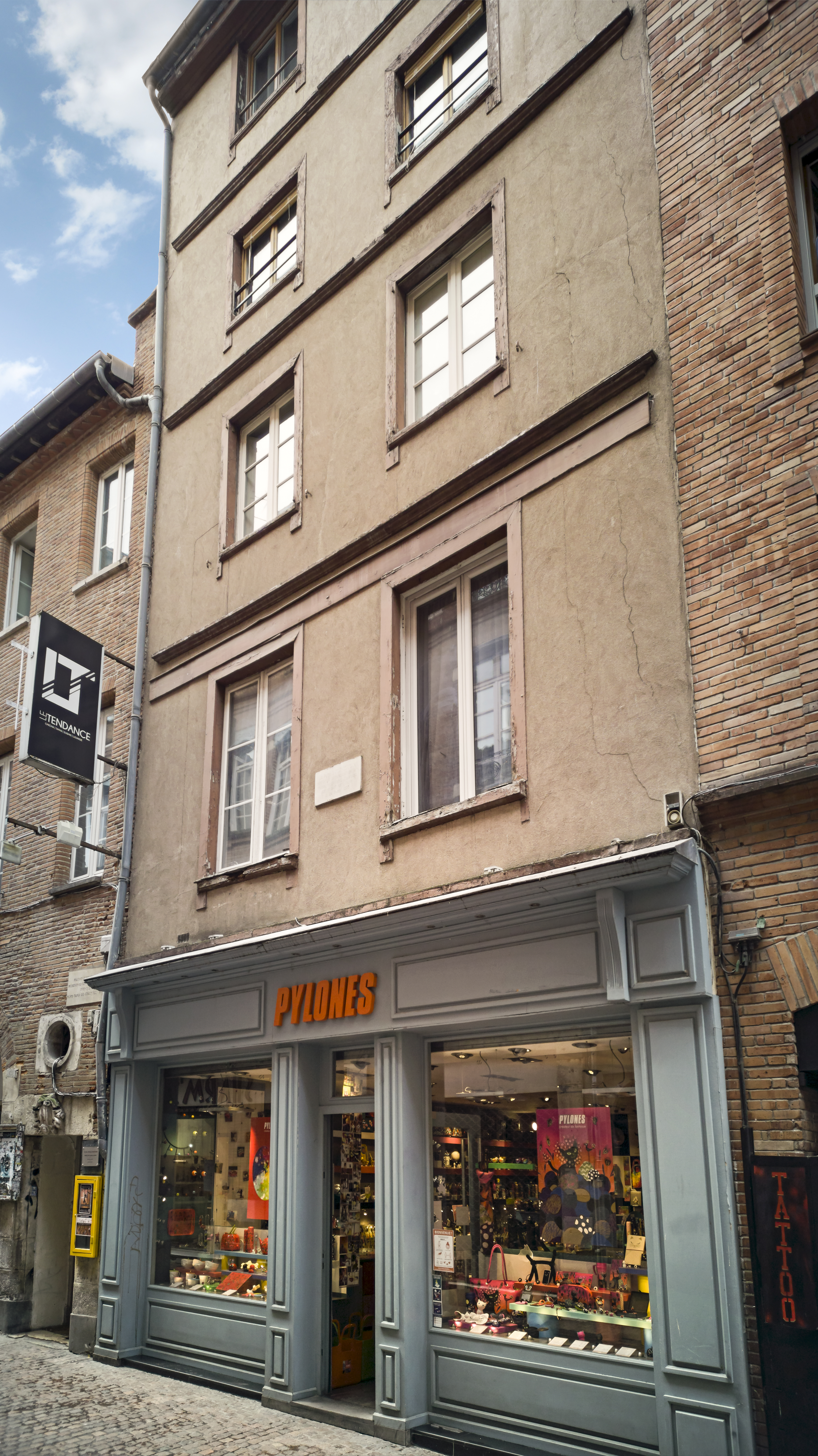
Birthplace of Pierre-Baour Lormian.

== Biography ==
Baour-Lormian was born at Toulouse. Baour first published satires, then in translations in verse (1795) of Ossian's poems and of Torquato Tasso Jerusalem Delivered. He successfully put on a production of the tragedy of Omasis, ou Joseph en Égypte as well as the operas La Jérusalem délivrée, Aminte, and Alexandre à Babylone. He worked in all the literary genres, even in epic poetry (L'Atlantide, 1812). In 1819, he redid his translation of Torquato Tasso, which remains his main work. In his last years, having gone blind, he put the poem of Job into verse.

He was elected a member of the Académie Française on 29 March 1815. Baour-Lormian died at Paris in 1854.

== Works ==
- Poésies Galiques (1801)
- Omasis (1806)
- Mahomet II (1810)
- Veillées poétiques (1811)
- Fêtes de l'Hymen
- La Jérusalem délivrée (1812, opera, translation of Jerusalem Delivered)
- Poésies d'Ossian (1827, verse translation of the works of Ossian)
