= Marie-Madeleine de Parabère =

French aristocrat

Madame de Parabère
- Marquise of Parabère
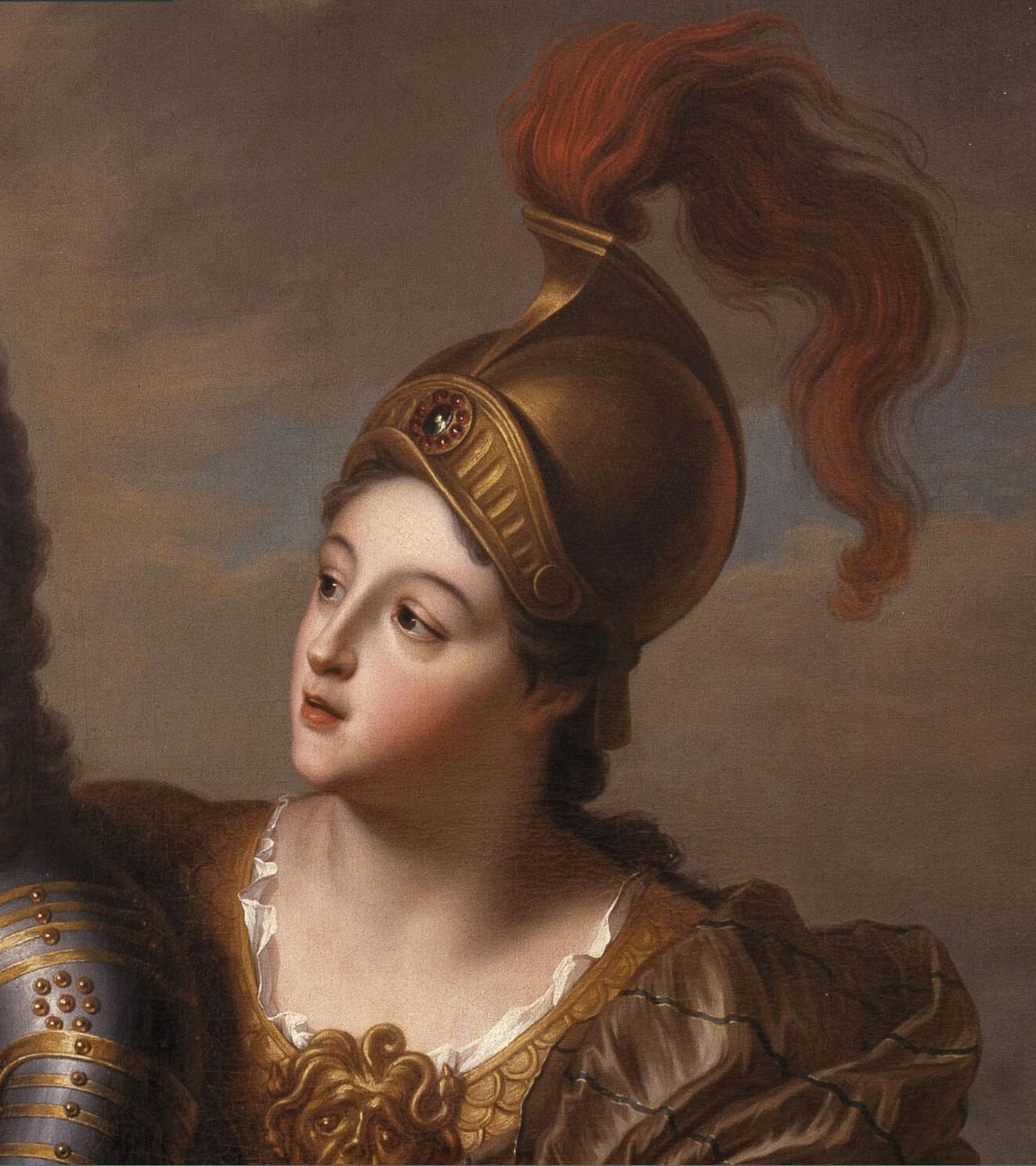
- Jean-Baptiste Santerre, detail of Philippe II, Duke of Orléans, and Madame de Parabère as Minerva, c. 1715–1716, Palace of Versailles
- Full name: Marie Madeleine de La Vieuville
- Born: 6 October 1693; Paris, France
- Died: 13 August 1755 (aged 62); Paris, France
- Spouses: Caesar Alexandre de Baudéan, Marquis of Parabère
- Issue: none acknowledged
- Father: René Francois de La Vieuville, Marquis of La Vieuville
- Mother: Marie Louise de La Chaussee d'Eu
- Known for: mistress of Philippe d'Orléans

Marie Madeleine de La Vieuville, Marquise of Parabère (1693-1755), was a French aristocrat. She was the official mistress of Philippe II, Duke of Orléans, during his tenure as regent of France during the minority of the infant King Louis XV of France. That role made her a well known public figure during the French regency years (1715-1723).

== Life ==
=== Early life ===
Marie-Madeleine de Parabère was the only child of René Francois de La Vieuville and Marie Louise de La Chaussee d'Eu (d. 1715). Her mother was a lady-in-waiting to Marie Louise Élisabeth d'Orléans, Duchess of Berry.

In 1711, she married Caesar Alexandre de Baudéan, Marquis of Parabère (d. 1716). The marriage was not happy, but resulted in three children. Her husband had no position at court, but she was able to attend the royal court because of her mother, who was a lady-in-waiting.

She was courted by the Duke of Orleans, but her mother was determined to prevent her from becoming his mistress. Meanwhile, the duke had an affair with Madame de Sabran. When mother died in 1715 and she was widowed the following year, Marie-Madeleine de Parabère was free to live her own life as she pleased, and was able to inter in to a relationship with the Duke of Orleans, who was by then regent.

=== Mistress of the Regent ===
In 1716, she became the official mistress of the regent, succeeding Madame de Sabran as the regent's main favorite. She presided in his famous private parties and pleasure life. While she was the regent's principal mistress, he had numerous temporary lovers, as did she. She shared her place as his lover with multiple partners, notably Madame de Phalaris, but she was always his main favorite to whom he returned to in the end and reportedly felt love and respect. Among her own additional lovers were Thomas Goyon de Matignon, Jacques-Louis de Beringhen and Armand de Vignerot du Plessis. Many scandalous stories were told about her, as they were about the regent, and she was a central figure in the scandal press of the time.

She was described as bold and beautiful, with great will power and a taste for the pleasures of life, and the Regent reportedly loved her because he found her to be an equal partner, which whom he could indulge in pleasure and forget his work.

She had no influence in state affairs, simply because she had no interest in them and lacked political ambition. The regent's mother once remarked that her son appreciated her because she distracted him from political affairs and helped him indulge in pleasure instead, something they both preferred to politics.

=== Later life ===
In 1720, she successfully defeated Marie-Thérèse Blonel de Phalaris, who attempted to replace her as official mistress. However in January 1721 she herself ended the relationship with the regent, after an argument when she discovered him being unfaithful with two girls from the Opera.

The regent, who did not wish to lose her, continued to visit her and tried to persuade her to return, and a couple of months later she retired to a convent, claiming that she wished to make amends for past sins. However, she did not become a nun but simply lived in the convent as a guest, which was common in this era. She eventually had a relationship with M. le Premier and M. de La Mothe-Houdancourt.

The regent replaced her with first Marie-Thérèse Blonel de Phalaris and then Sophie de Brégis, comtesse d'Averne.

== Legacy ==
Madame de Parabère appears in many paintings of the regent.
