= Marie-Thérèse Blonel de Phalaris =

Marie-Thérèse Blonel de Phalaris (1697–1782), was a French aristocrat. She was the official mistress of Philippe II, Duke of Orléans, who was the regent of France during the minority of the infant King Louis XV. She was the mistress of the regent between 1720 and 1723.

== Life ==
She was married to George d'Entragues, duc de Phalaris, who went bankrupt and abandoned her to flee France to escape his creditors. Abandoned and poor, she was introduced by Louise-Charlotte de Foix-Rabat, comtesse de Sabran to the regent, and became his mistress, although she did not replace her as his main mistress until Marie-Madeleine de Parabère left the regent in 1721. Phalaris was described by the Parisian court nobility as a vulgar representative of the province nobility. Her spouse returned from Spain to take advantage of his wife's position, after which the regent dismissed her as his favorite and replaced her with Sophie de Brégis, comtesse d'Averne. After d'Averne was dismissed, Sabran introduced the regent to a sixteen-year-old convent girl, Mlle Houel, in 1723. The regent tired of the girl after but a few months, after which he replaced her by resuming his relationship with Phalaris, who then became his last official mistress.
