= Hilaire-Bernard de Longepierre =

French playwright

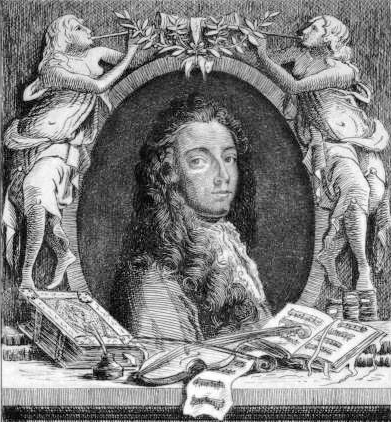
- Born: Hilaire Bernard de Requeleyne; 18 October 1659; Dijon, Province of Burgundy, France
- Died: 26 March 1721 (aged 61); Paris, France
- Occupation: Playwright

Hilaire-Bernard de Requeleyne, baron de Longepierre (18 October 1659 – 30 March 1721) was a 17th–18th-century French playwright.

== Short biography ==
A child prodigy, quoted in Enfants célèbres by Baillet, Baron Longepierre began by giving translations of Greek poets accompanied by scholarly notes. The coldness and infidelity of these translations earned him the sarcasm of Jean-Baptiste Rousseau, who then mocked his trials at tragedies.

If the bucolic style

Denigrated him,

He wants by the dramatic

Be drawn

From the rank of abject authors.

Greeks live !

Longepierre's tragedies aimed in fact to regain the perfect purity of Greek theater. His best play, Medea (1694), was first greeted coldly but triumphed when it was revived in 1728 and every time a talented actress undertook the title role. This tragedy, devoid of love, has terrifying passages, but it is static and the style is hard, verbose and declamatory. Longepierre then gave Sesostris (1695) and Electra (1702) which had little performances.

Despite Rousseau's epigrams, Longepierre, who had a large fortune, enjoyed general respect and was preceptor to the Count of Toulouse, then to the Duke of Chartres, future regent of the kingdom, of which he became ordinary gentleman. He was also a private secretary of the Duke of Berry.

== Works ==
Dramas

- 1694: Médée, five-act tragedy, 13 February
- 1695: Sésostris, five-act tragedy
- 1702: Électre, five-act tragedy
- 1712: Jérusalem délivrée, five-act tragédie en musique, music by the Duke of Orléans, played in Fontainebleau on 17 October

Poetry and translations

- 1684: Odes d'Anacréon et de Sapho, translated into French verse with remarks
- 1686: Idylles de Bion et de Moschus, translated into French verse with remarks (text available on Gallica)
- 1687: Discours sur les anciens, against Charles Perrault
- 1688: Idylles de Théocrite, translated into French verse
- 1690: Idylles nouvelles
- 1719: Lettre à M. de Voltaire sur la nouvelle tragédie d'Œdipe (text available on Gallica)

== Bibliography ==
- Gustave Vapereau: "Hilaire-Bernard de Longepierre" in Dictionnaire universel des littératures, Paris, Hachette, 1876, 2 volumes
