= Jean-Baptiste Santerre =

French painter (1651–1717)

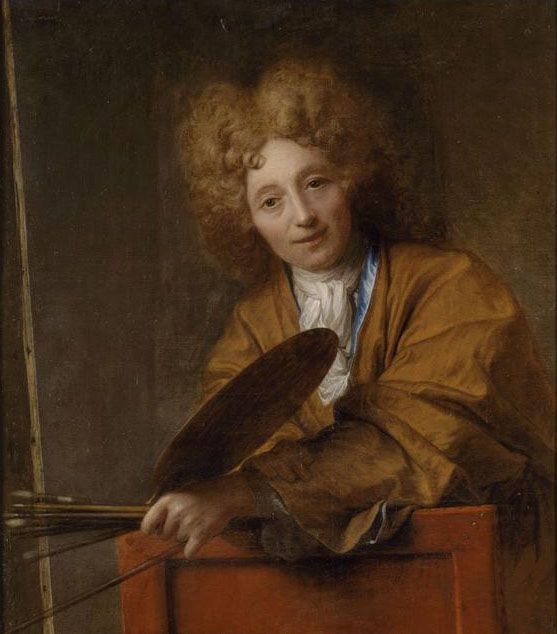
- Self-Portrait, 1704, oil on canvas, Palace of Versailles
- Born: 23 March 1651; Magny-en-Vexin, France
- Died: 21 November 1717 (aged 66); Paris, France
- Education: Bon Boullogne
- Known for: Painting
- Movement: Style Louis XIV

Jean-Baptiste Santerre (French pronunciation: [ʒɑ̃ batist sɑ̃tɛʁ]; 23 March 1651 – 21 November 1717) was a French painter and draughtsman of the Style Louis XIV, known for his history paintings, portraits, and portrait-like genre subjects. Considerably influenced by Italian masters of the Bolognese school as well as his French contemporaries, Santerre nonetheless made an original contribution in his art, being among the first French painters to bring Netherlandish influences.

Born in Magny-en-Vexin near Pontoise, Santerre studied notably under the history painter Bon Boullogne, and trained by copying works by Old Masters. After achieving initial success as a portrait painter by the late 1690s, Santerre began to branch out into the fields of genre painting and, in which he combined the fantasy portrait of Northern tradition, as seen in the art of Rembrandt and Gerrit Dou, with the allegorical portrait, then fashionable in France. At the same time, he also painted history paintings and altarpieces of biblical and religious subjects, suffused with a strong erotic character; notable case of these is Susanna at the Bath of 1704, regarded among Santerre's best known works. Santerre's successes gained the attention from the French royalty, notably including King Louis XIV and Philippe II, Duke of Orléans; from 1715 and until his death, Santerre served as a court painter for the Duke of Orleans.

Santerre's work brought him a controversial reputation, in light of his association with the French Regency era; it was during the 19th and 20th centuries when it met a broader appreciation. Santerre is regarded as a precursor of the Rococo era painting, as well as of both Neoclassical and Romantic painting, and was said to be an influence on subsequent generations of artists during the said eras. (Note: Artists from subsequent generations, of whose Santerre was regarded as either a forerunner or influence, include Antoine Watteau, Jean-Marc Nattier, François Boucher, Pierre-Antoine Baudouin, Jean-Honoré Fragonard, and Pierre-Paul Prud'hon.)

== Life and work ==
Born in Magny-en-Vexin near Pontoise on 23 March 1651, Jean-Baptiste Santerre was the twelfth child of André Santerre, a merchant. He was apprenticed to the portrait painter François Lemaire (1620–1688), before entering the studio of the history painter Bon Boullogne. Although he executed some history paintings, he began to specialize in portraits early in his career, influenced by his French contemporaries Hyacinthe Rigaud and François de Troy; at the same time, Santerre became among the first painters in France to bring Dutch and Flemish influences, notably from Rembrandt and Anthony van Dyck. In his art, Santerre made an original contribution by combining the fantasy portrait of Northern tradition with the allegorical portrait, then fashionable in French painting.

Having been approved (agrée) into the Academy of Painting and Sculpture in 1698, Santerre was accepted as full member (reçu) in October 1704, after presenting Susanna at the Bath, now in the Louvre, and an untraced portrait of the painter Noël Coypel; also in 1704, he exhibited some of his works at the Salon. Santerre's success at the Academy provided him official commissions for more conventional portraits, among them that of the mother of King Louis XV, Marie Adélaïde of Savoy, influenced by the elder Troy's portrait of the Duchess of Maine. Beside from Susanna at the Bath and a Weeping Magdalen, Santerre's religious paintings notably include Ecstasy of Saint Teresa, a commission by King Louis XIV for the Chapel of Versailles that caused a scandal in ecclesiastical circles, given the subject's erotic character inspired by Bernini's statue.

Towards 1712, Santerre received a pension from the King, as well as a studio and lodging in the Louvre. After Louis XIV's death in 1715, Santerre became an ordinary painter at the court of the Regent of France, the Duke of Orleans; among his later works are a portrait of the Regent now in the Birmingham Museum and Art Gallery, exhibiting an influence from Rigaud's portraiture, and a double portrait in the Palace of Versailles of the Regent and his mistress, Madame de Parabère, with the latter appearing as Minerva. Adam and Eve of c. 1716–1717, also believed to be a double portrait of the Regent and Madame de Parabère, turned out to be Santerre's last work, made shortly before his death on 21 November 1717; on his death, he was reputed to have destroyed a notebook of his nude studies, which he considered to be indecent.

== In culture ==
Santerre's death is the subject of an 1836 painting by Joseph-Léon-Roland de Lestang-Parade (1810–1881), first exhibited in Paris during that year's Salon and now hosted in the Museum of Fine Arts, Lyon.

== Gallery ==
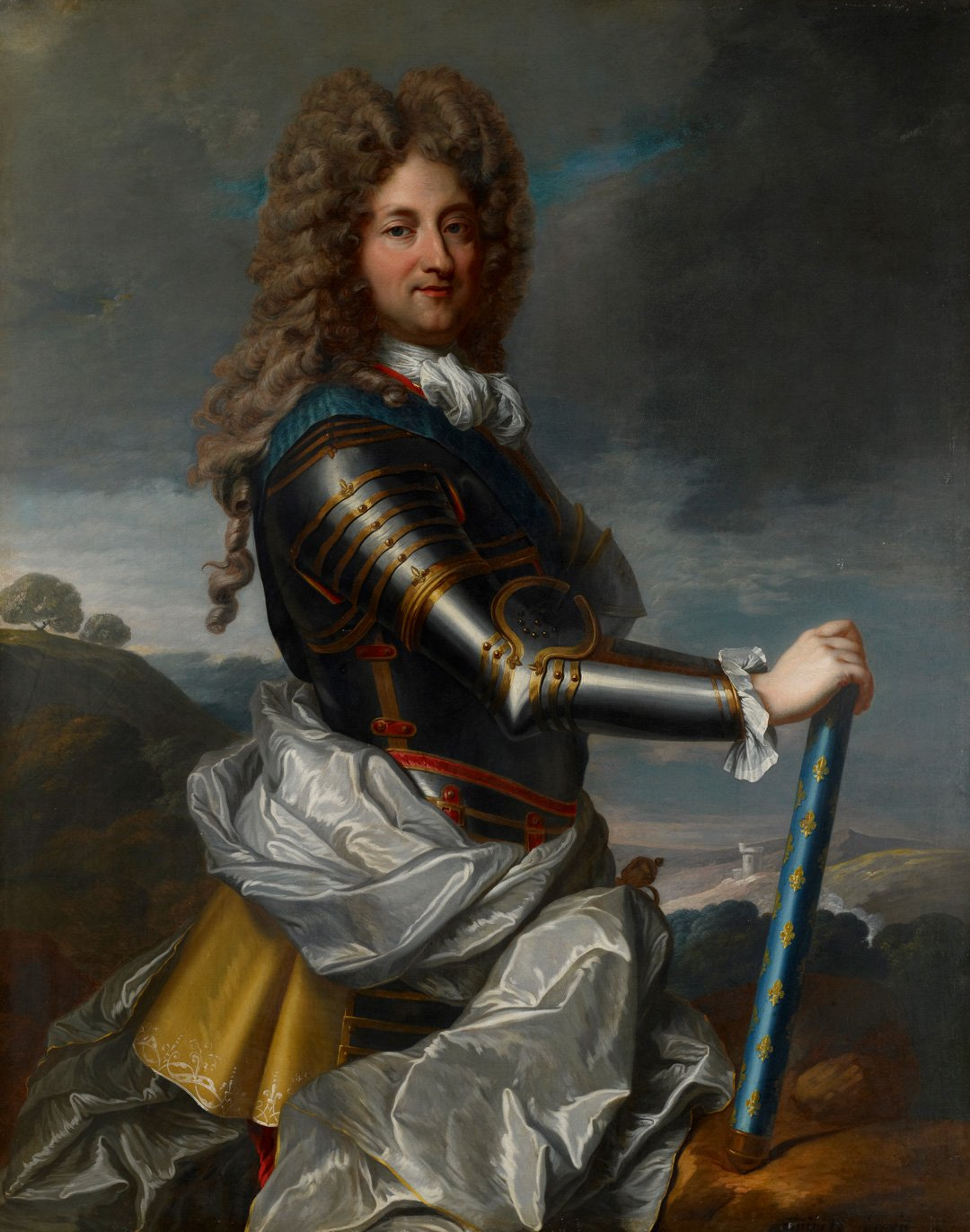
Philippe II, Duke of Orléans, c. 1710–1717; Museum and Art Gallery, Birmingham

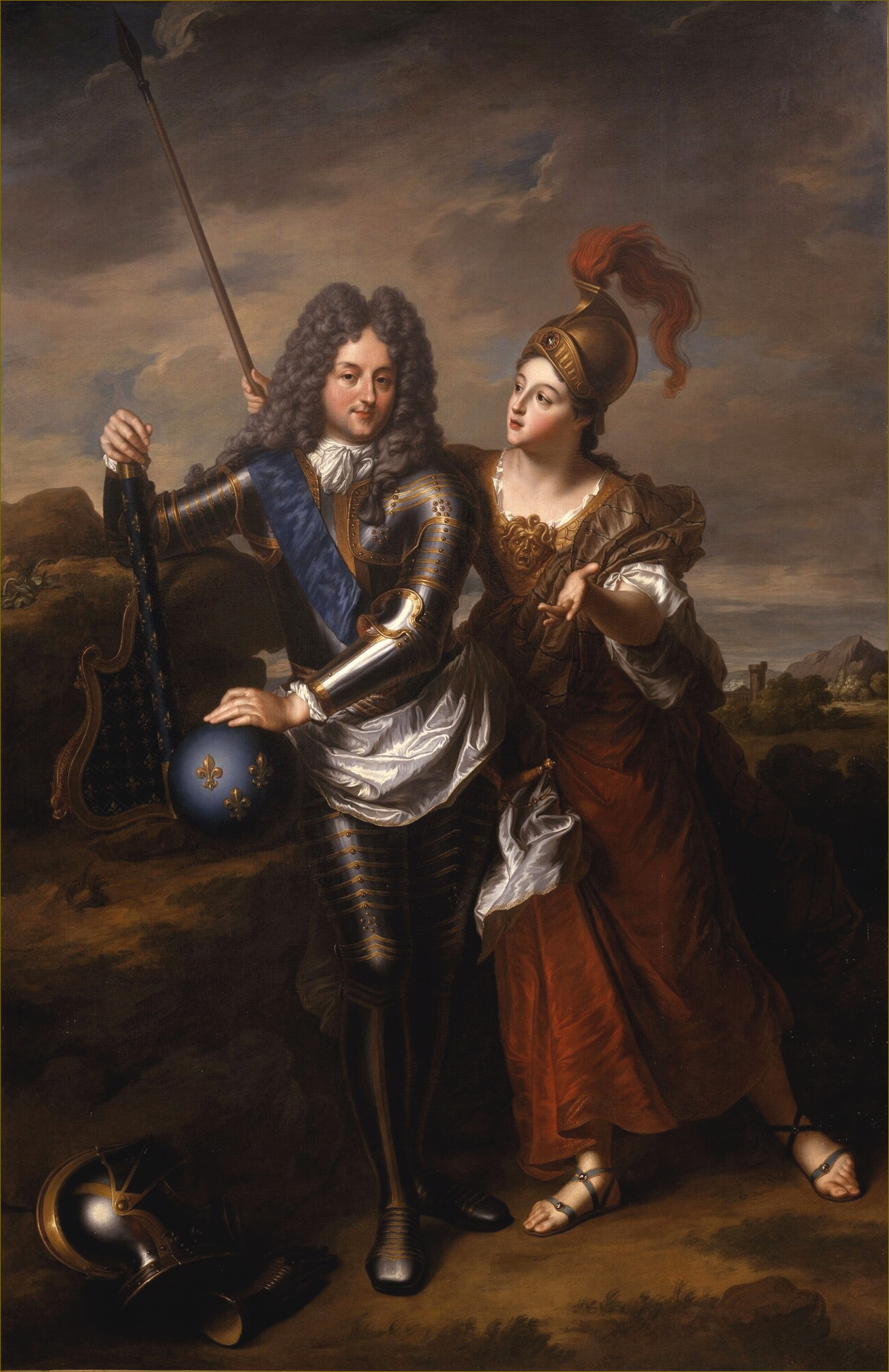
Philippe II, Duke of Orléans, and Madame de Parabère as Minerva, c. 1715–1716; Palace of Versailles

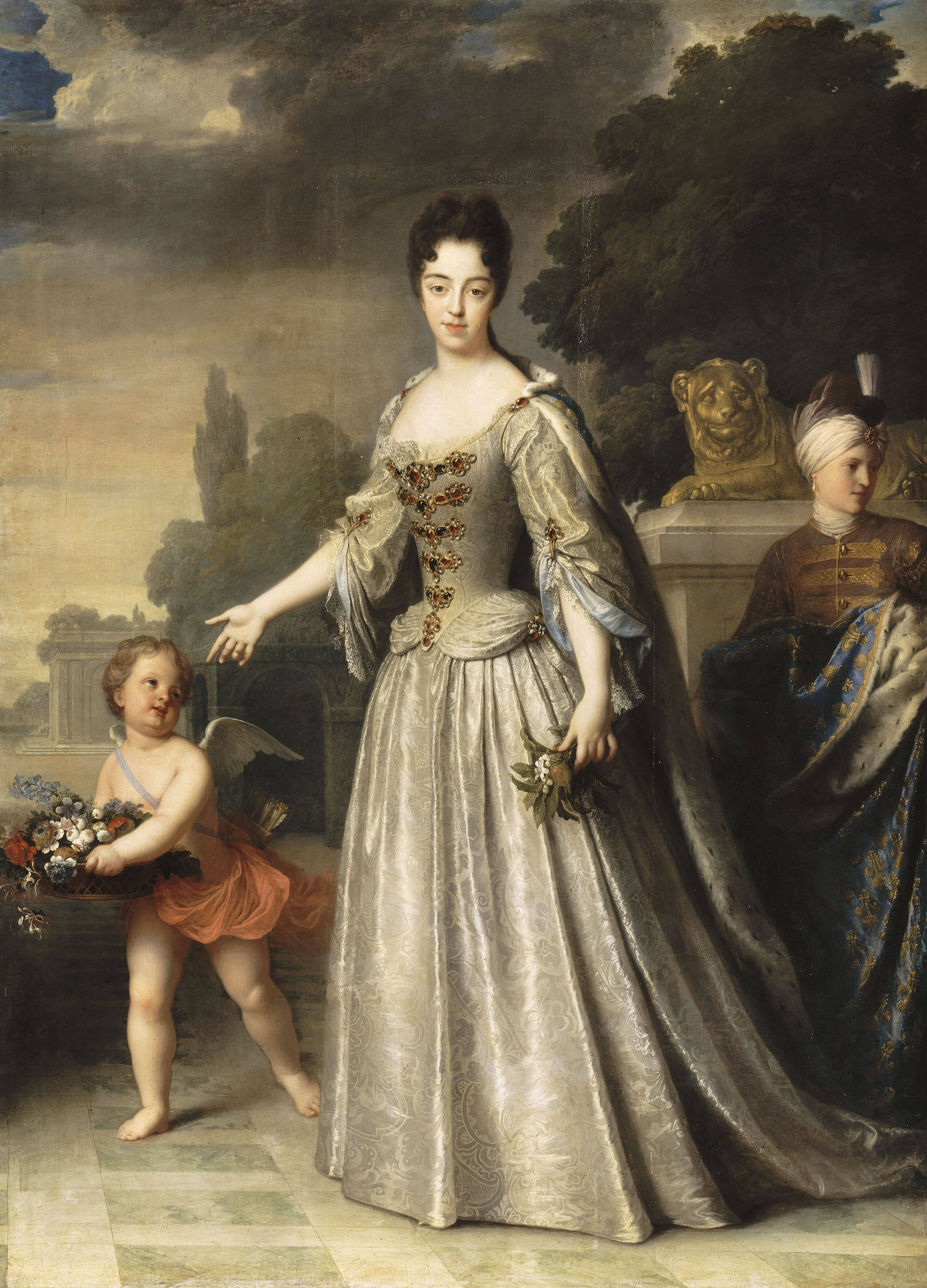
Marie Adélaïde of Savoy, 1709; Palace of Versailles

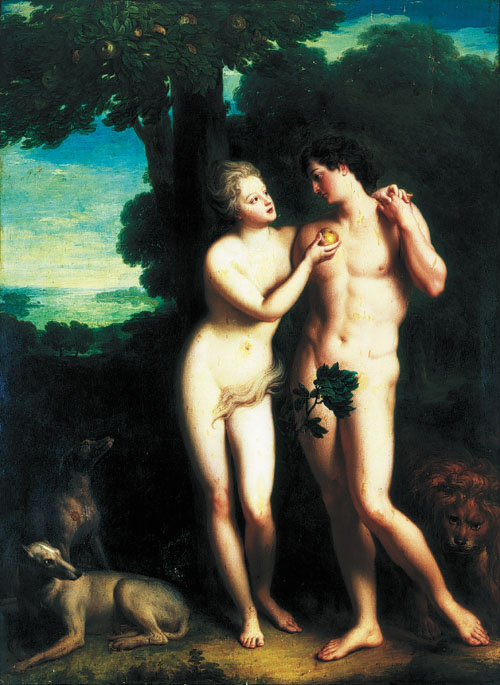
Adam and Eve, c. 1716–1717; David Roche Foundation, Melbourne

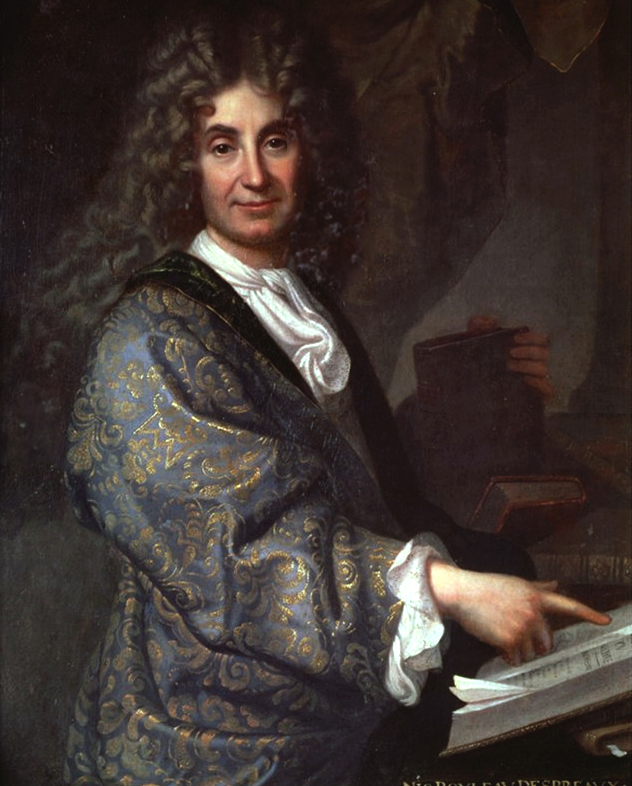
Nicolas Boileau, 1690s; Musée des Beaux-Arts de Lyon

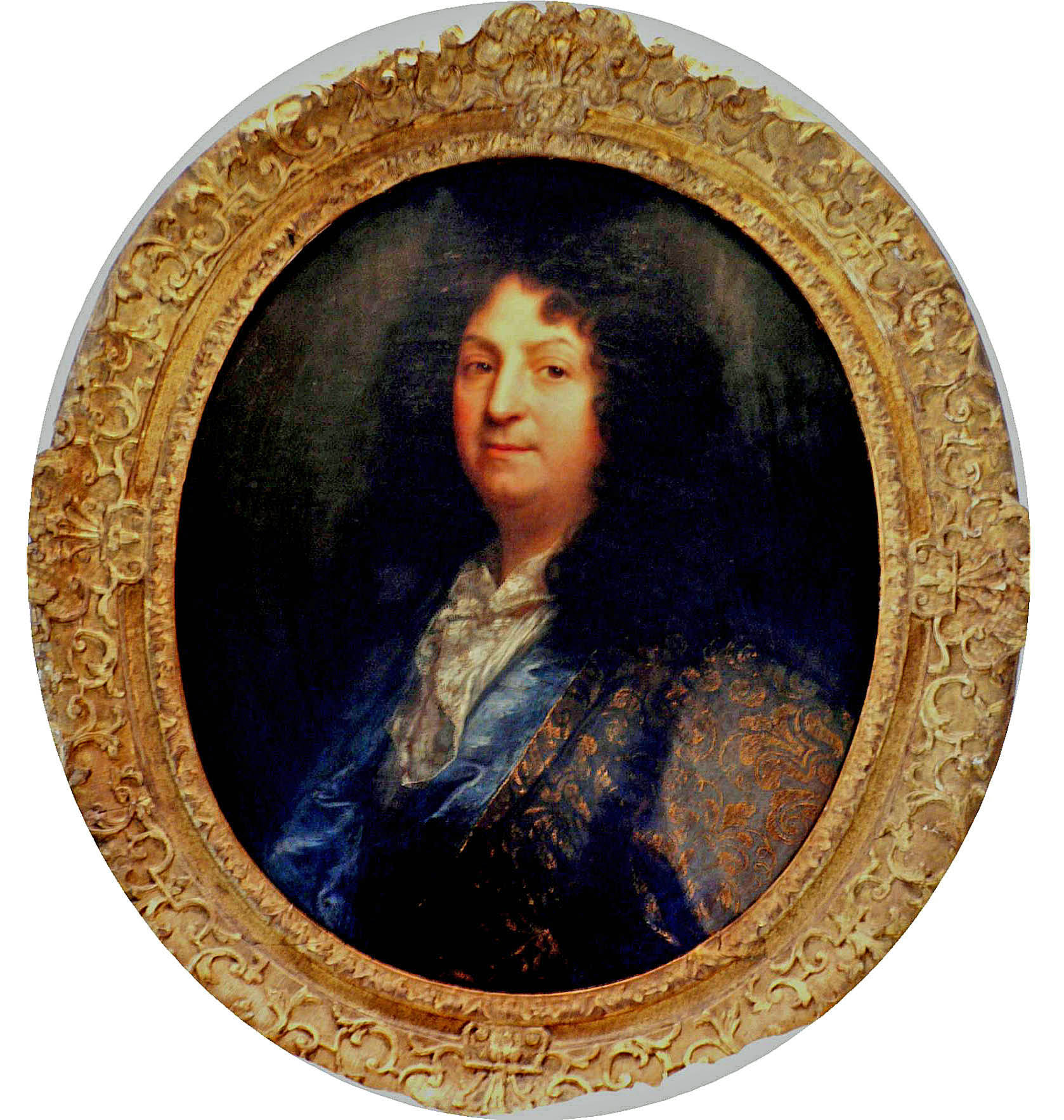
Jean Racine, whereabouts unknown

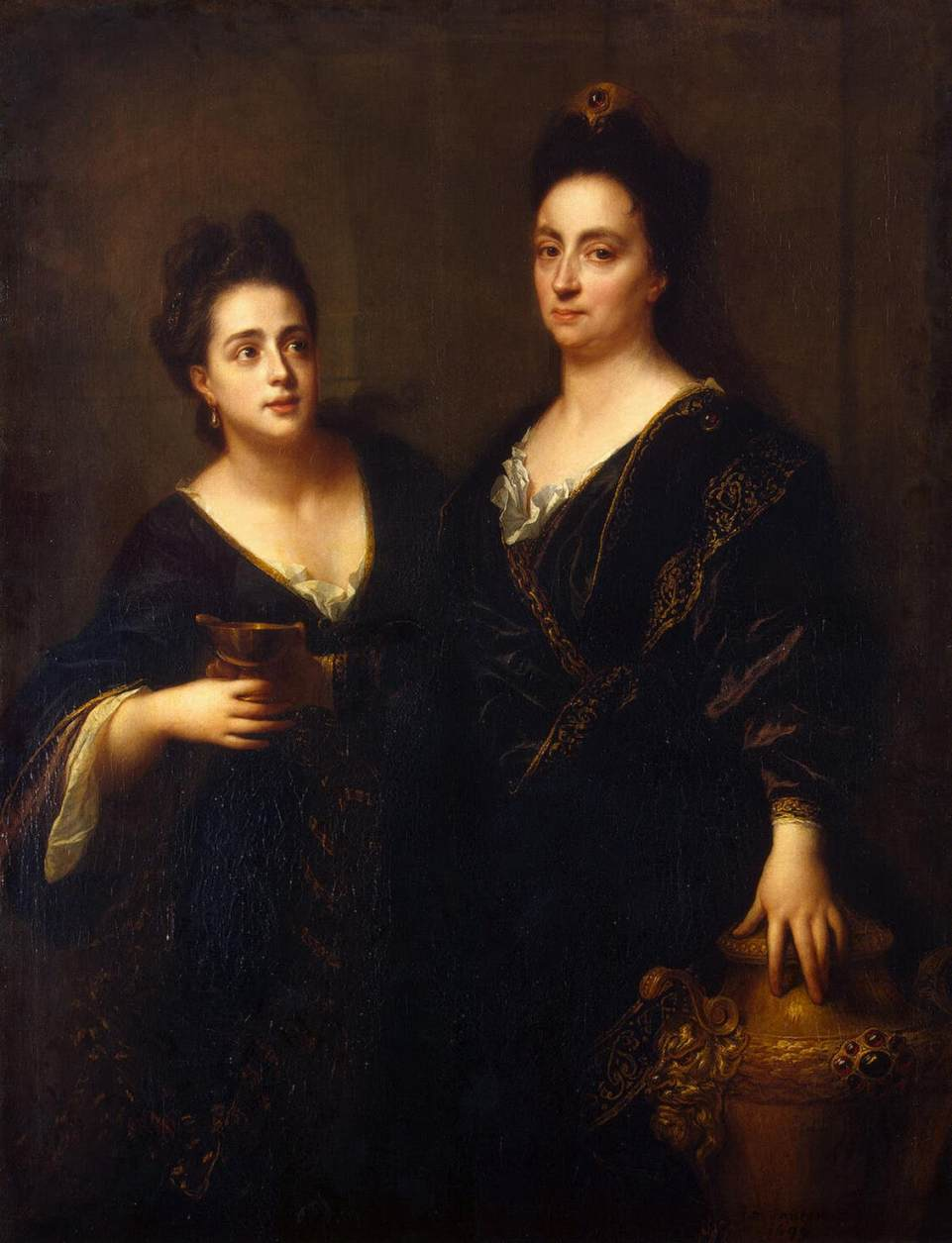
Two Actresses, 1699; Hermitage Museum, Saint Petersburg

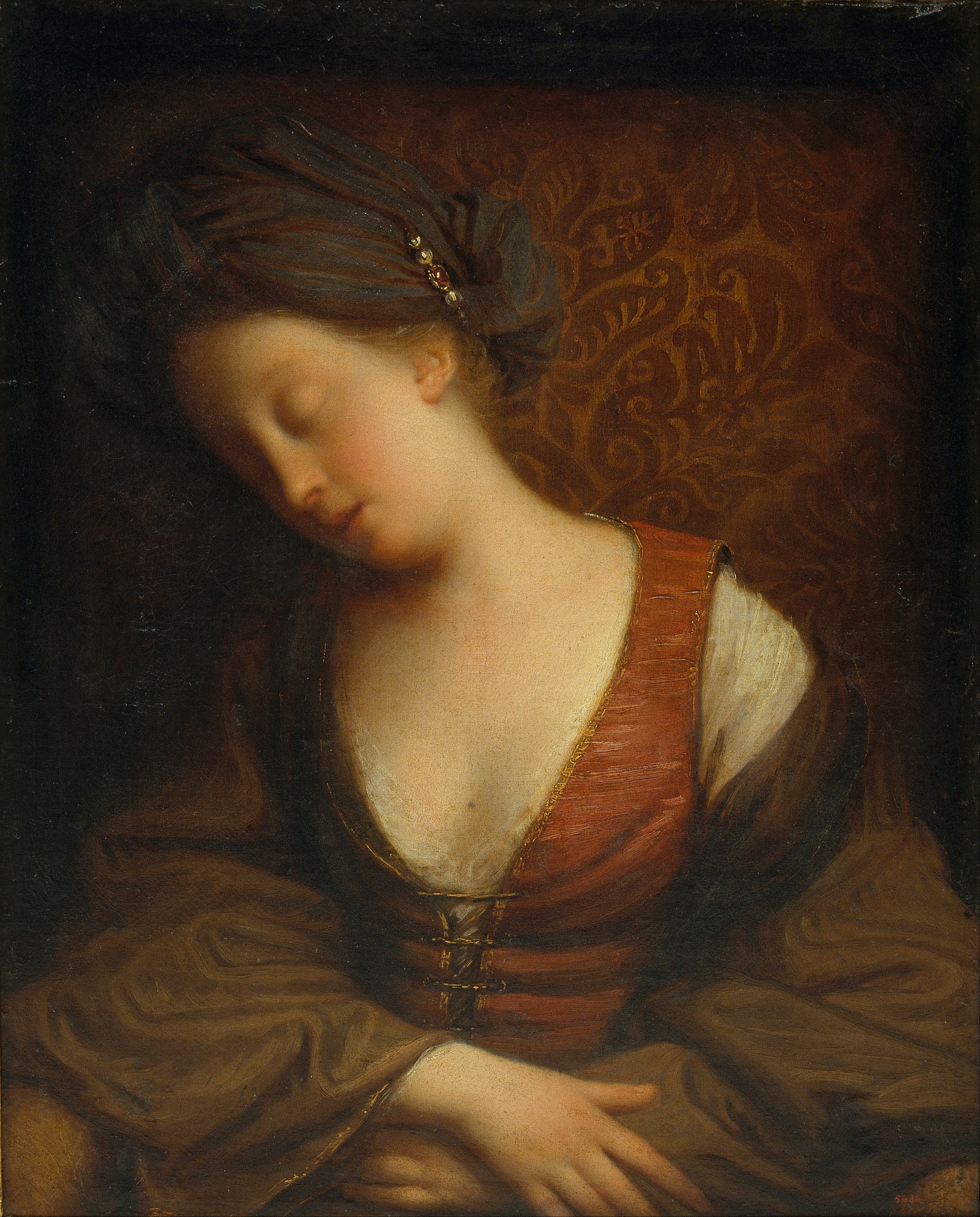
Young Woman Sleeping, c. 1710; Museu Nacional d'Art de Catalunya, Barcelona

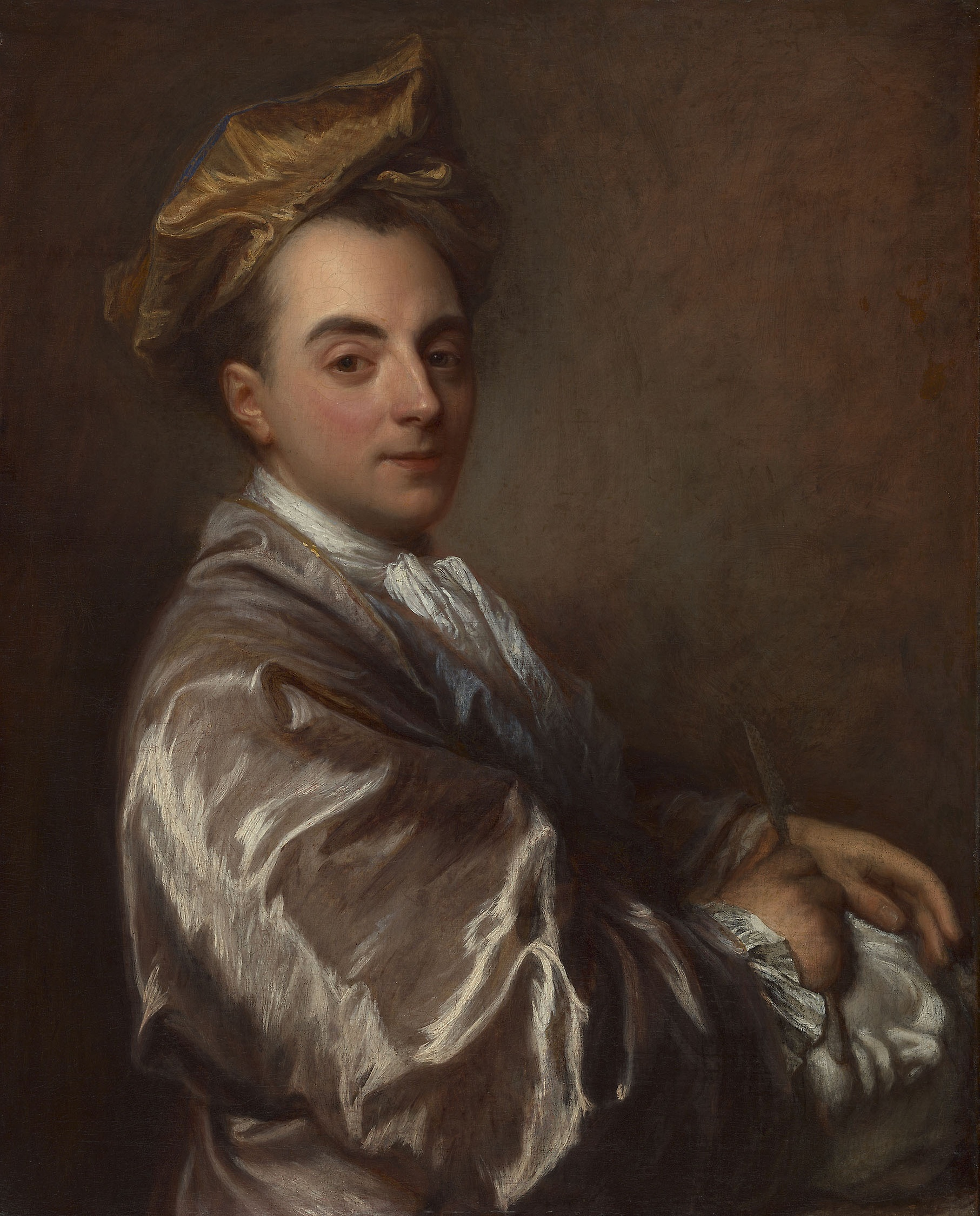
Portrait of a Sculptor, 1700s; Art Institute of Chicago

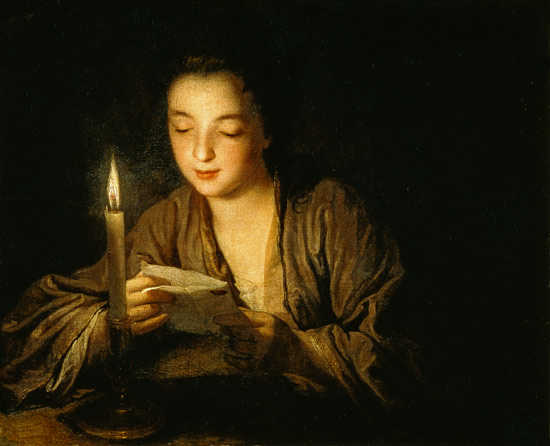
Girl with a Candle, c. 1700; Pushkin Museum, Moscow

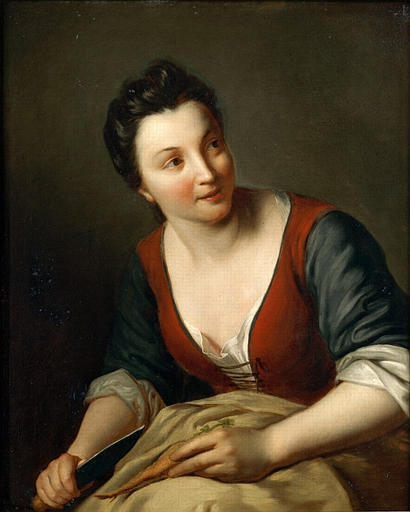
A Kitchen Maid; Musée d'Arts de Nantes

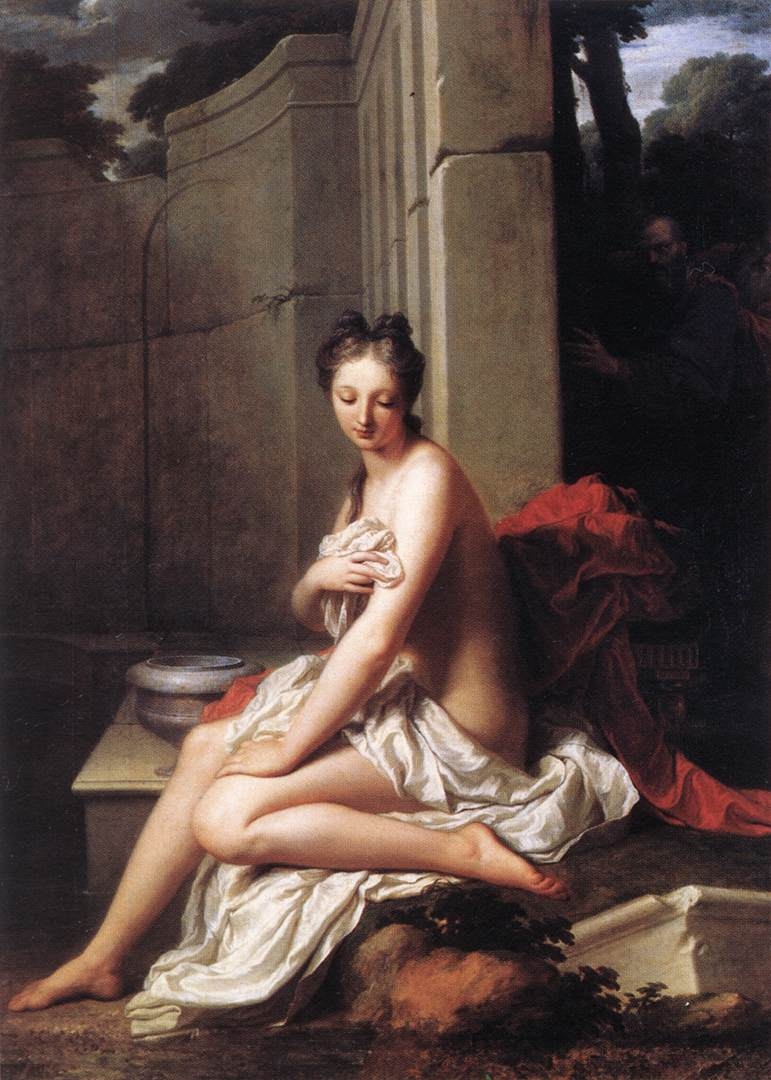
Susanna at the Bath, c. 1704; Louvre

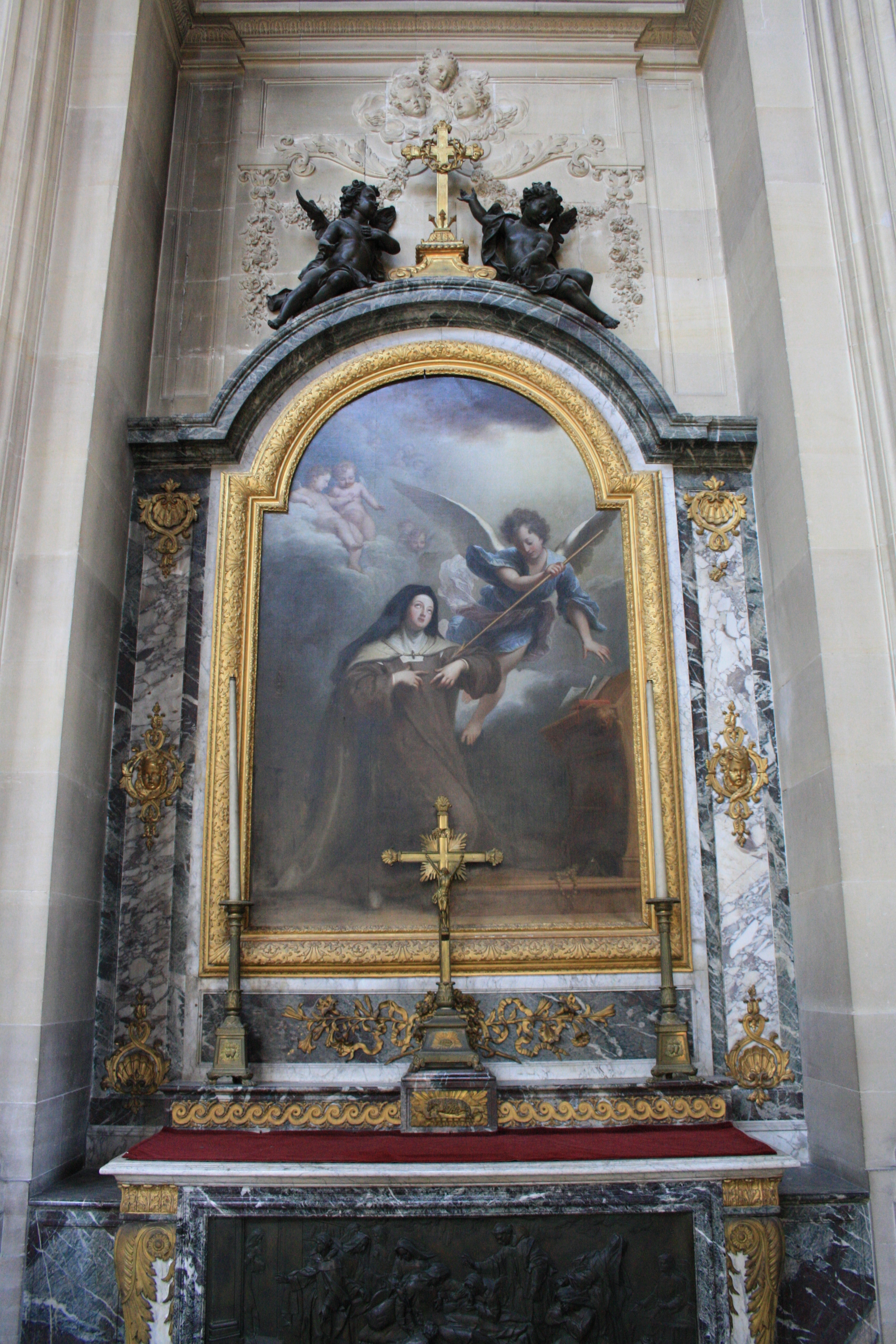
Ecstasy of Saint Teresa, 1710; Chapel of the Palace of Versailles

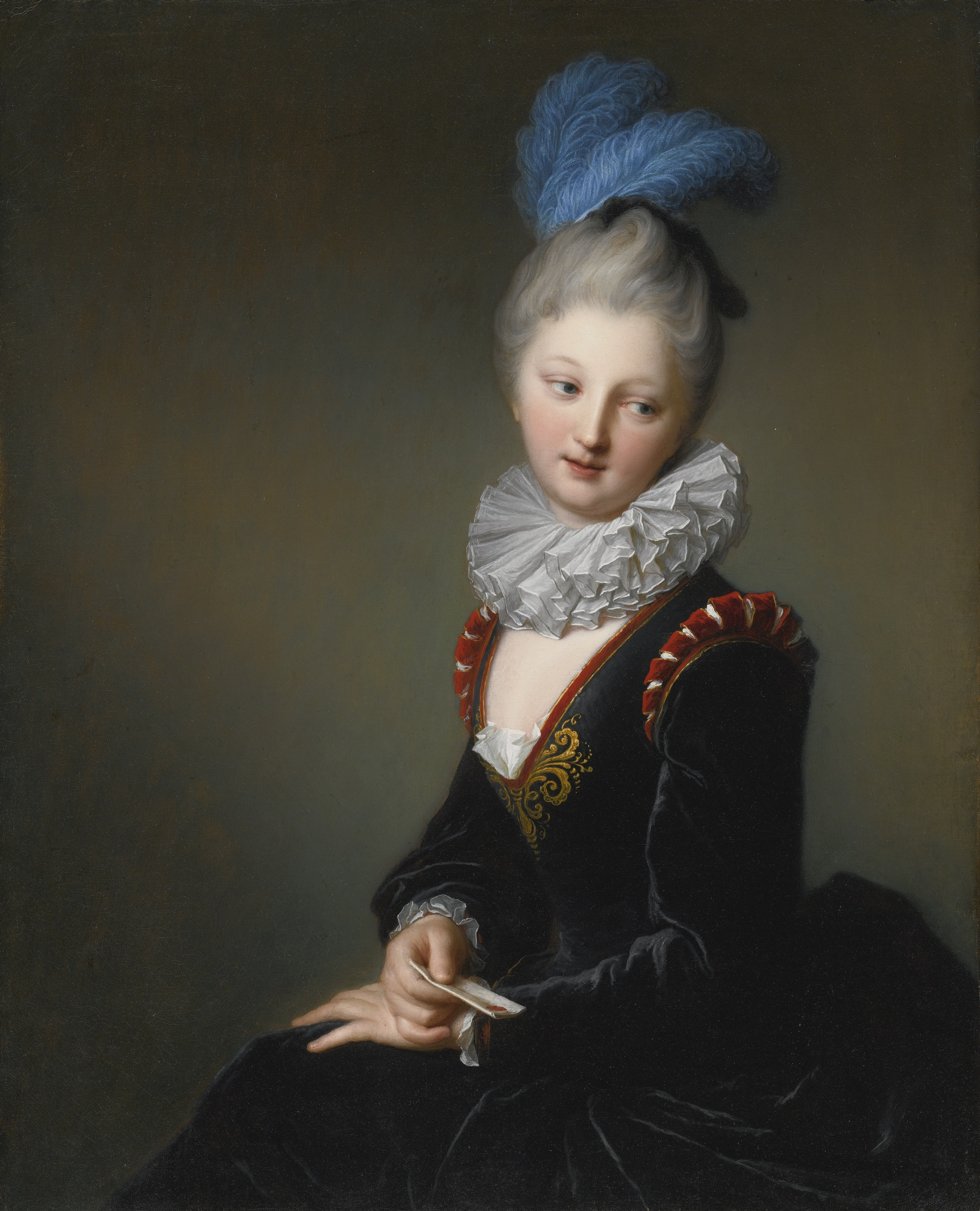
Young Lady with a Letter, the so-called Charlotte Desmares, c. 1708; auctioned at Sotheby's in 2013

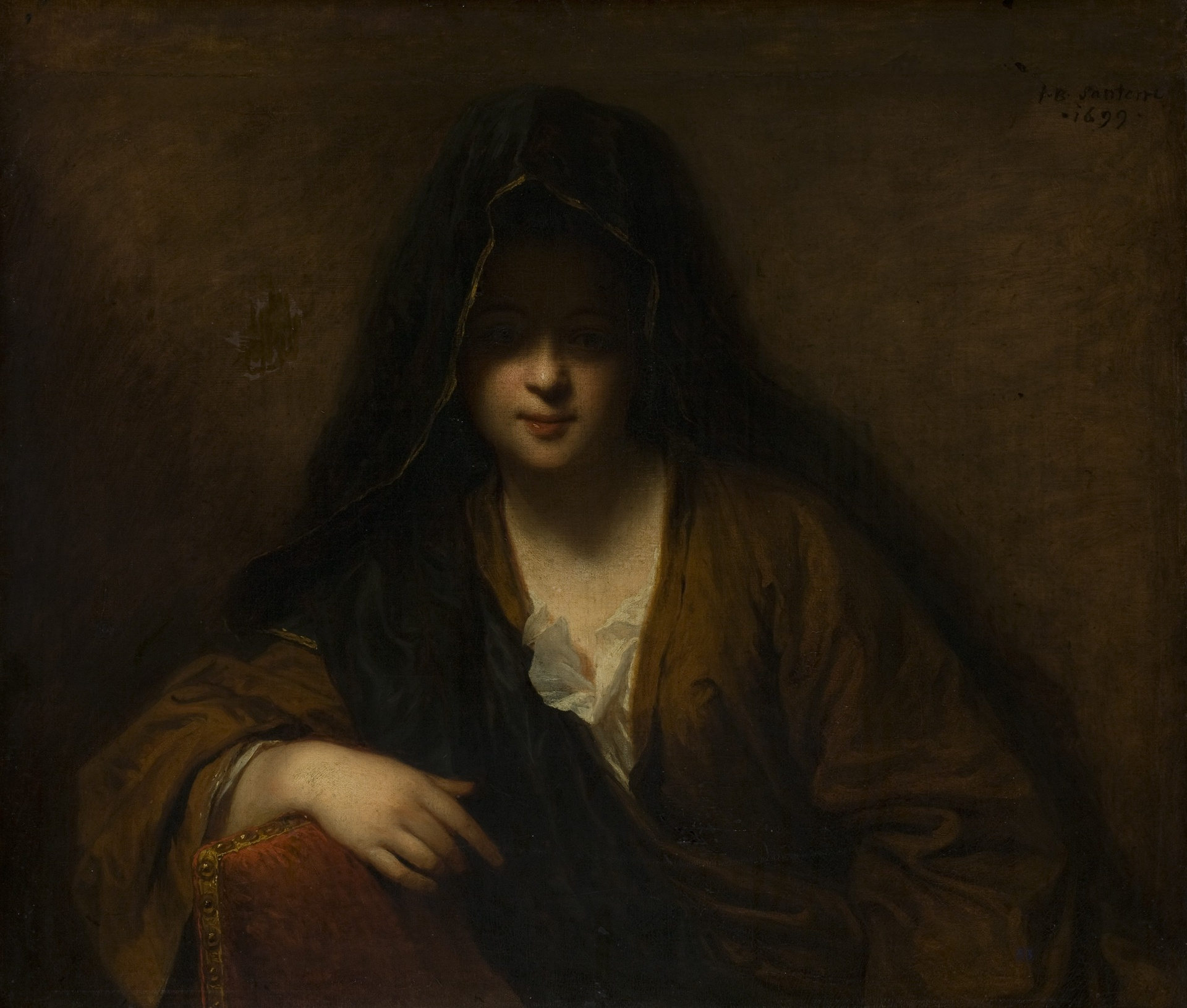
Young Lady with a Veil on Her Head, 1699; Hermitage Museum, Saint Petersburg

== Bibliography ==
Primary sources

- "Journal de Paris, qui commence par l'Eloge de feu M. Santerre". Le Nouveau Mercure (in French). December 1717. pp. 185–194 – via Gallica.
- "Abregé de la vie de M. Santerre Peintre". Le Nouveau Mercure (in French). September 1718. pp. 69–75 – via Gallica.
- Dezallier d'Argenville, Antoine Joseph (1762) [1745]. Abregé de la vie des fameux peintres. Vol. 4. Paris: De Bure l'aîné. pp. 258–262. OCLC 1038747111 – via the Internet Archive.
- Montaiglon, Anatole de (1880). Procès-verbaux de l'Académie royale de peinture et de sculpture, 1648-1793 (in French). Vol. 3. Paris: J. Baur. OCLC 1050795149 – via the Internet Archive.
- Montaiglon, Anatole de (1881). Procès-verbaux de l'Académie royale de peinture et de sculpture, 1648-1793 (in French). Vol. 4. Paris: J. Baur. OCLC 1050846128 – via the Internet Archive.

General studies

- Lesné, Claude (1988). "Jean-Baptiste Santerre, 1651–1717". Bulletin de la Société de l'histoire de l'art français: 75–118. ISSN 0301-4126. OCLC 888444852.
- Lesné, Claude; Waro, Françoise (2011). Jean-Baptiste Santerre: 1651–1717 (in French). Saint-Ouen-l'Aumône: Éditions du Valhermeil. ISBN 978-2-35467-088-7. OCLC 1194420634 – via the Internet Archive.
- Potiquet, Alfred (1878) [1876]. Jean-Baptiste Santerre, peintre: sa vie et son oeuvre (in French) (2nd ed.). Magny-en-Vexin: Petit. OCLC 458077934.

Additional studies

- Blunt, Anthony (1973). Art and Architecture in France, 1500 to 1700. Harmondsworth; New York: Penguin Books. ISBN 0-14-056104-8. OCLC 1147992003 – via the Internet Archive.
- Brookner, Anita (1972). Greuze: The Rise and Fall of an Eighteenth-Century Phenomenon. Greenwich, Conn.: New York Graphic Society. pp. 38, 40, 42–43. ISBN 9780821204832. OCLC 1244792294. SBN 8212-0483-1 – via the Internet Archive.
- Gay, Claire (1972). Eighteenth Century Painting. Translated from the French by Paul Eve. New York: Funk & Wagnalls. pp. 19, 173–174. OCLC 1033562355 – via the Internet Archive.
- Huyghe, René (1965). La peinture francaise des XVIIe et XVIIIe siecles. Paris: Flammarion. p. 58. OCLC 1150090975 – via the Internet Archive.
- Kalnein, Wend Graf [in German]; Levey, Michael (1972). Art and Architecture of the Eighteenth Century in France. Harmondsworth: Penguin Books. OCLC 1008263215. SBN 14-056037-8.
- Levey, Michael (1966). Rococo to Revolution: Major Trends in Eighteenth-Century Painting. London: Thames and Hudson. OCLC 1036855531 – via the Internet Archive.
- Marcel, Pierre (1906). La peinture française au début du dix-huitième siècle, 1690-1721 (in French). Paris: G. Baranger. OCLC 1157122577 – via the Internet Archive.
- Mérot, Alain (1995) [1994]. French Painting in the Seventeenth Century [La peinture française au XVIIe siècle]. New Haven, London: Yale University Press. pp. 204–205, 285, 287, 300–301; pl. 230, 341. ISBN 9780300065503. OCLC 983926912 – via the Internet Archive.
- Muehsam, Gerd, ed. (1970). French Painters and Paintings from the Fourteenth Century to Post-Impressionism. New York: Ungar. pp. 161–163. ISBN 9780804432108. OCLC 1193947997. SBN 8044-3210-4 – via the Internet Archive.
- Percival, Melissa (2012). Fragonard and the Fantasy Figure: Painting the Imagination. Farnham; Burlington, VT: Ashgate. ISBN 978-1-4094-0137-7. OCLC 780536108 – via Google Books.
- Réau, Louis [in French] (1925–1926). Histoire de la peinture du XVIIIe siècle (in French). Bruxelles, Paris: G. Van Oest. vol. 1, p. 4. OCLC 491647984.
- Thuillier, Jacques; Châtelet, Albert (1964). French Painting. Geneva: Skira. OCLC 1193944713 – via the Internet Archive.
- Viardot, Louis (1884) [1868]. Les merveilles de la peinture. Vol. 2 (4th ed.). Paris: Hachette. pp. 302–303. OCLC 1048225915 – via the Internet Archive.
- Wakefield, David F. (1984). French Eighteenth-Century Painting. New York: Alpine Fine Arts Collection. pp. 12, 117, 177. ISBN 0-88168-024-9. OCLC 1149209513 – via the Internet Archive.

Reference works

- Bénézit, Emmanuel (2006) [first published in French in 1911–1923]. Benezit Dictionary of Artists. Vol. 12. Paris: Gründ. pp. 396–397. ISBN 2-7000-3082-6 – via the Internet Archive.
- Brême, Dominique (1996). "Santerre, Jean-Baptiste". In Turner, Jane (ed.). The Dictionary of Art. Vol. 27. New York: Grove's Dictionaries. p. 789. ISBN 1-884446-00-0. OCLC 1033667798 – via the Internet Archive.
- Constans, Claire (1979). "Santerre (Jean-Baptiste)". In Laclotte, Michel (ed.). Petit Larousse de la Peinture. Vol. 2. Paris: Librairie Larousse. p. 1659. ISBN 2-03-020149-9.
- Felici, Lucio, ed. (2000). Encyclopédie de l'art (in French). Paris: Le Livre de poche. p. 913. ISBN 2253053031. OCLC 1193410004 – via the Internet Archive.
- Kepetzis, Ekaterini (2018). "Santerre, Jean-Baptiste". In Beyer, Andreas; Savoy, Bénédicte & Tegethoff, Wolf (eds.). Allgemeines Künstlerlexikon (in German). Vol. 101. Berlin, Boston: De Gruyter. pp. 136–137. ISBN 978-3-11-023267-7.
- Laclotte, Michel; Cuzin, Jean-Pierre, eds. (1999). Dictionnaire de la peinture (in French). Paris: Larousse. p. 913. ISBN 2-03-511441-1.
- Maillard, Robert, ed. (1975). "Santerre, Jean-Baptiste". Dictionnaire universel de la peinture (in French). Vol. 6. Paris: Robert. p. 66. ISBN 2-850-36059-7.
- Myers, Bernard S., ed. (1969). "Santerre, Jean-Baptiste". McGraw-Hill Dictionary of Art. Vol. 5. New York: McGraw-Hill. p. 101. OCLC 1150312272 – via the Internet Archive.
- Osborne, Harold, ed. (1970). The Oxford Companion to Art (1989 reprint). Oxford: Clarendon Press. p. 1039. ISBN 0-19-866107-X. OCLC 1036799238 – via the Internet Archive.
- Vlasov, Viktor G. [in Russian] (1995–1997). Стили в искусстве (in Russian). Vol. 3. Saint Petersburg: Kol'na. p. 300. ISBN 5-88737-010-6. OCLC 605179863.
- Vollmer, Hans, ed. (1935). "Santerre, Jean-Baptiste". Allgemeines Lexikon der bildenden Künstler (in German). Vol. 29. Leipzig: E. A. Seemann. pp. 429–430. OCLC 889110751.
