= Louise-Charlotte de Foix-Rabat, comtesse de Sabran =

Louise-Charlotte de Foix-Rabat, comtesse de Sabran (1693–1768), was a French aristocrat. She was the official mistress of the Philippe II, Duke of Orléans, who was the regent of France during the minority of the infant King Louis XV.

== Life ==
She was the daughter of Gaston de Foix, comte de Rabat, and Dorothée Théodore de Poudens de Villepinte, and married in 1714 to Jean-Honoré, comte de Sabran et de Forcalquier (d. 1750).

After being married she was, in accordance with contemporary custom in French nobility, able to have lovers, and she entered into a relationship with the Duke of Orléans, who had discontinued his affairs with Marie Louise Madeleine Victoire d'Argenton and Charlotte Desmares and was not able to enter into an affair with Marie-Madeleine de Parabère, whose mother and spouse refused to allow it.

She was the mistress of the Duke of Orléans between 1714 and 1716, when she was replaced as main favorite by the now widowed and motherless Marie-Madeleine de Parabère. The relationship was not exclusive - the regent and numerous temporary lovers, and she was the mistress of Armand de Vignerot du Plessis in parallel to the regent.

Sabran was described as an intelligent, ambitious and entertaining beauty. As favorite, she gained a lot of advantages for herself, her spouse and her friends through her position. She successfully used her position to benefit the careers and acquire lucrative offices and pensions for her friends and relatives. However, her attempts to gain influence in state affairs after the duke became a regent in 1715 was not successful, as the regent refused to allow it. On a famous occasion, she attempted to extract political secrets from the regent when he was drunk, upon which the regent placed her before a mirror and asked her: "How can such a beautiful mouth speak such nasty words?"

Sabran continued to be an intimate and influential friend of the Regent even after their relationship was discontinued, and was a known figure of his circle and participator of his court life during his entire regency. On several occasions, she introduced the regent to prospective lovers and because of that, she was slandered as a pimp and a brothel madam. In 1720 she introduced the Regent to Marie-Thérèse Blonel de Phalaris, who became the rival and successor of Marie-Madeleine de Parabère, and in 1723, she introduced the Regent to Mlle Houel, who became the mistress of the Regent a short time before he took back Phalaris as his main mistress.
