= Suite d'Armide, ou Jérusalem délivrée =

French Opera by Duke Philipp II, duc d'Orleans

Suite d'Armide, ou Jérusalem délivrée is a 1712 French opera in a prologue and five acts by Duke Philippe II, Duke of Orléans, the future Regent of France. The libretto by the Baron de Longepierre was based on Torquato Tasso's Gerusalemme liberata, concerning the defeat of Saracen forces by Christian armies as described in Canto XIII..

The opera was performed in the Galerie des cerfs of the Château de Fontainebleau in June 2023, by the Chœur de Chambre de Namur, Cappella Mediterranea and soloists conducted by Leonardo García-Alarcón. Philippe d’Orléans had already staged one opera with his music teacher Gervais in 1705, Penthée. Both the operas share atypical style and orchestration.

== Roles ==
- Herminie
- Armide
- La Voix de Clorinde
- Une Suivante d'Armide
- Une Nymphe
- Renaud
- Adraste
- Alcaste
- Un Vieux Berger
- Vaffrin
- Un Guerrier
- Tancrède
- Ismen
- Tissapherne

== Recording ==
Cappella Mediterranea directed by Leonardo García Alarcón.
