= Rue Rambuteau =

Street in Paris, France

- Location within Paris
- Length: 975 m (3,199 ft)
- Width: 5.5 to 13 m (18 to 43 ft)
- Arrondissement: 1st, 3rd, 4th
- Coordinates: 48.861682°N 2.351447°E
- From: Rue des Archives
- To: Rue Coquillière

Construction
- Completion: 5 March 1838

The Rue Rambuteau (French pronunciation: [ʁy ʁɑ̃byto]) is a street in central Paris, France, named after the Count de Rambuteau who started the widening of the road prior to Haussmann's renovation of Paris. The philosopher Henri Lefebvre lived on the street and observed from his window the rhythms of everyday life at the intersection located behind the Centre Georges Pompidou.

== Location ==
The Rue Rambuteau connects the neighbourhood of Les Halles, in the 1st arrondissement, to the Marais district in the 4th arrondissement. It fronts the Forum of Les Halles and the north side of Centre Georges Pompidou, and marks the boundary between the 3rd and 4th arrondissements. It occupies a special place in the history of Paris, because it is the first street to pierce the medieval centre, during the reign of King Louis Philippe I, a few years before the great works of Baron Haussmann. The Rue Rambuteau has a length of 975 metres (3,199 ft) and a width of 13 metres (43 ft).

== History ==
The Rue Rambuteau was created by order of King Louis Philippe I dated 5 March 1838. In 1839, the street was given the name of the prefect of the Seine department, Claude Philibert Barthelot, Count Rambuteau. The new street absorbed the Rue des Ménétriers, between the Rue Beaubourg and the Rue Saint-Martin; the Rue de la Chanverrerie (Note: The Rue de la Chanverrerie was called the Rue de la Chanvrerie by Victor Hugo in Les Misérables, the high place of L'idylle rue Plumet et l'épopée rue Saint-Denis part IV of his work) between the Rue Saint-Denis and the Rue Mondétour; and the Rue Traînée between the Rue Montmartre et the Rue du Jour.

The prefect Rambuteau, at the request of residents, decided in 1834 to create a street 13 metres (43 ft) wide, an important dimension for the time. The centre of Paris had hitherto kept its medieval urban fabric composed mainly of narrow streets where traffic was difficult and hygiene was poor. Taking office in 1833, a year after a major cholera epidemic, Rambuteau decided to implement the hygienist theories of the time by cutting a wide path through the centre of Paris. A few years later, the prefect Haussmann would apply Rambuteau's principles on a much larger scale in boulevards such as the Boulevard de Sébastopol that crosses the Rue Rambuteau.

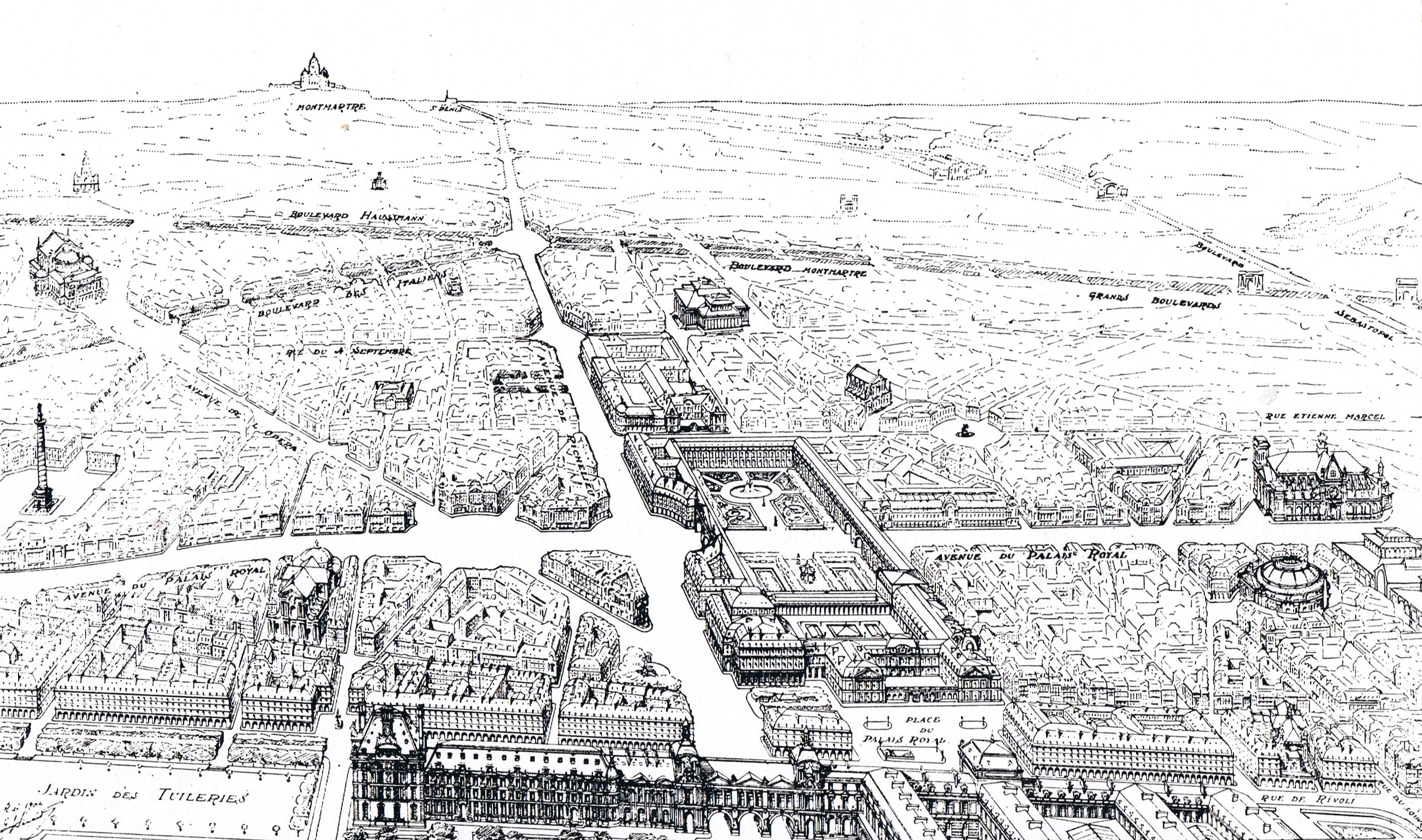
Hénard's proposed extension of the Rue Rambuteau running west through the Palais-Royal (lower centre)

In 1904, the visionary urban planner Eugène Hénard presented a project for a new major east–west crossing of Paris. The east–west artery, the new Avenue du Palais-Royal, would run along the route of the Rue Rambuteau, which would be expanded, through the Palais-Royal and into the Avenue de l'Opéra. The avenue would pass through arches cut through the wings of the Palais-Royal. It would intersect an expanded north–south Rue de Richelieu in a roundabout, cutting into the west side of the Palais-Royal. The entire project was discussed for several years, and in 1912 gave rise to great controversy within the Commission of Old Paris. However, the proposal did not gain official support.

== Buildings ==
- In 1853, the building at number 34 was the headquarters of the publishing house of Charles Durand (1804–1863), the poet, singer and patron of goguettes.
- The Centre Georges Pompidou.
- The Church of St. Eustache.
- The Forum des Halles.
- At number 50, the MK2 Beaubourg.

The Rue Rambuteau is served by the Rambuteau station at the Pompidou Centre and the Les Halles station at the Forum des Halles. The entrance to the latter station is inserted in the front of a building at no. 230.

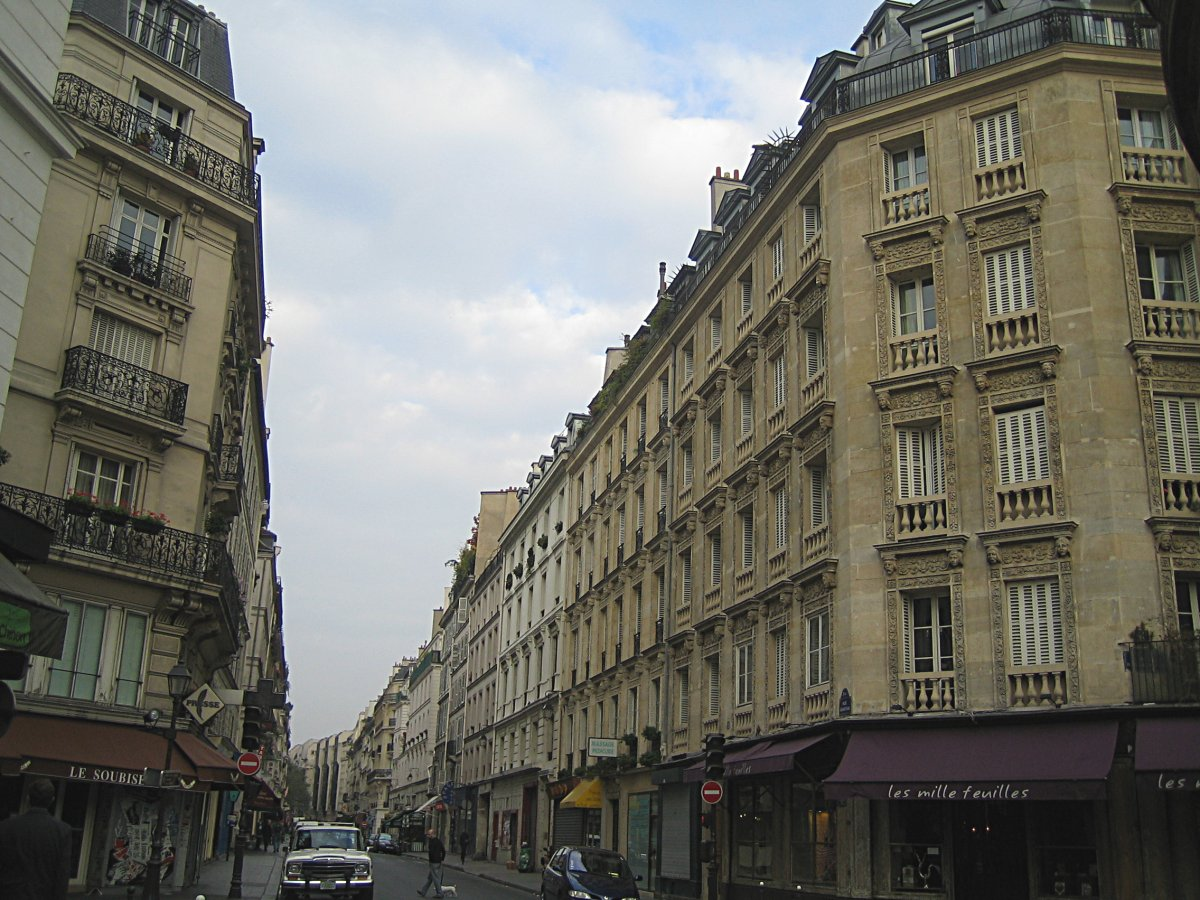
General view

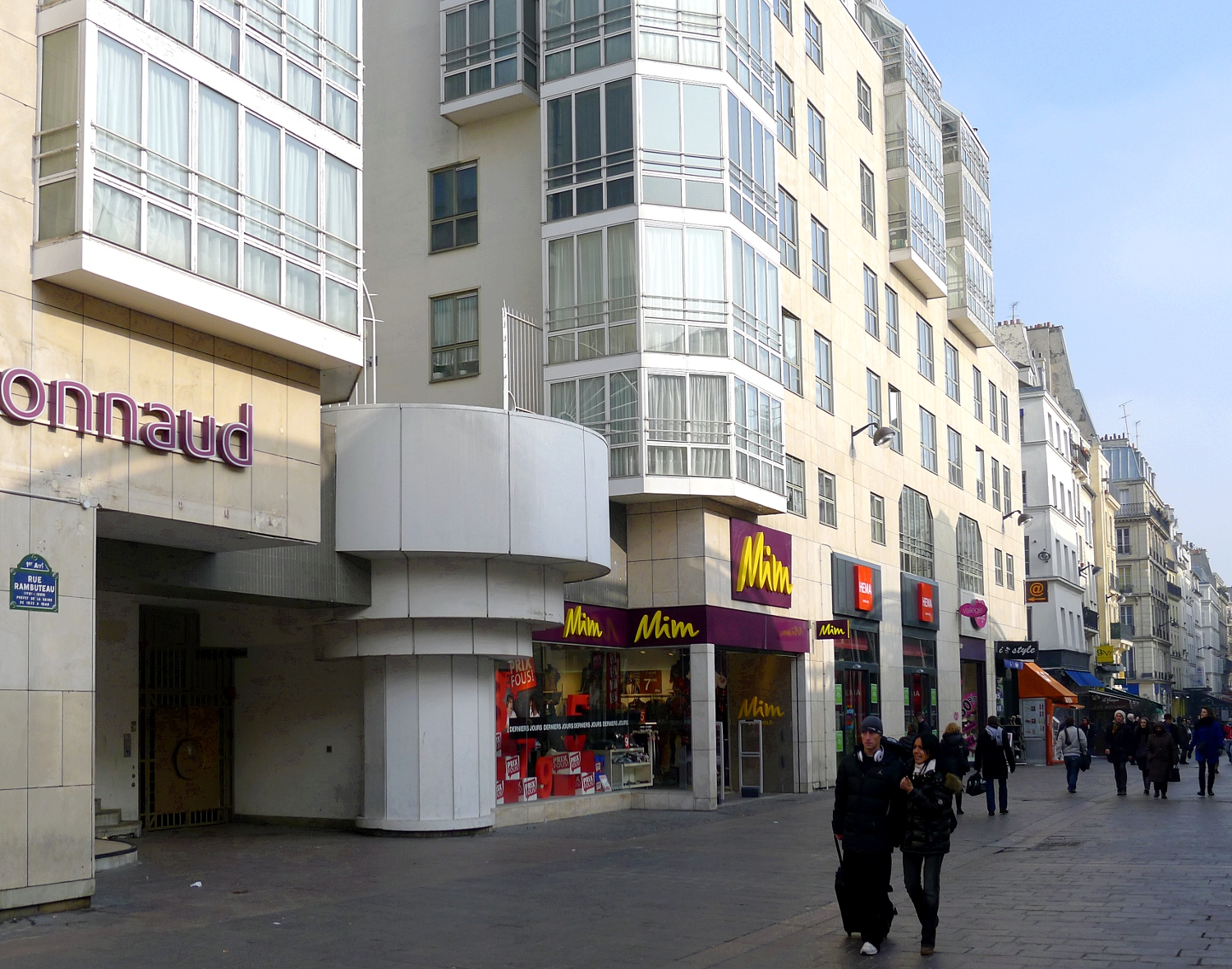
Rue Rambuteau on the forecourt of Les Halles

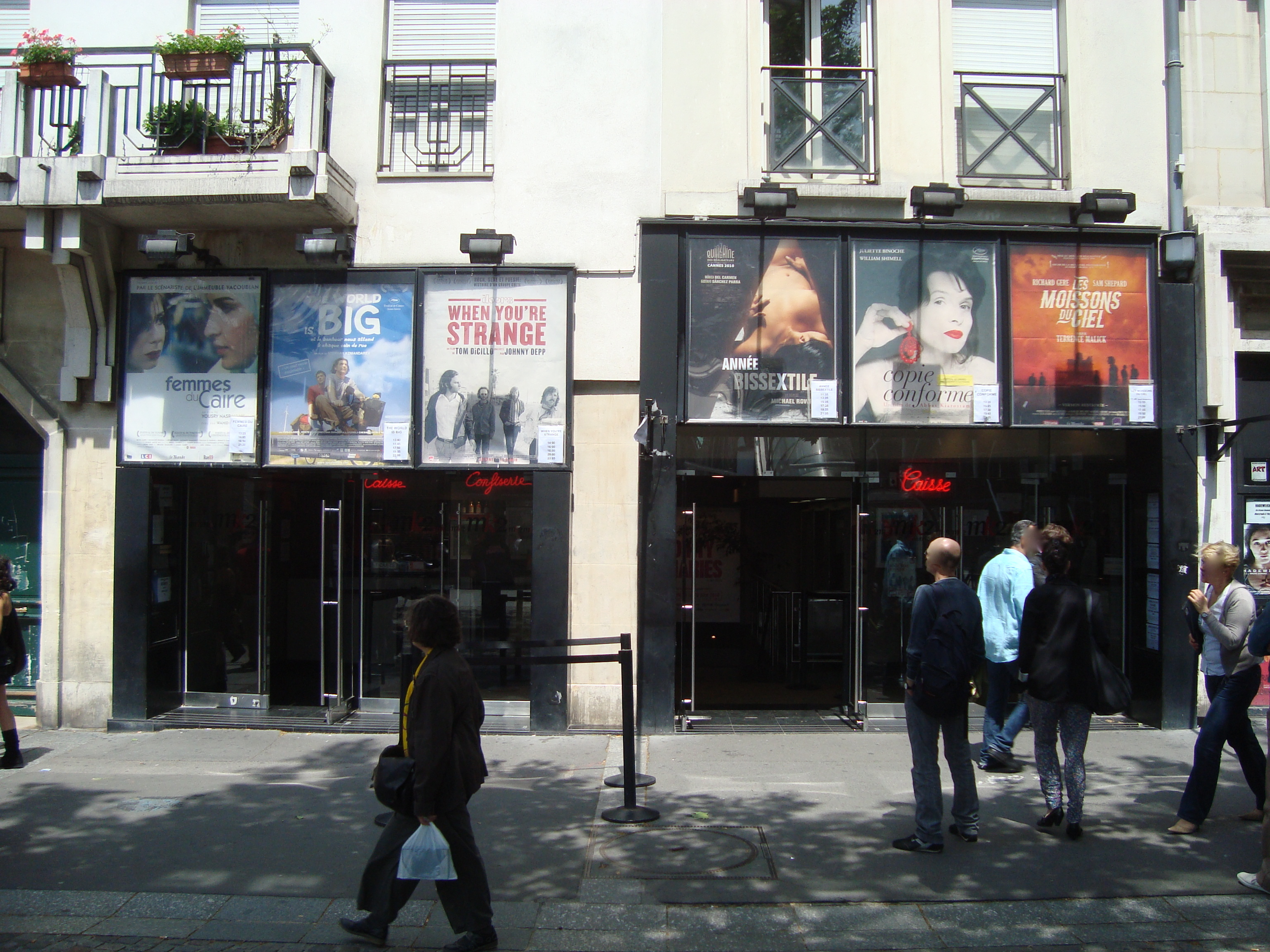
MK2 Beaubourg

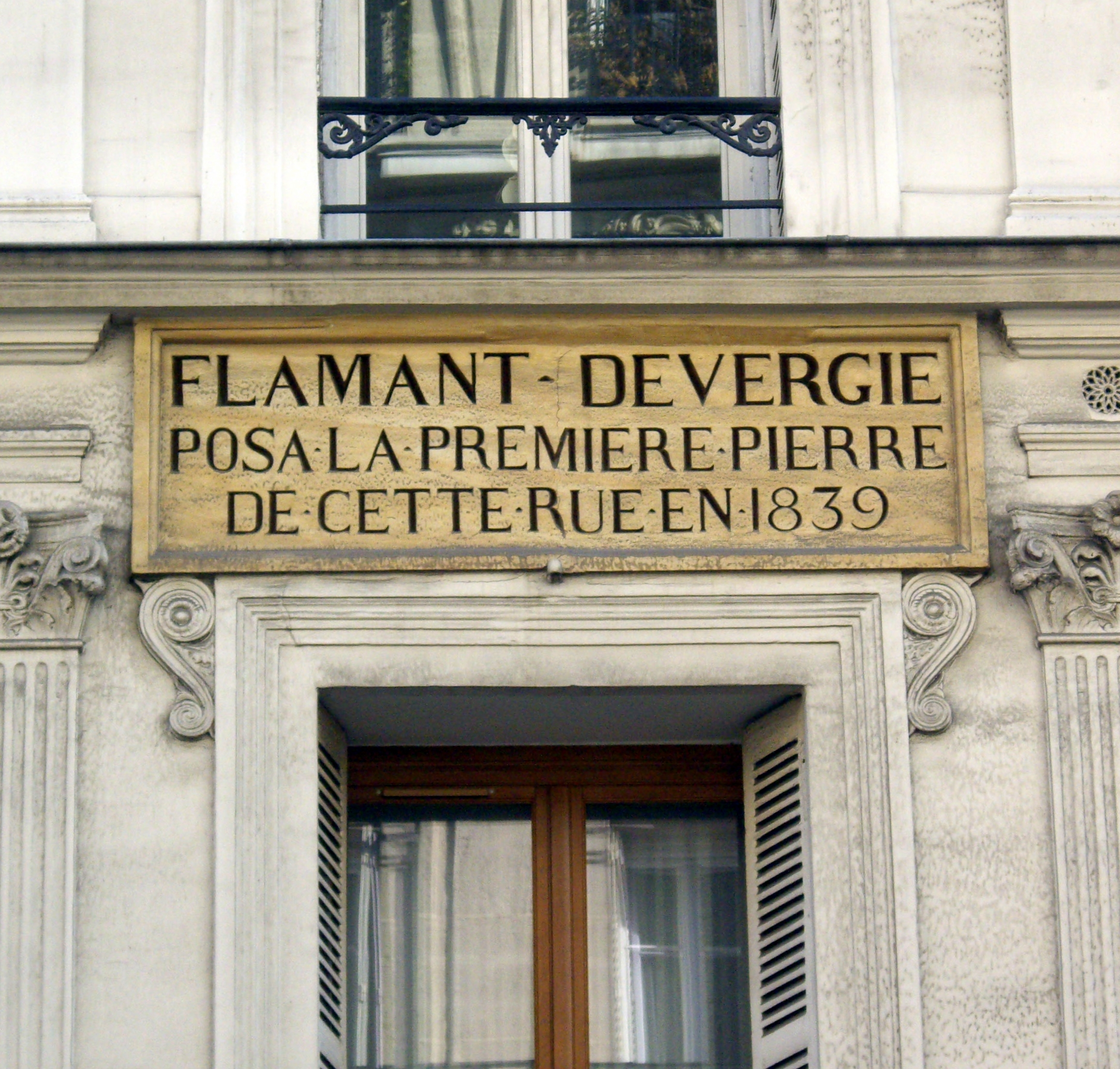
Plaque affixed to no. 19-21 rue Rambuteau

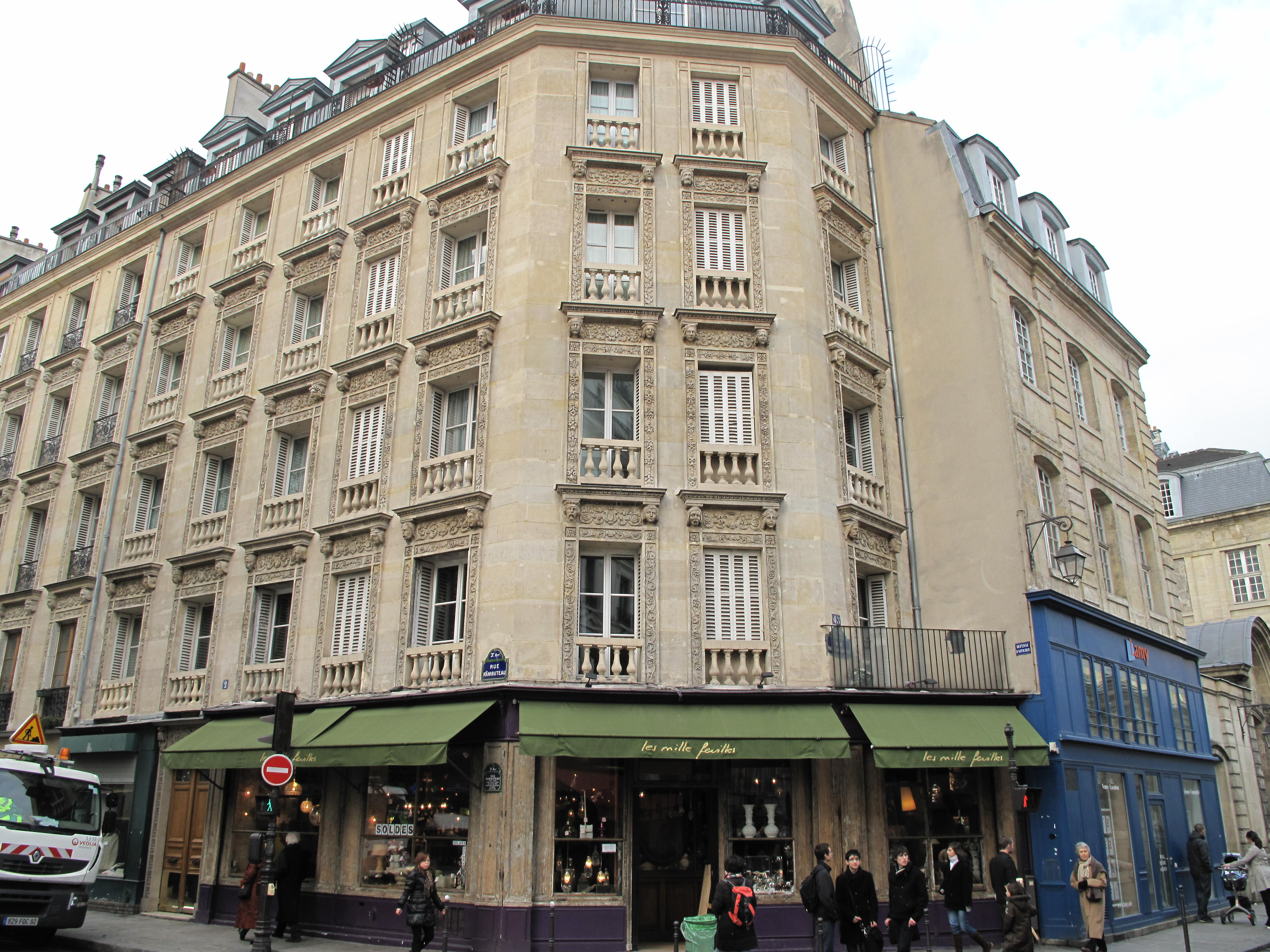
Corner of the Rue Rambuteau and the Rue des Archives
