= Council of the Navy (Polysynody) =

French government council (1715–1718)

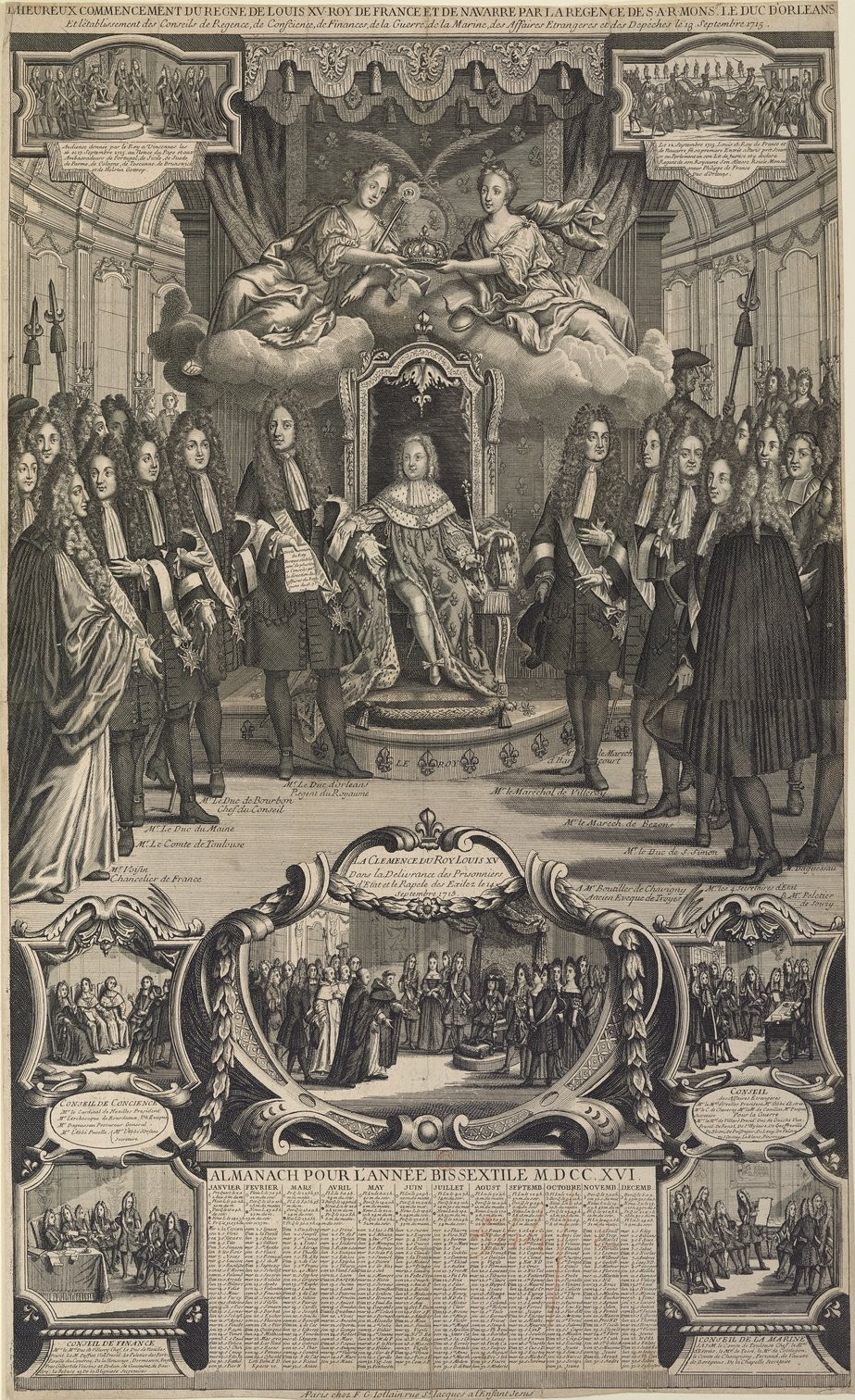
The auspicious beginning of the reign of Louis XV, King of France and Navarre, through the regency of His Royal Highness Monsieur the Duke of Orleans and the establishment of the Councils.

The Council of the Navy was a special council within the polysynody, system of government established by Regent Philippe d'Orléans during the Regency from 1715 to 1718. The polysynody allowed the high nobility to participate in political decisions by serving on seven councils that assisted the Regency Council.

The Council of the Navy, like the other councils of the polysynody, was established by the Regent through the declaration of September 15, 1715, replacing the Secretary of State for the Navy. Led by the Count of Toulouse and presided over by Marshal d'Estrées, the council comprised ten members from the nobility of the sword and the nobility of the robe, selected to maintain political equilibrium and expertise. They were all specialists in maritime affairs.

The Council of the Navy convened at least twice a week in Paris, similar to the other councils of the polysynody. It maintained the structure and staff of the former Secretary of State for the Navy's offices, inheriting its duties while also sharing some responsibilities with other councils. The council resolved 90% of the cases it reviewed, often concerning financial matters within a tightly controlled budgetary framework. More complex issues were referred to the Regent for further consideration. Moreover, the council intervened in the management of galleys and colonies.

Compared to other councils of the polysynody, the Council of the Navy was not disbanded in 1718 but continued to operate until the majority of Louis XV in 1723.

== Council of the Navy composition ==
=== Members ===
==== From September 1715 ====
- Louis-Alexandre de Bourbon (1678–1737), Count of Toulouse, Admiral of France, head of the Council of the Navy;
- Victor-Marie d'Estrées (1660–1737), Vice-Admiral of the Ponant, Marshal of France, president of the Council of the Navy, and vice-president of the Trade Council;
- Claude François Bidal (1667–1743), Marquis of Asfeld, Director General of Fortifications, also a member of the War Council;
- René III de Froullay de Tessé (1648–1725), Marshal of France, and Lieutenant General of the Galleys, resigned from the Council of the Navy in 1717;
- Antoine Bochard de Champigny (1650–1720), naval officer;
- Alain Emmanuel de Coëtlogon (1646–1730), Vice-Admiral of the Levant;
- Jean-Louis Girardin de Vauvré (1647–1724), intendant of the Levant Navy;
- François d'Usson de Bonrepaus (1644–1719), former intendant of the naval forces;
- François Antoine Ferrand (1657–1731), intendant of Brittany, also a member of the Trade Council.

==== At the end of 1715 ====
- Bernard Renau d'Élissagaray (1652–1719), lieutenant general.

=== Political balances’ considerations ===
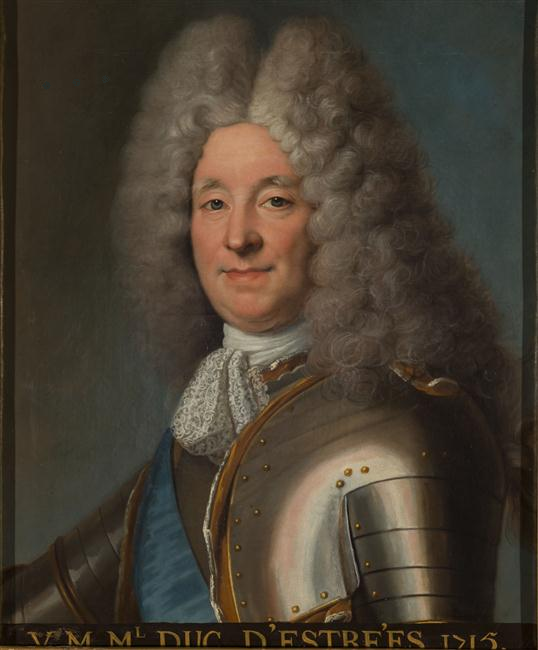
Victor-Marie d'Estrées

The War Council membership list was finalized on September 19, 1715. The Regent appointed members to various councils, taking into account political considerations in a precarious power situation. The aim was to rally the various components of the Court to his government. Therefore, appointing the Count of Toulouse as the head of the Council of the Navy was inevitable, given his position as the Admiral of France, and allows, as with his brother the Duke of Maine, to take into account his status: legitimatized bastard of Louis XIV, hence of an intermediate rank between the princes of the blood and the dukes and peers, at least until 1718. While not a staunch supporter of the Regent, unlike the Duke of Maine, the Count of Toulouse was not an avowed political adversary.

In the finance and conscience councils, the Regent appointed a member of the Noailles clan to lead the Council of the Navy, as a gesture of gratitude to these new political allies. Victor-Marie d'Estrées, the brother-in-law of the Duke of Noailles assumed the presidency of the Council of the Navy, forming a partnership with the Count of Toulouse that allows control over the latter. The Regent used this strategy in other councils, with Marshal d'Estrées also serving as vice-president of the Trade Council. Additionally, the Regent rewarded loyalists, such as the Marquis of Asfeld (whose appointment also allowed for the removal from office of Michel Le Peletier de Souzy, influential adviser to Louis XIV, as director of fortifications), who, as the new Director General of Fortifications, gained a seat on both the War Council and the Council of the Navy.

=== Gathering specialists ===
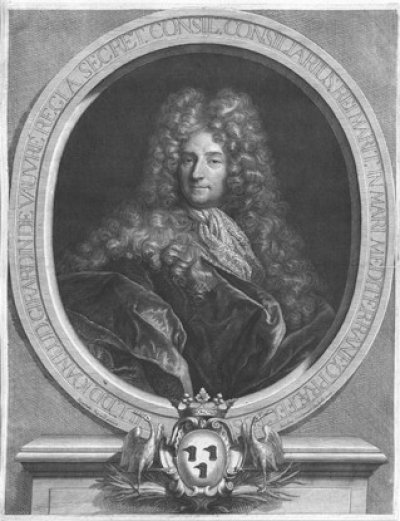
Jean-Louis Girardin de Vauvré, 1703

Like other councils, the composition of the Council of the Navy clearly demonstrated the primacy of expertise. It brought together the Admiral of France and the two Vice-Admirals (who lead military operations), making it a council of specialists. Many members had experience leading campaigns at sea: the Count of Toulouse, Marshal d'Estrées, Marshal de Tessé, Alain Emmanuel de Coëtlogon, and Antoine Bochard de Champigny, who commanded in the Mediterranean during the War of the Spanish Succession. Some of them, for example, also participated in the significant naval battle of Málaga.

They were accompanied by other specialists, administrative officers who have held prominent administrative positions in the navy: Jean-Louis Girardin de Vauvré, General Intendant of the Levant Marine; François d'Usson de Bonrepaus, former Intendant of Naval Armies and diplomat; and François Antoine Ferrand, Intendant of Brittany, well-versed in maritime affairs.

The Council of the Navy was not exclusively composed of nobles of the sword; three of its members were nobles of the robe. However, it is one of the councils within the polysynodie where the number of nobles of the sword is highest. Overall, the two nobilities were equally represented across all councils. This distribution was reasonable as the Council of the Navy oversees a corps of naval officers, where the number of nobles of the sword was increasing.

== The Council of the Navy at work ==
=== In Paris ===
Like the other councils of the polysynody, the Council of the Navy was based in Paris. In September 1715, the Regent orchestrated the move of the king and the court to Vincennes and then, swiftly to Paris, which thus became the political capital of France again. The young king Louis XV and his court settled at the Palais des Tuileries. The Council of the Navy, like most councils, convened at the Louvre, specifically in the former apartments of Anne of Austria, twice a week, on Tuesday and Friday, and sometimes held additional weekly sessions. It also occasionally met at the private mansion of the Count of Toulouse. The inaugural meeting of the council took place on September 28, 1715, with its operational guidelines likely established beforehand. However, François Antoine Ferrand arrived in Paris later, as he was still in Brittany at the end of January 1716, awaiting for his replacement. In a society where rank and precedence were structural, the Council of the Navy encountered a dispute over precedence, albeit less severe than in other councils, between Girardin de Vauvré and Usson de Bonrepaus.

The Council of the Navy was a true collegiate ministry, that operated without distributing responsibilities among its members. There was limited information about the conduct of the sessions, which seemed to have been prepared by Marshal d'Estrées. The excerpts of affairs that have been preserved showed the offices’ work, drafting a written summary with space provided for remarks and decisions, signed by the Count of Toulouse or Marshal d'Estrées. La Vrillière oversaw the Council of the Navy's work and retained his position as Secretary of State for Protestant Affairs during the establishment of the polysynodie because he was considered harmless.

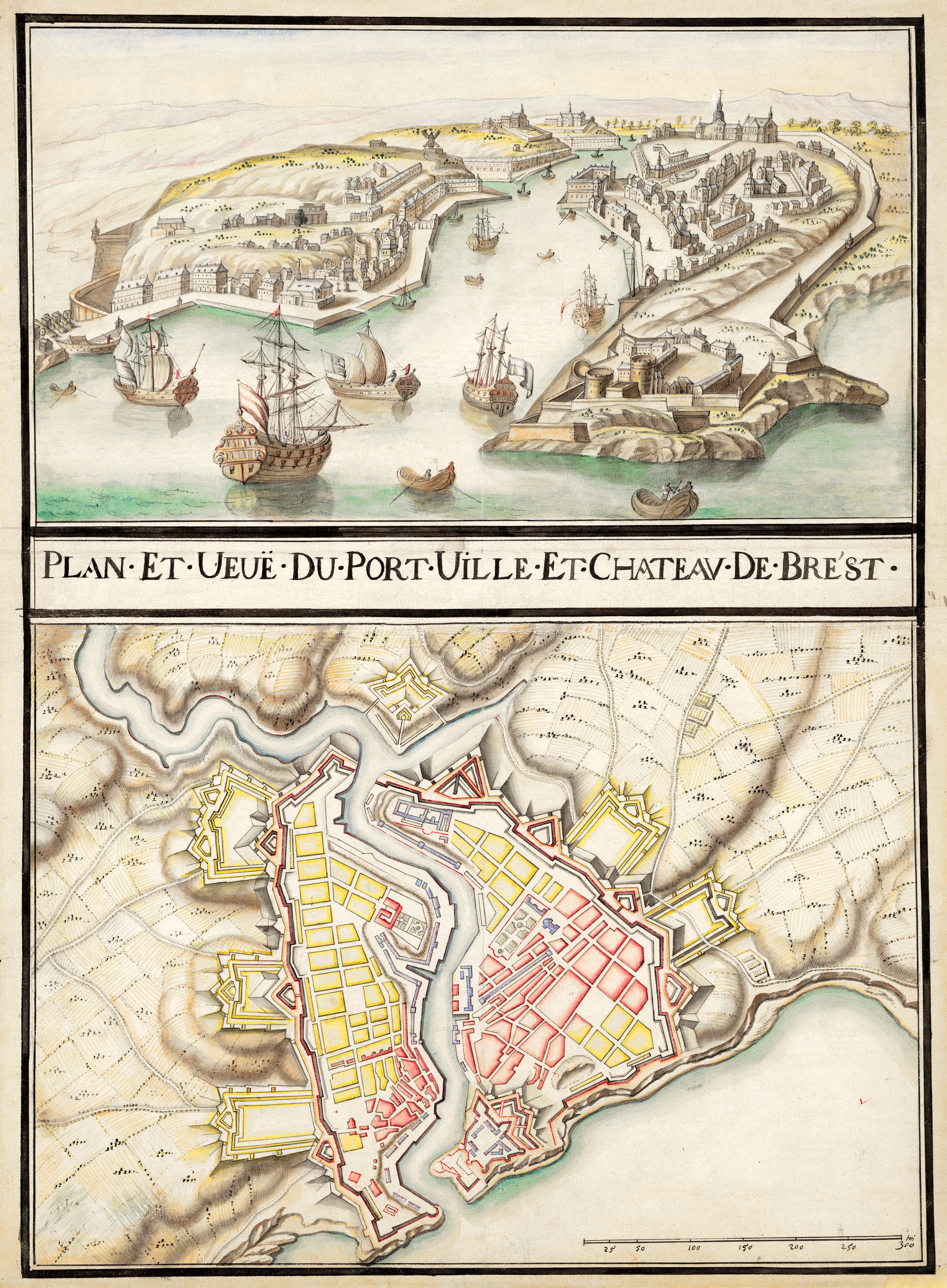
Brest around 1700, main arsenal of the Ponant fleet

The offices of the Council of the Navy were organized in continuation of those of the former Secretary of State for the Navy. They were arranged based on both geographical and thematic considerations and were staffed by thirty-five clerks who worked in a rented house on Rue des Fossés-Montmartre in Paris. These offices were situated there until 1722, before moving to Rue Coquillière where they remained until 1723, when the Court and the government returned to Versailles.

Each office was led by a chief clerk. Pierre de Batilly headed the Ponant office, Casimir Lefebvre de Givry lead the Levant office, and Pierre-Joseph Argoud headed the Funds office. The chief clerk of the Funds office played a crucial role as the head of personnel for the navy, overseeing various matters. Argoud held the highest salary among the chief clerks. Ambroise d'Aubenton de Villebois headed the consulates office; Antoine Denis Raudot headed the colonies office, as well as the classes of sailors, the Invalides, and the fortification; while Pierre Clairambault was the chief clerk of the archives office. Nicolas Clairambault managed the office responsible for reviewing the accounts of the navy treasurers and galleys. The secretariat was responsible for distributing the correspondence among the different offices for processing. These chief clerks were already in place before the creation of the polysynodie or succeeded their predecessors in a normal manner.

=== Skills and management of current affairs ===
The Council of the Navy inherited the former competencies of the Secretaries of State for the Navy, including the management of ports, the navy, galleys, the Navy Invalides, colonies, and consulates. It had control over its expenses, which were independent of the Council of Finances. The council collaborated with other councils on certain matters. For instance, it maintained correspondence with consuls, representatives of the king, protectors of French interests, and informants on foreign fleets. However, when the issues became political, they were transferred to the matter to the Council of Foreign Affairs, whose authority seemed to be considered superior. The Council of the Navy also shared responsibility for foreign trade with the Council of Commerce. For effective communication and coordination, members like François Antoine Ferrand and the Marquis d'Asfeld sat on War Council and Council of the Navy to address relevant matters that overlapped between them.

In theory, the Council of the Navy was one of the special councils of the polysynodie, responsible for transmitting important files to the Regency Council. However, in practice, the Council of the Navy handled 90% of the files independently, with only 2% being forwarded to the Regency Council. The remaining files were directly reviewed by the Regent himself, bypassing the Regency Council. The files forwarded by the Council of the Navy were typically the most sensitive ones: judicial affairs, disputes with foreign powers, or the 1717 rebellion in Martinique, which posed a significant a challenge to the Exclusif regime.

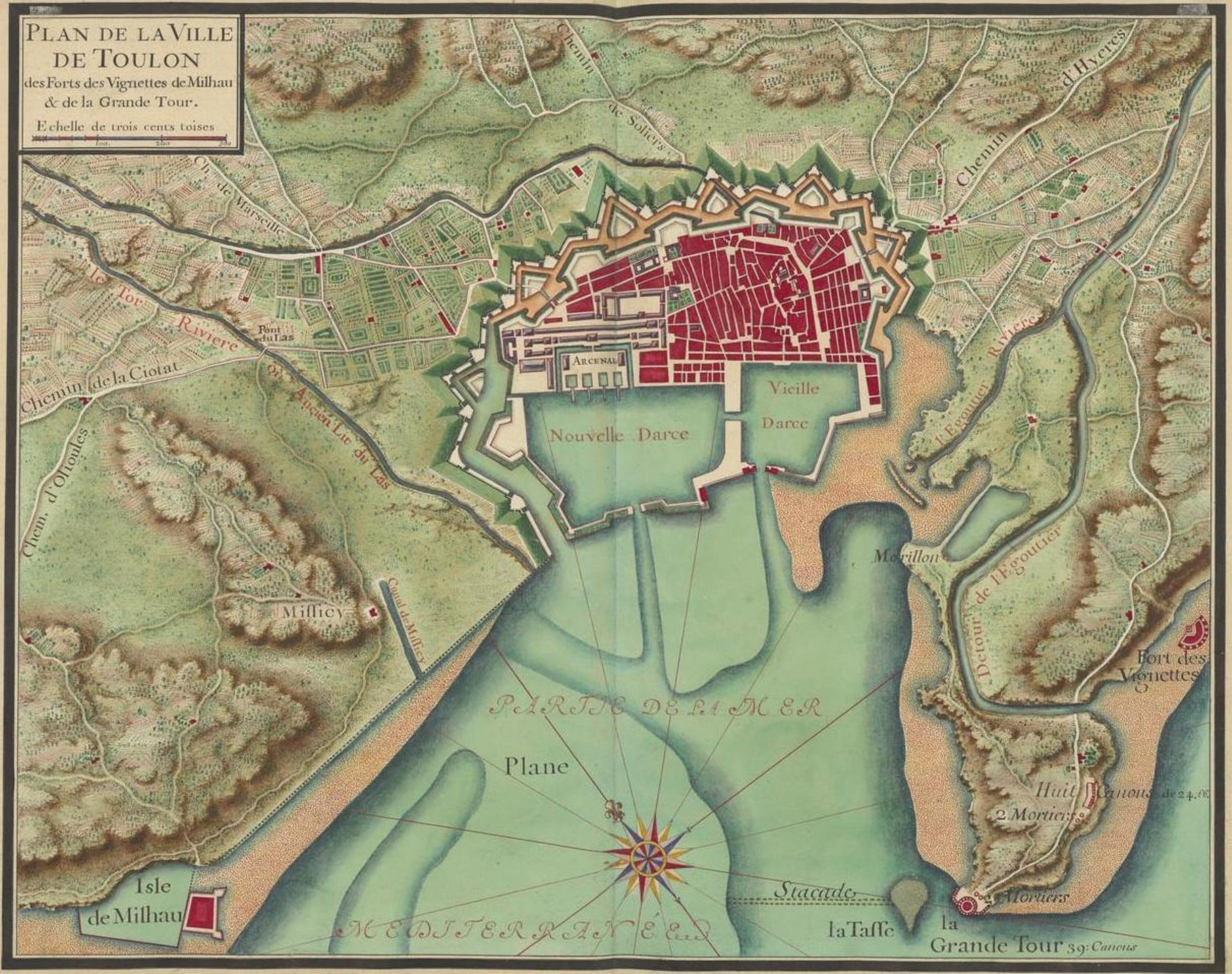
The port of Toulon, the Levant fleet, its two docks and arsenal circa 1700

The Council of the Navy relied on an organized administration and counterparts, primarily corresponding with the naval intendants (to whom it generally responds within two weeks), naval commissioners, governors of colonies, and consuls. It inherited a structured naval and administrative tool developed during the reign of Louis XIV, with most members of the Council having been involved in this effort. The affairs handled by the Council of the Navy primarily concerned the Ponant, accounting for a quarter of them. Funds, or expenses, represented approximately 18% of the affairs, while the colonies and the Levant each accounted for about 15% of the affairs. However, in reality, the bulk cases for both the Ponant and the Levant involved necessary expenses for ports, ship maintenance, and troops. Matters related to foreign countries made up 10% of the total, while fortifications and invalids each represent approximately 7%. Issues concerning the classes of sailors and coast guards were very few in number.

=== The fleet, the galleys, the colonies, and the consuls ===
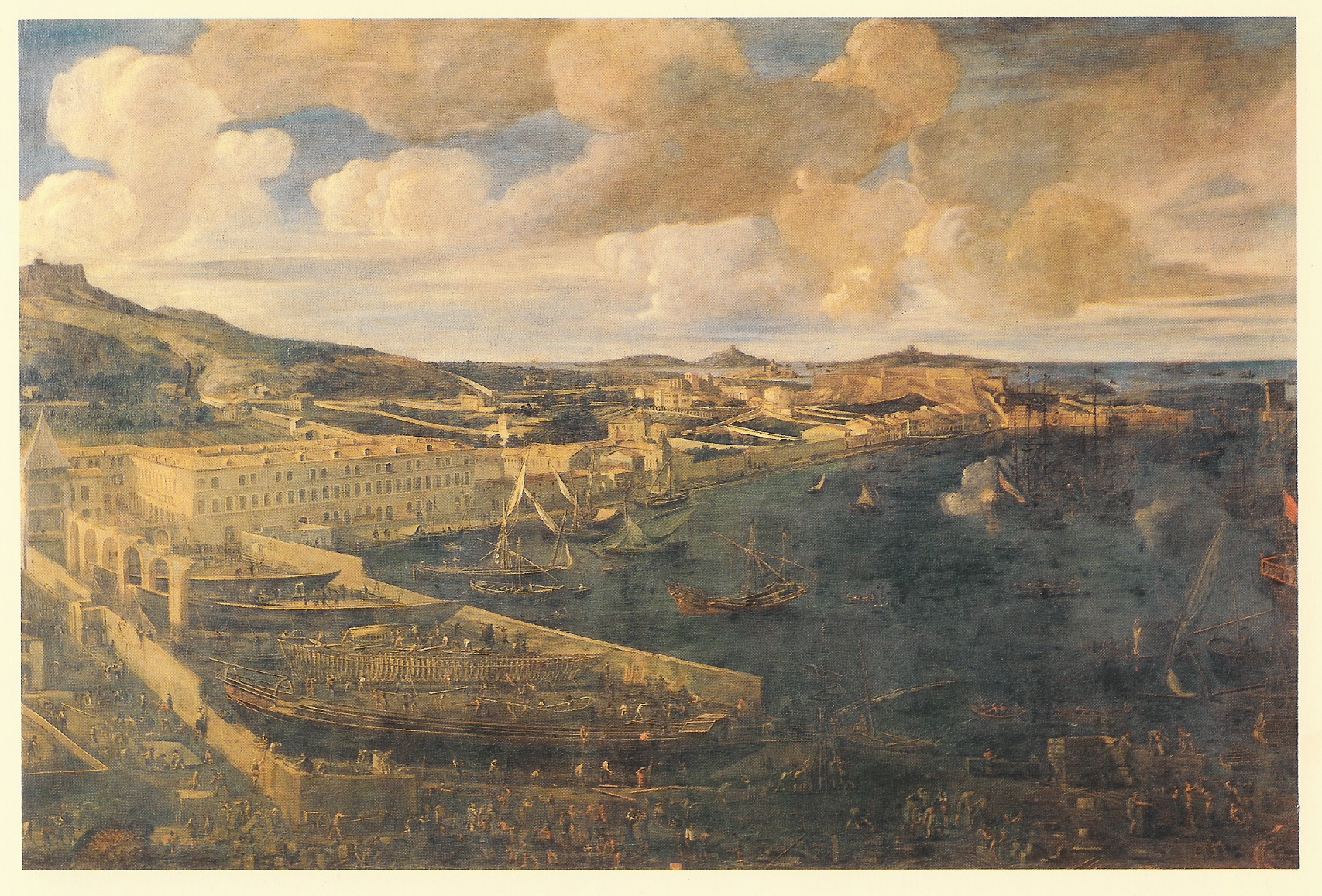
Arsenal des Galères de la ville de Marseille, Jean-Baptiste de La Rose, 1666, Musée de la Marine of the Chamber of Commerce and Industry Aix Marseille Provence.

The Council of the Navy reorganized some of the administrations under its jurisdiction, such as the coast guard and the maritime provostship. In 1716, it established the company of the eighty guards, the honor guard of the Admiral of France, stationed in Brest and Toulon. However, due to budgetary constraints, the construction of the fleet was not resumed. On the contrary, it sought to reduce costs, including the number of sailors and clerical officers.

In the Levant, the management of galleys included overseeing convicts in Marseille. As early as October 1715, the Council of the Navy took steps to address the issue by requesting lists of released convicts from the general intendant of the galleys, Pierre Arnoul. Convicts sentenced to the galleys sometimes were not released at the end of their terms, leading to complaints. This intervention improved the adherence to sentence durations and increased the survival rate of galley slaves, particularly those with shorter sentences.

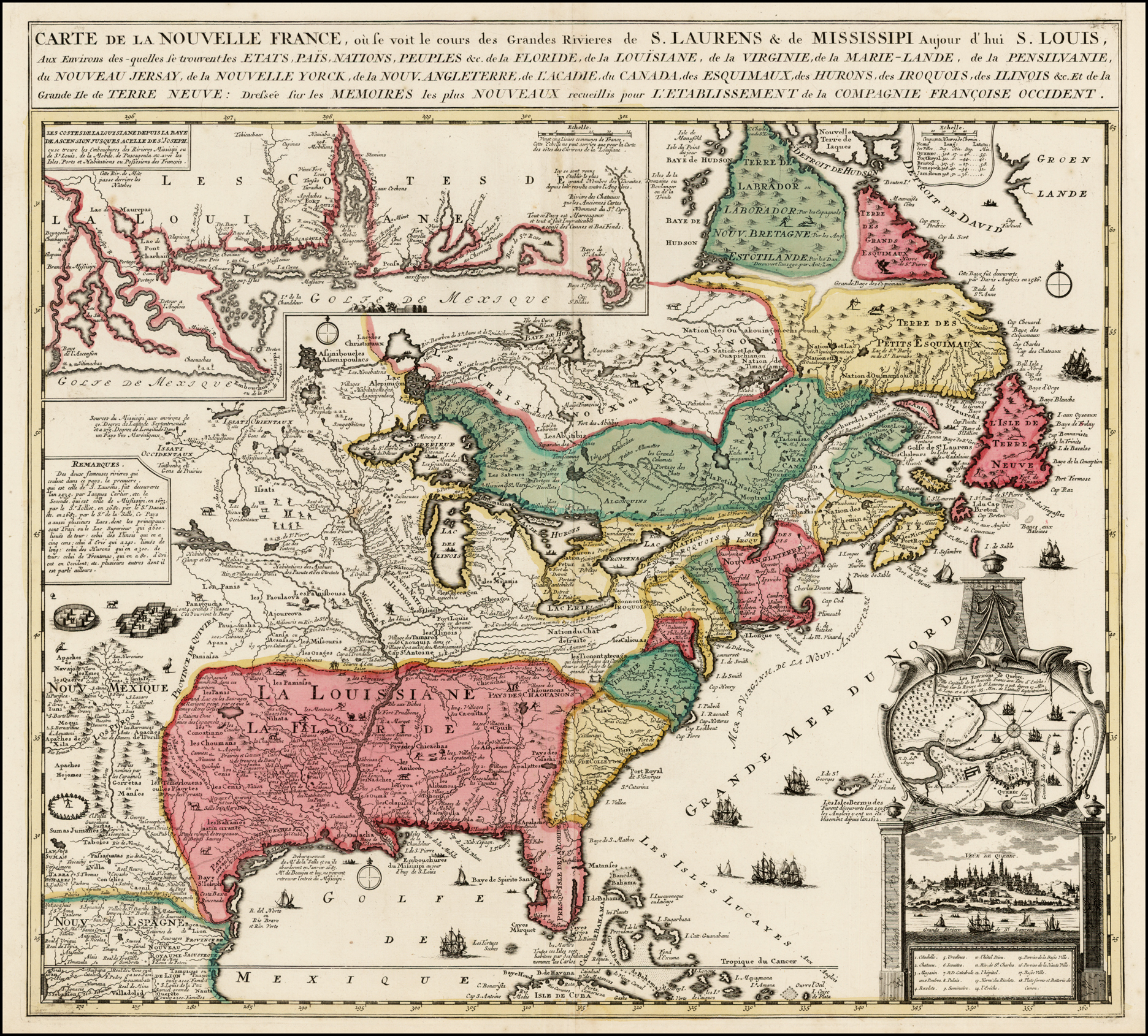
Map of New France, Nicolas de Fer, 1719

The Council of the Navy reviewed reports from governors and lieutenant generals of the king in the colonies, and missionaries responsible for evangelization, such as in Canada. It established admiralties in the French colonies of America. The edict of January 12, 1717, specifically created admiralty seated in Quebec, Louisbourg, and Saint-Pierre in Martinique. These were first-instance courts that adjudicated maritime disputes. The Council of the Navy laid a role in decisions made by the Regent to entrust Louisiana to the new Mississippi Company and promoted its settlement by sending vagabonds gathered in Rochefort, leading to the founding of New Orleans. Additionally, the Council of the Navy authorized free trade with Guinea, encouraging the triangular trade.

The Council of the Navy also handled consulate matters, including commercial disputes between the French and local authorities of foreign countries, in various regions such as Northern Europe, Spain, Portugal, Italy, in the Levant, etc. To streamline communication, The Council of the Navy requested consuls to follow specific letter formats for increased efficiency. Some consuls like Jean-Baptiste-Gaston de Faucon de Ris, Count of Charleval, the consul in Naples, felt overwhelmed by the demands of the Council of the Navy and expressed their complaints. The Council of the Navy should have dealt with the discontent of foreign sovereigns by temporizing when they demand the recall of the consul, as Victor Amadeus II of Savoy requests in 1716 for the French consul in Nice, Lucien Barbet de Longpré.

== The Council of the Navy after the Polysynody (1718-1723) ==
On September 24, 1718, the Regent put an end to the Polysynody, which had been facing growingly criticism and dysfunction. The Council of War was dissolved through a simple letter from the Regent to its president, along with the councils of conscience, foreign affairs, and domestic affairs. However, the Council of the Navy was retained. Initially, the Regent had considered abolishing as well, but eventually decided against it.

The maintenance of the Council of the Navy could be attributed to the Regent's favoritism towards the Count of Toulouse, whom he spared, unlike his brother, the Duke of Maine, when both legitimized bastards lost their status in 1718. The Count of Toulouse reciprocated by not opposing the Regent. Moreover, the Council of the Navy operated effectively, with its activity continuing even after the end of the Polysynody in 1718. It remained the most active council in terms of reported cases, and its work regarded as diligent.

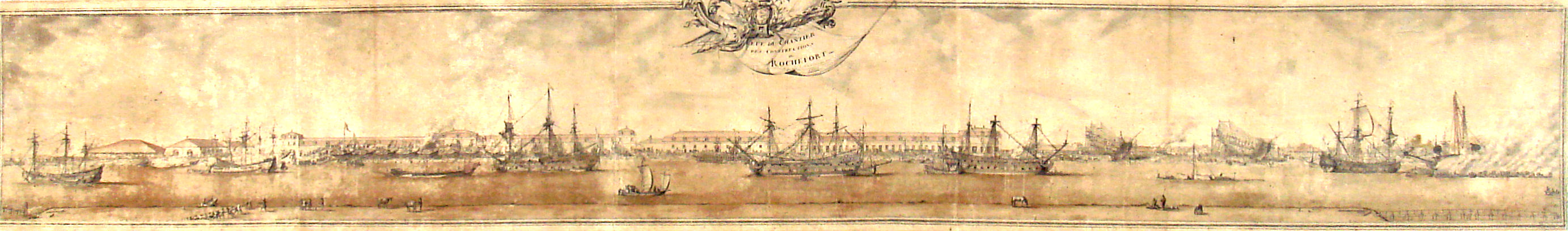
Rochefort arsenal in 1690.

The Council of the Navy continued its work and investigated numerous cases in the years after the Polysynody's disappearance. In 1719, it sought to establish a consistent commercial bridge between Canada and the port of Rochefort. The goal was to supply the latter with construction wood by sending a ship to Quebec each year to transport the necessary materials back to the Rochefort arsenal.

The Council of the Navy was abolished in 1723, during the king's majority. On March 23, 1723, Prime Minister Cardinal Dubois informed the intendants:

"The Naval Council having ceased due to the king's majority. His Majesty has entrusted this department to Mr. Count de Morville, Secretary of State, and He has ordered me to write to you that He wishes you to report to him in the future on the details of the service with which you are entrusted."

A new Council of the Navy would be established under the First Empire by Imperial Decree of July 22, 1806. Its purpose was to examine the performance of senior officers and sea commanders.

== See also ==
=== Bibliography ===
- Antoine, Michel (1970). Le Conseil du Roi sous le règne de Louis XV, Paris-Genève (in French). Vol. 19. Droz, Mémoires et documents publiés par la société de l'Ecole des Chartes.
- Dessert, Daniel (1996). La Royale. Vaisseaux et marins du Roi-Soleil (in French). Paris: Fayard. ISBN 2-213-02348-4.
- Dupilet, Alexandre (2011). La Régence absolue. Philippe d'Orléans et la polysynodie (1715-1718). Époques (in French). Seyssel: Champ Vallon. ISBN 978-2-87673-547-7.
- Lemarchand, Laurent (2014). Paris ou Versailles ? La monarchie absolue entre deux capitales (1715-1723). Histoire (in French). Vol. 53. Paris: CTHS. ISBN 978-2-7355-0797-9.

=== Related articles ===
- History of the French Navy
- List of naval ministers of France
- Régence
- Polysynody
- Navy Board
