= Polysynody =

Short-lived council based system in France (1715–1718)

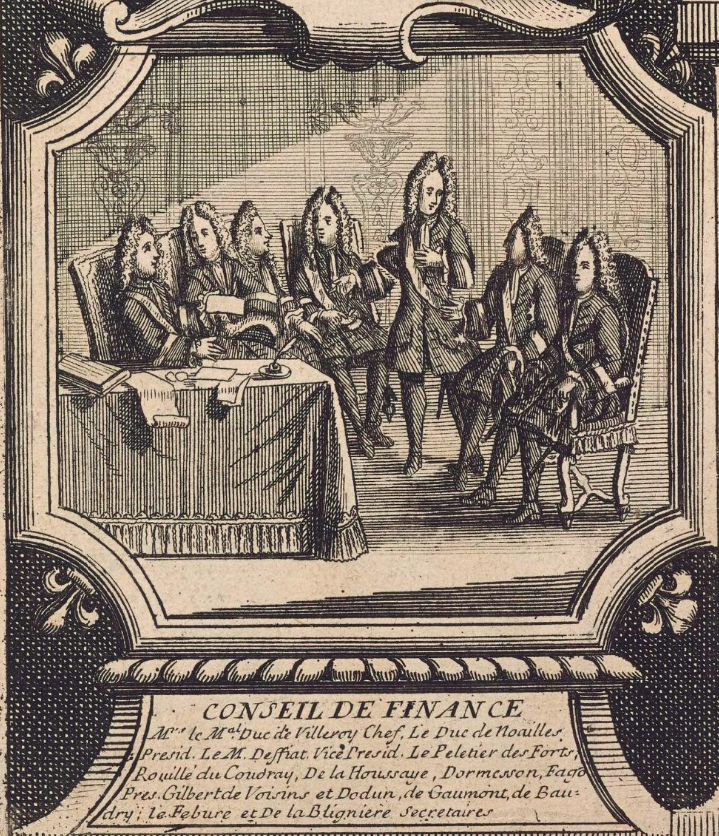
Young Louis XV and d'Orléans creating councils of the Polysynody

Polysynody (from Greek πολυς numerous, several, and Greek συνοδος meeting, assembly) was an experimental system of government in use in Early Modern France between 1715 and 1718 and in which each minister (secretary of state) was replaced by a council. It was introduced early into the Regency of Philippe d'Orléans following the death of Louis XIV.

The Polysynody was inspired by enlightenment ideals, however the system saw mixed successes but historians generally agree that the Polysynody didn't effectively alter either daily life nor the political culture of the Ancien régime. Throughout the Polysynody, its councils enabled notable events such as the economic experiments of John Law and the reforms of the Navy.

While generally presented as an attempt to reestablish the political strength of the second estate, historians which examine this short period conclude that d'Orléans didn't allow the system much strength so it wouldn't undermine his authority and power as regent.

== Background ==
=== Succession of Louis XIV ===
Over his reign, Louis XIV through his Absolutist conception of the state had positioned the monarch as the sovereign and significantly increased state centralisation and disempowering the Parlements and the second estate. Nearing his death in 1714-1715, the majority of family who were eligible for Kinghood had died or were illegitimate, leaving only his grandson the Duke of Anjou as an acceptable Dauphin of France despite his age. To govern France until his heir reached maturity, Louis XIV had no other choice than to appoint a Regent, with the two choices for the position being his nephew, Philippe II, Duke of Orléans or the contemporary king of Spain, Philip V, whom had only ascended to the country's throne by renouncing his claim to the French's. His rhetorical claim had already risked another European war, let alone the possibility of him being the only legitimate heir if young Duke of Anjou were to die.

=== D'Orléans coup ===
Louis XIV tried to precede this by limiting the future regent to only being the head of a council of peers that would be the ones to actually decide on matters of state or the king. d'Orléans circumvented this by promising to relax the state over the Unigenitus bull to Jansenist and Gallican parlimentaires and offering both the restoration the Parliaments right to remonsterance (which were removed in 1673) adding that they did not have to consult the king beforehand, which greatly bolstered the power of the Parliaments. The adult Louis XV would later condemned this act as having lead to his stand off's with parlements to the regent's grandson, Louis Philippe.

=== Intellectual origins of the Polysnody ===
An aristocratic ideal of government emerged around the personalities of Fénelon (the famous archbishop of Cambrai and tutor of the Duke of Burgundy, grandson of Louis XIV and heir to the throne), the duc de Beauvilliers (governor of the duke of Burgundy), the duc de Chevreuse (son-in-law of Colbert), and the duc de Saint-Simon who particularly urged d'Orléans to replace the Louis XIV's minister lead government with a system of councils., d'Orléans himself had commissioned two of his family members to study conciliar governments in French history and hated the king's politics and bureaucracy of Louis XIV

Fénelon wrote that "[...]the supreme and perfect government consists in governing those who govern,[...]" in his magnum opus book, Les Aventures de Telemaque, which was considered essential reading for France's political elite. The book was composed of enlightnment sentiment endoring a vision of the King as a somewhat God-like figure in their guiding of society.

== Polsynody ==
=== Councils ===
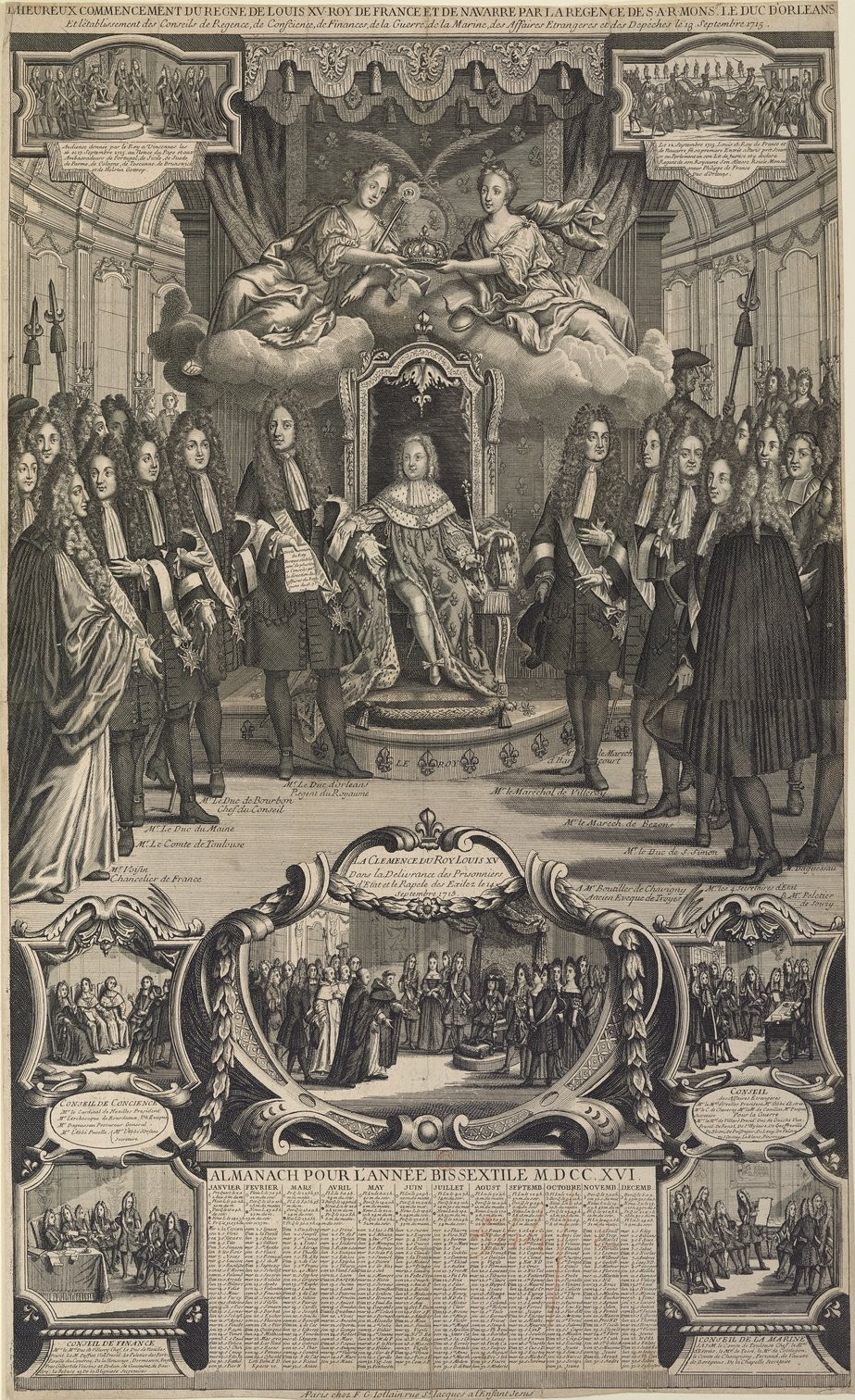
The various councils of the Polysynody

The regent began replacing the ministers and secretaries of state which were dominated by the ancient aristocracy with eight councils with the declarations of September 15 and December 14, 1715. The Council of the Regency, chaired by the regent, had no real power. The other councils shared government power. They were:

- Council of Matters within the Kingdom (Conseil des affaires du dedans du royaume),
- Council of Conscience (Conseil de conscience) for religious matters
- Council of War (Conseil de guerre),
- Council of the Navy (Conseil de marine)
- Council of Finance (Conseil de finance)
- Council of Foreign Affairs (Conseil des affaires étrangères)
- Council of Commerce (Conseil de commerce) for internal and foreign trade as well as for royal factories (manufactures).

Each council had ten members and elected one president.

=== Notable Members ===
d'Orléans would appoint Jansenist prelate Louis Antoine de Noailles to serve as president of the Council of Conscience in spite of Louis XIV prior legal persecution of the sect.

== Results and dissolution ==
Although the regent Philippe d'Orléans was cautious enough to admit all the ministers of the last government of Louis XIV (except for Nicolas Desmarets, controller-general, i.e. minister of finance, dismissed by the regent), as well as many of the high officers and civil servants of Louis XIV, to sit in the councils alongside the aristocrats, this system of government worked poorly due to the absenteeism and ineptitude of the aristocrats, as well as to conflicts of personalities.

From the creation of these councils, many careered statesmen of Louis XIV were now equal to inexperienced nobles. The Polysynody also failed to permit powersharing in the provinces where the intendants under Louis XIV went about business unimpeded much to the disappointment of various parties

d'Orléans own actions also served to weaken the executive power of the councils, made clear an atmosphere whereby any actions which could threaten or weaken the centralism of the state would not be permitted. The councils main effect in essence was just allowing more room for those appointed in government positions to engage in their own agendas rather than allowing any sections of the government to democratically decide on their own objectives.

=== Jansenism ===
Though d'Orléans appointed Jansenists to power, this didn't amount to new political or religious power for the sect as d'Orléans was apathetic to both them and their persecution, and did not assist the Jansenists with their fight against the Pope despite their hopes.

=== Dissolution ===
As a result, between 1718 and 1723 the regent gradually abolished the councils despite the passionate defense of the abbot de Saint-Pierre (Discours sur la polysynodie, 1718), and he reestablished the offices of minister and secretary of state, reverting to the "ministerial despotism" of Louis XIV.

== Historical Appraisal ==
=== Dynastic pragmatism ===
Colin Jones proposes that the Polysynody was fundamentally limited in nature regardless of d'Orléans or any in the government or civil societies wish for it, given the regency itself was an inherently limited affair and that if the often sick Louis XV were die young (an ever present possibility), meaning d'Orléans would assume the throne. in this scenario, it's better for d'Orléans to keep his options open to assume an absolutist rule akin to Louis XIV instead of foreclosing himself to the option if the Polysynody were to become entrenched and more radical.

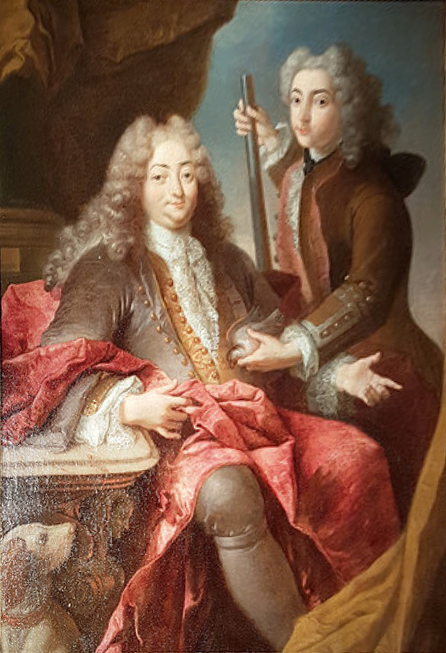
A painting of d'Orleans with Louis XV

=== Threats to centralism and geopolitics ===
Several historians such as James Hardy Jr and Harold A. Ellis and Jean Meyer believe that the d'Orléans was deeply concerned about the Polysynody's empowerment of officials during his legitimacy conflict and wars with Phillip V could allow those with unfirm loyalties greater capacity to subvert the Sovereign's more contensious political descions. Jones goes further that Polysynody was existed as a whole to sure up goodwill among the nobility and buy time for his rule to become more entrenched which by 1718 had been made thorough and now the diversion risked becoming real and used to attack him, namely on foreign policy. French historian Jean Meyer particularly notes the Polysynody's foreign minister, Nicolas Chalon du Blé who was a supporter of Phillip V. (Note: "Jean Meyer has suggested another though not incompatible reason for the suppression of the Polysynody in 1718: the vieille cour attachments of many of its members, a possible source of trouble for the Regent now engaged in isolating Spain and aligning France with Louis XIV's former enemies (Le Regent, 160-67). It will be noted that Philip V had a firm supporter in the Polysynody's foreign minister, Nicolas du Ble, marquis and marechal d'Huxelles.")

J. H. Shennan views that the Polysynody helped give legitimacy to the Regent by appealing Magistrates eager to regain power alongside balancing the extremes in politics without the possibility of him having to resort to the support of any particular faction.
