= Shennan =

Shennan may refer to:

People whose surname is Shennan:

- Bob Shennan (born 1962), British radio executive and BBC Radio 2 Controller (2009-present)
- J. H. Shennan (1933–2015), British historian
- Stephen Shennan (born 1949), British archaeologist

Places with the name:

- Mount Shennan, a mountain in East Antarctica
- Shennan Road, in Shenzhen, China
