= Régence =

1715–1723 period in France

La Régence
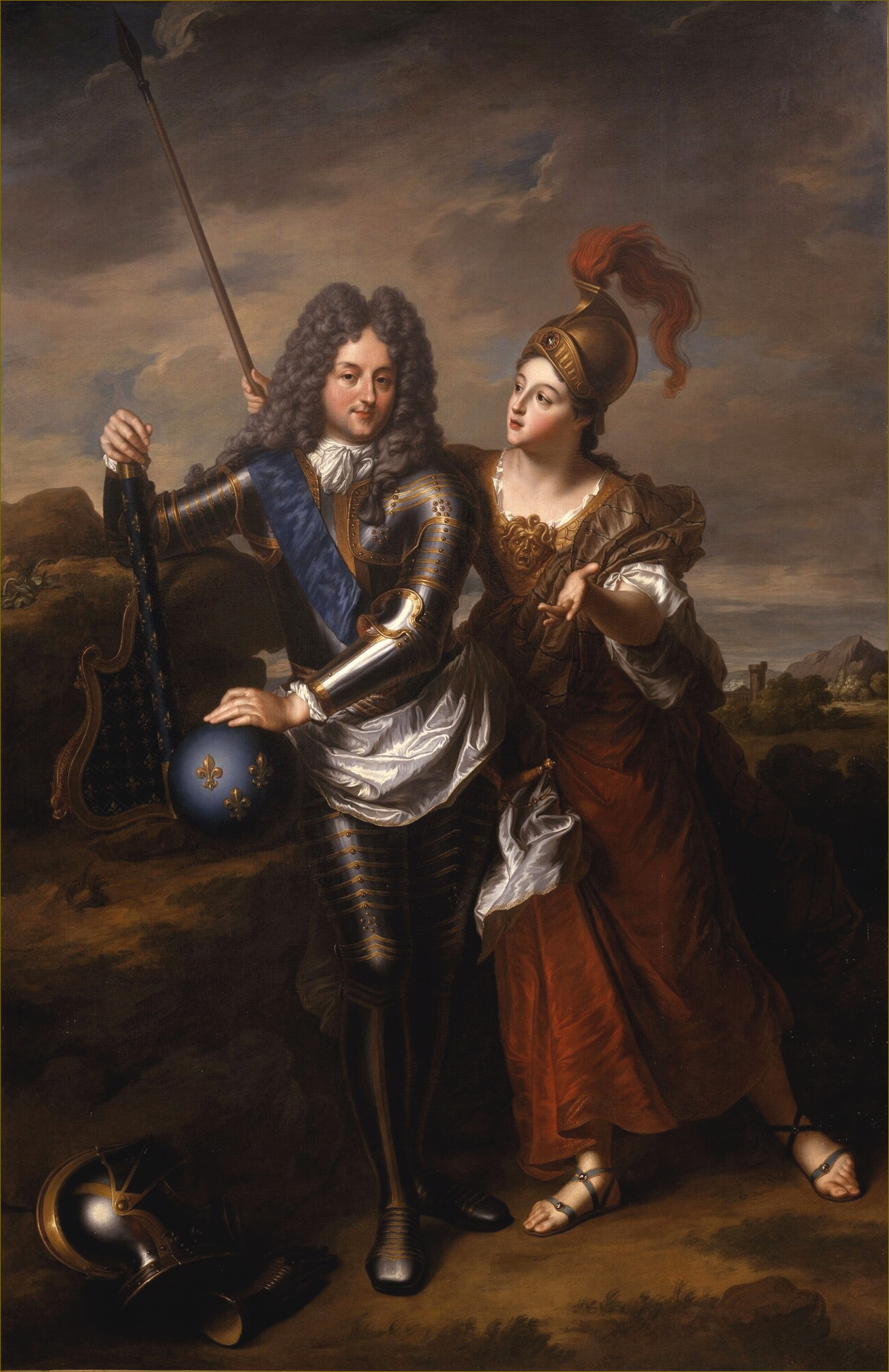
- Philippe with Marie-Madeleine de Parabère as Athena; Jean-Baptiste Santerre, 1716

Philippe d'Orléans, Duke of Orléans
- In office 1 September 1715 – 15 February 1723
- Monarch: Louis XV
- Prime Minister: Guillaume Dubois (in 1723)

The Régence (French pronunciation: [ʁeʒɑ̃s], Regency) was the period in French history between 1715 and 1723 when King Louis XV was considered a minor and the country was instead governed by Philippe II, Duke of Orléans (a nephew and son-in-law of Louis XIV) as prince regent. This was not the only regency in French history, but the name is nevertheless associated with this period.

Philippe was able to take power away from Louis-Auguste, Duke of Maine (illegitimate son of Louis XIV and Madame de Montespan) who had been the favourite son of the late king and possessed much influence. From 1715 to 1718 the Polysynody changed the system of government in France, in which each minister (secretary of state) was replaced by a council. The système de Law was also introduced, which transformed the finances of the bankrupted kingdom and its aristocracy. Both Cardinal Dubois and Cardinal Fleury were highly influential during this time.

Contemporary European rulers included Philip V of Spain, John V of Portugal, George I of Great Britain, Charles VI, Holy Roman Emperor, and Victor Amadeus II of Sardinia, the maternal grandfather of Louis XV.

== Chronology ==
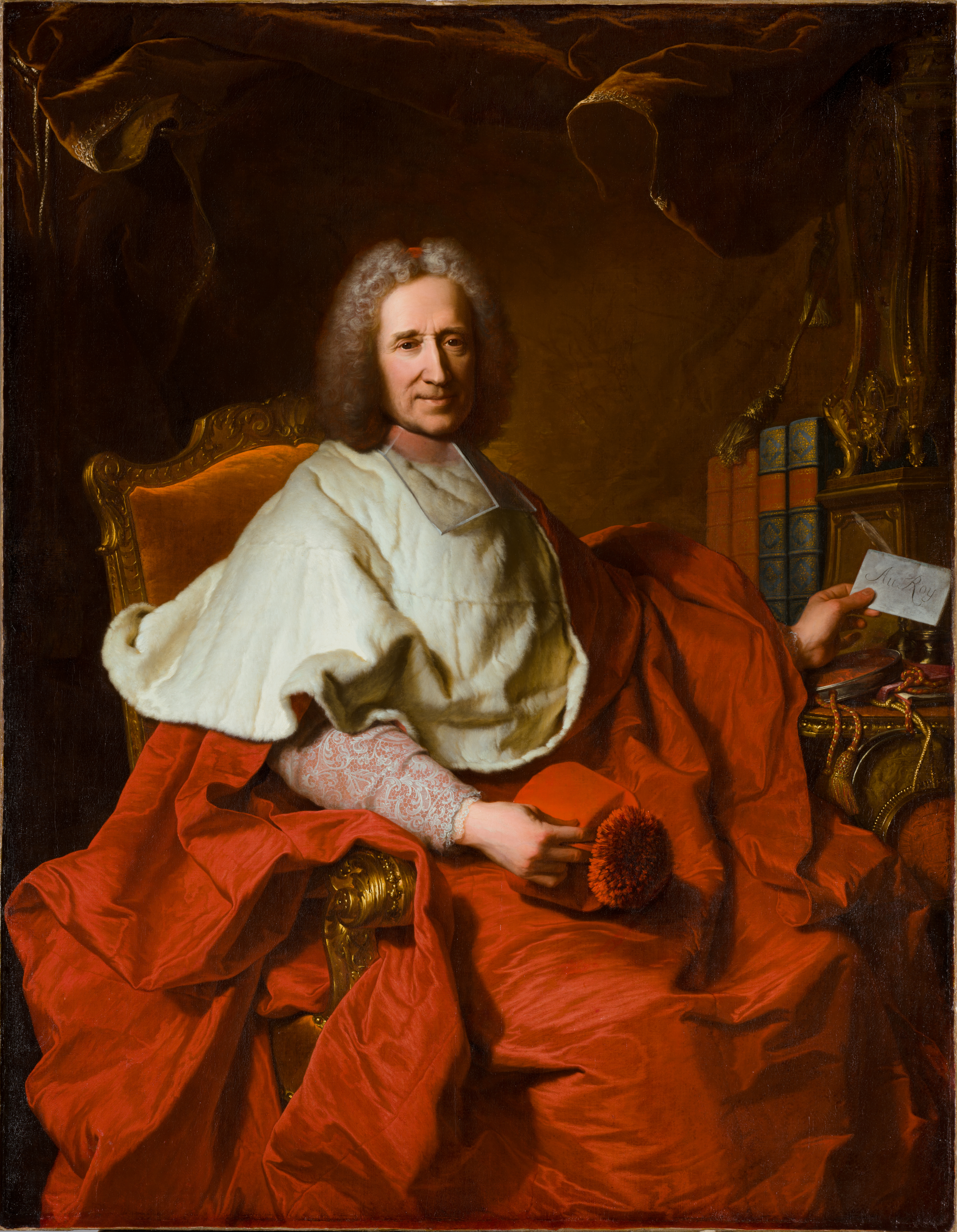
Portrait of Cardinal Dubois by Hyacinthe Rigaud, 1723. Dubois was Chief Minister during the Régence.

=== 1714 ===
- 29 July 1714: the Duke of Maine and the Count of Toulouse, Louis XIV's bastard sons, are made Princes of the Blood.

=== 1715 ===
- 1 September 1715: Louis XIV dies, his will entrusts the government of France to a regency council, with Philippe II, Duke of Orléans as an honorary president and the Duke of Maine as the real power, until his great-grandson and successor, the five-year old Louis XV, reaches his majority (13 years old) in 1723.
- 2 September 1715: the Duke of Orléans allies himself with the Parlement of Paris, who cancelled Louis XIV's will. As a Prince of the Blood, Philippe of Orléans had been a member of the Parlement.
- 9 September: Body of Louis XIV taken to the Basilica of Saint-Denis; Louis XV sets off for Château de Vincennes with the Regent, Madame de Ventadour, Villeroi, Toulouse and Maine; Philip V of Spain hears of his grandfather's death;
- 12 September: Philippe of Orléans recognised Regent by order of the Parlement;
- 15 September: Parlement claims the Droit de remontrance, the right to revoke a law made by a King who had died, further supporting the Regent's claim to power.
- 1 October 1715: Polysynody was held in Paris; it was composed of the highest nobility of the country.
- 30 December: Removal of Louis XV from the Château de Vincennes to the Tuileries Palace;
- Louis XV put under the care of François de Neufville, Duke of Villeroi; Guillaume Delisle and the Cardinal Fleury are put in charge of Louis' education.

=== 1716 ===
- 2 May: Philippe d'Orléans allows John Law to found the Banque générale;
- 27 June: Birth of Louise Diane d'Orléans at the Palais-Royal; she was the last child of the Regent;
- 9/10 October: Alliance with Great Britain;

=== 1717 ===
- Triple Alliance (1717); a treaty between the Dutch Republic, France and Great Britain, against Spain, attempting to maintain the agreement of the 1713 Treaty of Utrecht;
- 31 March: The Regent's second surviving daughter Louise Adélaïde takes the veil and becomes a nun under the name of Sœur Sainte-Bathilde.
- 21 May: Arrival of Tsar Peter the Great of Russia in Paris; he visits the King, Versailles, the Regent, his daughter Marie Louise Élisabeth d'Orléans; he stays in Paris; he does not see the Duchess of Orléans despite her pleas; Peter stays at the Grand Trianon;
- 6 June 1717: Purchase of the Regent Diamond; later part of the French Crown Jewels;
- July: the Duke of Maine and the Count of Toulouse are stripped of their rank of Princes of the Blood by the Parlement
- September: Foundation of the Compagnie d'Occident et du Mississippi;

=== 1718 ===
- March: Arrival of Leopold, Duke of Lorraine and his consort, Élisabeth Charlotte d'Orléans (sister of the Regent);
- 31 March: Infanta Mariana Victoria of Spain born in Madrid; later betrothed to Louis XV;
- 11 April: Death of the Dowager Duchess of Vendôme;
- 7 May: Death of Mary of Modena at the Château de Saint-Germain-en-Laye; she was Queen consort of the exiled James II of England;
- 2 August: Quadruple Alliance with Austria, France, the Dutch Republic and Great Britain – aimed at revising (principally at Spain's expense) the treaties which ended the War of the Spanish Succession;
- 24 September: end of the Polysynody and the reestablishment of ministers;
- 4 December: Banque générale becomes the Banque Royale;
- December Exposure of the Cellamare Conspiracy headed by the Duke of Maine and his wife Anne Louise Bénédicte de Bourbon, which aimed at placing Philip V of Spain as regent of France with the help of the Spanish Ambassador, the "príncipe de Cellamare"; the Duke and Duchess are exiled from court and return in 1720 to their home at the Château de Sceaux;

=== 1719 ===
- 9 January: Declaration of War with Spain;
- 15 April: Death of Madame de Maintenon at Saint-Cyr-l'École;
- May: Foundation of the French East India Company by John Law;
- 21 July: Death of Marie Louise Élisabeth d'Orléans; daughter of the Regent who participated in the hectic nightlife of his court, even during several pregnancies with different men. (Jules Michelet, "Histoire de France, vol.XV, La Régence", Equateurs, 2008).

=== 1720 ===
- 5 January: John Law made Controller-General of Finances;
- 11 February: Marriage of Charlotte Aglaé d'Orléans to the Hereditary Prince of Modena at the Tuileries Palace;
- March: Great Plague of Marseille;
- 21 March: Death of Marie Anne de Bourbon, wife of the Duke of Bourbon;
- 26 March: Execution of the leaders of the Pontcallec Conspiracy against the Regency.

=== 1721 ===
- Publication of the Persian Letters by Montesquieu; negotiations between the Regent and Peter I of Russia begin regarding the proposed marriage of the Regent's only legitimate son to a daughter of the Emperor, namely either the Grand Duchess Anna Petrovna or the future Elizabeth of Russia; plans fail and Louis d'Orléans marries in 1724;
- 6 January: Arrest of Louis Dominique Bourguignon;
- 27 March: Alliance of Spain and France;
- May : Visit of Mehmet Effendi, Ottoman ambassador;
- 18 July: Death of Antoine Watteau;
- 17 September: Death of the Grand Duchess of Tuscany; cousin of the Regent;
- 29 December : Birth of the future Madame de Pompadour;
- Marie Anne de Bourbon is put in charge of the Infanta's education in France;

=== 1722 ===
- Madame la Duchesse Douairière starts the construction of the Palais Bourbon in Paris to a design by the Italian architect Lorenzo Giardini, approved by Jules Hardouin-Mansart;
- 20 January: Marriage of Louise Élisabeth d'Orléans to the future Louis I of Spain;
- 10 March: Arrival of Infanta Mariana Victoria of Spain in Paris; daughter of Philip V of Spain and Elisabeth Farnese;
- 15 June: Louis XV and the court return to Versailles; the Regent takes the old apartments of his dead cousin, the late Louis, Grand Dauphin;
- 22 August: Guillaume Dubois made the Chief Minister of the Regent;
- 25 October: Coronation of Louis XV at Reims Cathedral;
- 8 December: Death of Elizabeth Charlotte, Madame Palatine (Madame), mother of the Regent;

=== 1723 ===
- Louis XV orders plans for the future Salon d'Hercule to begin;
- 2 February: Secret marriage of the Count of Toulouse and Marie Victoire de Noailles (already widowed daughter in law of Mme de Montespan) in Paris; their marriage was only announced after the death of the Regent;
- 16 February: Louis XV attains his majority upon turning 13 years old
- 23 February: Death of Anne Henriette of Bavaria, Dowager Princess of Condé;
- 10 August: Death of Dubois; role later took on by Louis Henri, Duke of Bourbon;
- 2 December: Death of the Regent at the Palace of Versailles;

== The Polysynody ==
There were seven parts of the Polysynody all of which had their own ministers for the Regency:

1. Council of Conscience (Conseil de Conscience)
  Members included Cardinal de Noailles, Armand Bazin de Bezons (Archbishop of Bordeaux), Henri François d'Aguesseau, René Pucelle, Cardinal Fleury.
2. Council of Foreign Affairs (Conseil des Affaires étrangères, headed by Nicolas Chalon du Blé)
3. Council of War (Conseil de la Guerre)
  Members included: Duke of Villars, Dominique-Claude Barberie de Saint-Contest, Prince of Conti, Duke of Maine, Louis Henri de La Tour d'Auvergne, Duke of Gramont, Claude le Blanc.
4. Council of the Navy (Conseil de la Marine, headed by the Count of Toulouse)
5. Council of Finances (Conseil des Finances, headed by the Duke of Noailles)
6. Council of the Affairs the Kingdom (Conseil des Affaires du Dedans du Royaume, headed by the Duke of Antin – half brother of the Duke of Maine and Count of Toulouse)
  Members included: marquis de Harlay, de Goissard, Marquis of Argenson,
7. Council of Commerce (Conseil du Commerce)

== General ==
=== People ===
The Men

- Philippe II, Duke of Orléans (2 August 1674 – 2 December 1723) born at his father's Château de Saint-Cloud, he was the Duke of Chartres from birth; his mother, whom he was very close to, was a German princess of the Palatinate named Elizabeth Charlotte. In 1692 he married his first cousin, Françoise-Marie de Bourbon – the youngest illegitimate daughter of Philippe's uncle Louis XIV and Madame de Montespan. He died at Versailles in the arms of his mistress;
- Louis Henri, Duke of Bourbon (18 August 1692 – 27 January 1740) son of Louis III, Prince of Condé and Louise-Françoise de Bourbon, he was thus the nephew of Philippe d'Orléans and was the Chief minister of France 1723–26; he was a great rival of the Regent and the House of Orléans in general;
- Louis-Auguste, Duke of Maine (31 March 1670 – 14 May 1736) favourite but illegitimate son of Louis XIV and Madame de Maintenon, he was despised by the Princes of the Blood due to his constant honours and great wealth he accumulated from his father. He died at Sceaux aged 66;
- John Law (pronounced Jean Lass) (21 April 1671 – 21 March 1729) was a Scottish economist who believed that money was only a means of exchange that did not constitute wealth in itself and that national wealth depended on trade. He was responsible for the Mississippi Bubble and a chaotic economic collapse in France; he died in Venice.

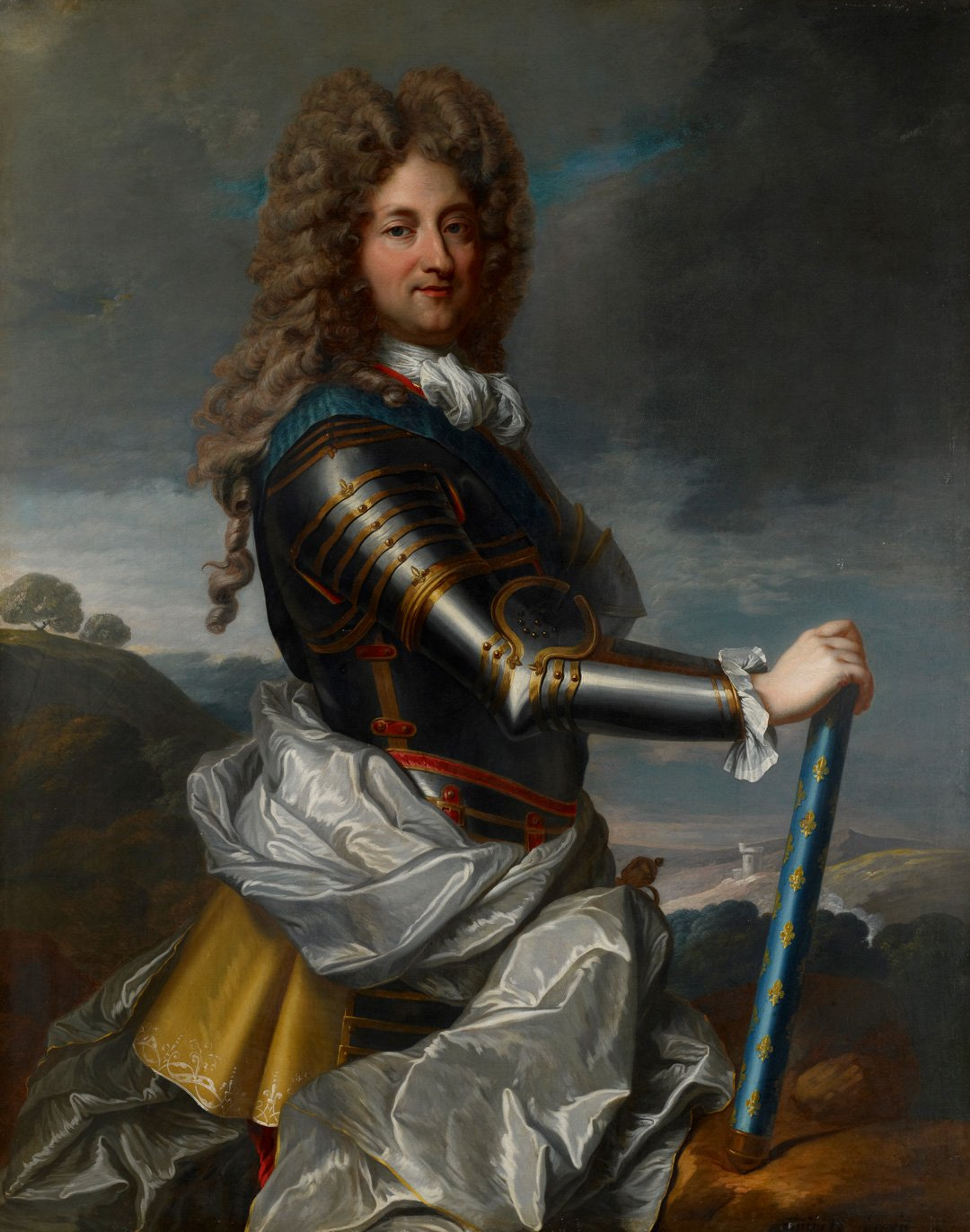
The Duke of Orléans, Régent du royaume

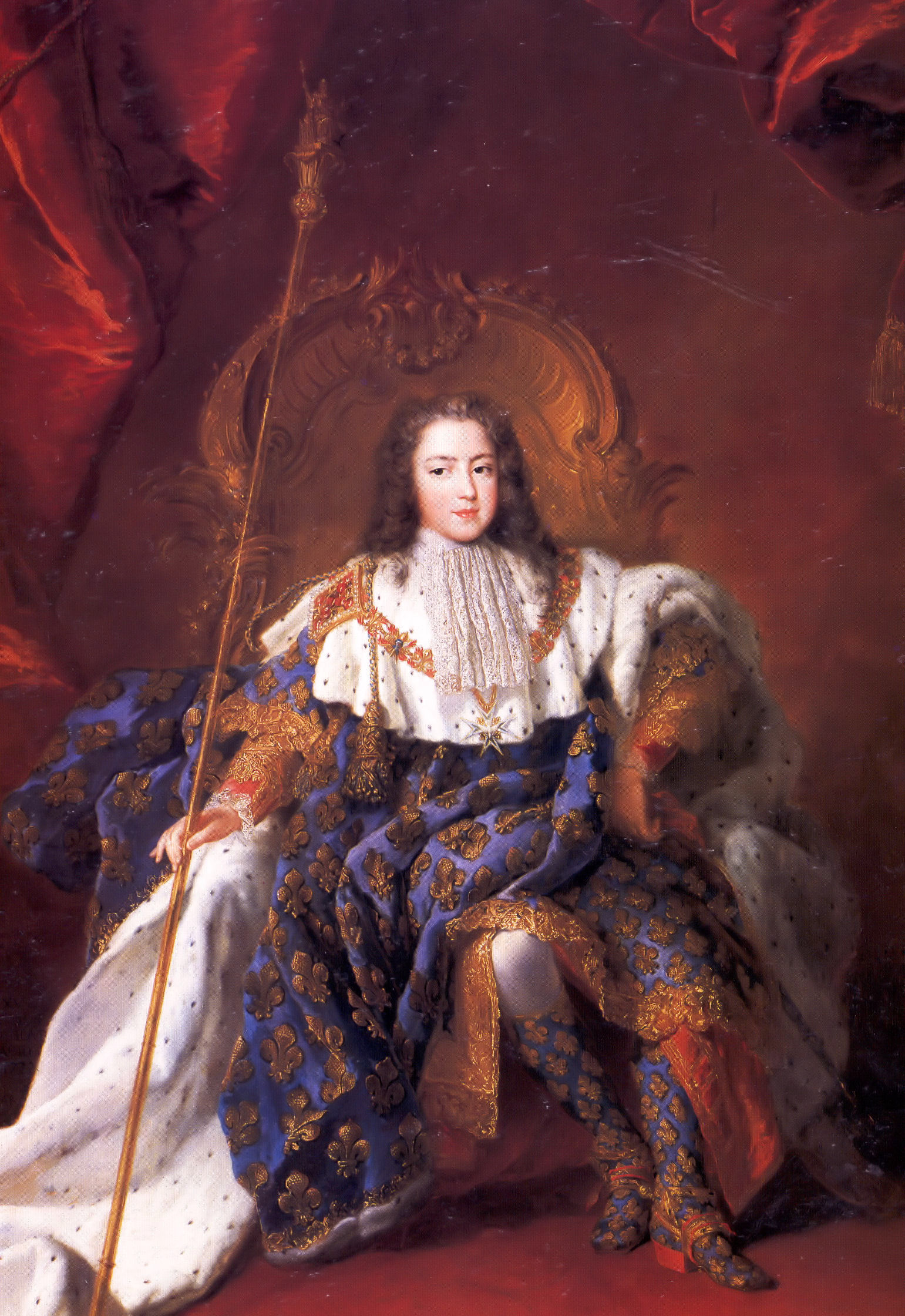
Louis XV in 1723; Rigaud

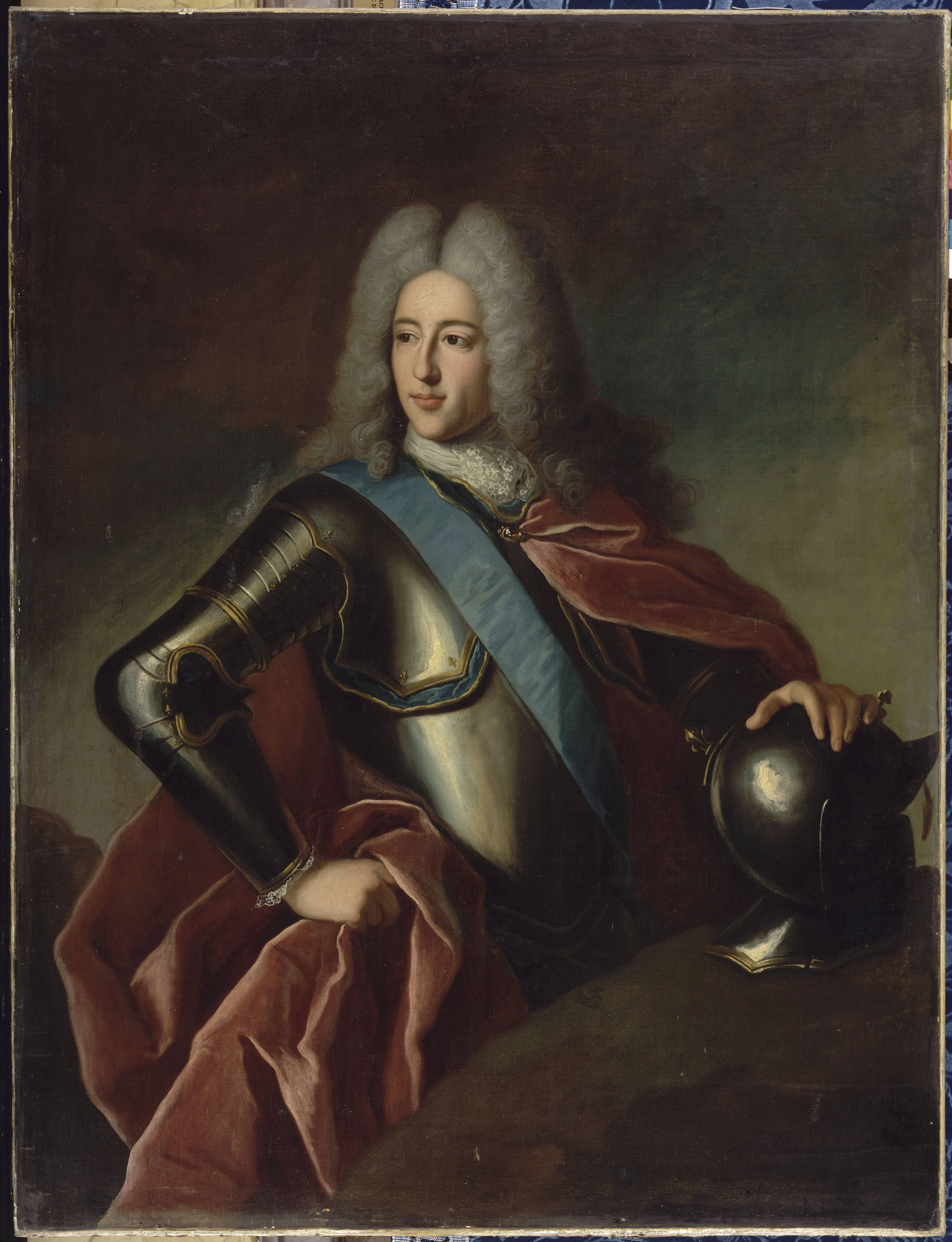
Louis Henri, Duke of Bourbon

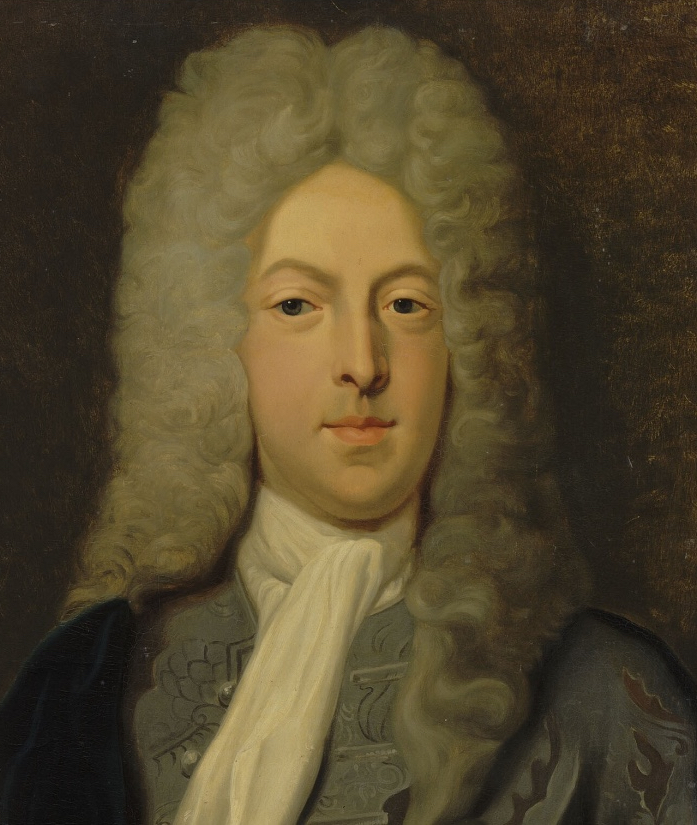
John Law who reformed French Finances

The Women

- Infanta Mariana Victoria of Spain (31 March 1718 – 15 January 1781) was the eldest daughter of Philip V of Spain and his second wife Elisabeth Farnese; born in Madrid, she moved to France in 1721 and lived at the Tuileries Palace in Paris with her proposed husband; the engagement was broken off due to tense relations regarding the marriages of the Regent's daughters to Philip V's sons. The Infanta was sent back to Spain and later married the future Joseph I of Portugal; the present Brazilian Imperial Family descends from Philippe d'Orléans, Louis XV as well as Mariana Victoria;
- Françoise Marie de Bourbon (4 May 1677 – 1 February 1749) was an illegitimate child of Louis XIV and Madame de Montespan. She married Philippe d'Orléans and was mother of 8 of his children including the next Duke of Orléans; she died at the Château de Saint-Cloud aged 71;
- Anne Louise Bénédicte de Bourbon (8 November 1676 – 23 January 1753) was the wife of the Duke of Maine and thus daughter-in-law of Louis XIV; she was one of the Regent's most ardent enemies and was the aunt of the Duke of Bourbon; she was also the granddaughter of the Le Grand Condé; she held court at Sceaux and was exiled to Dijon after the Cellamare Conspiracy was discovered; she died in Paris having outlived most of her generation;

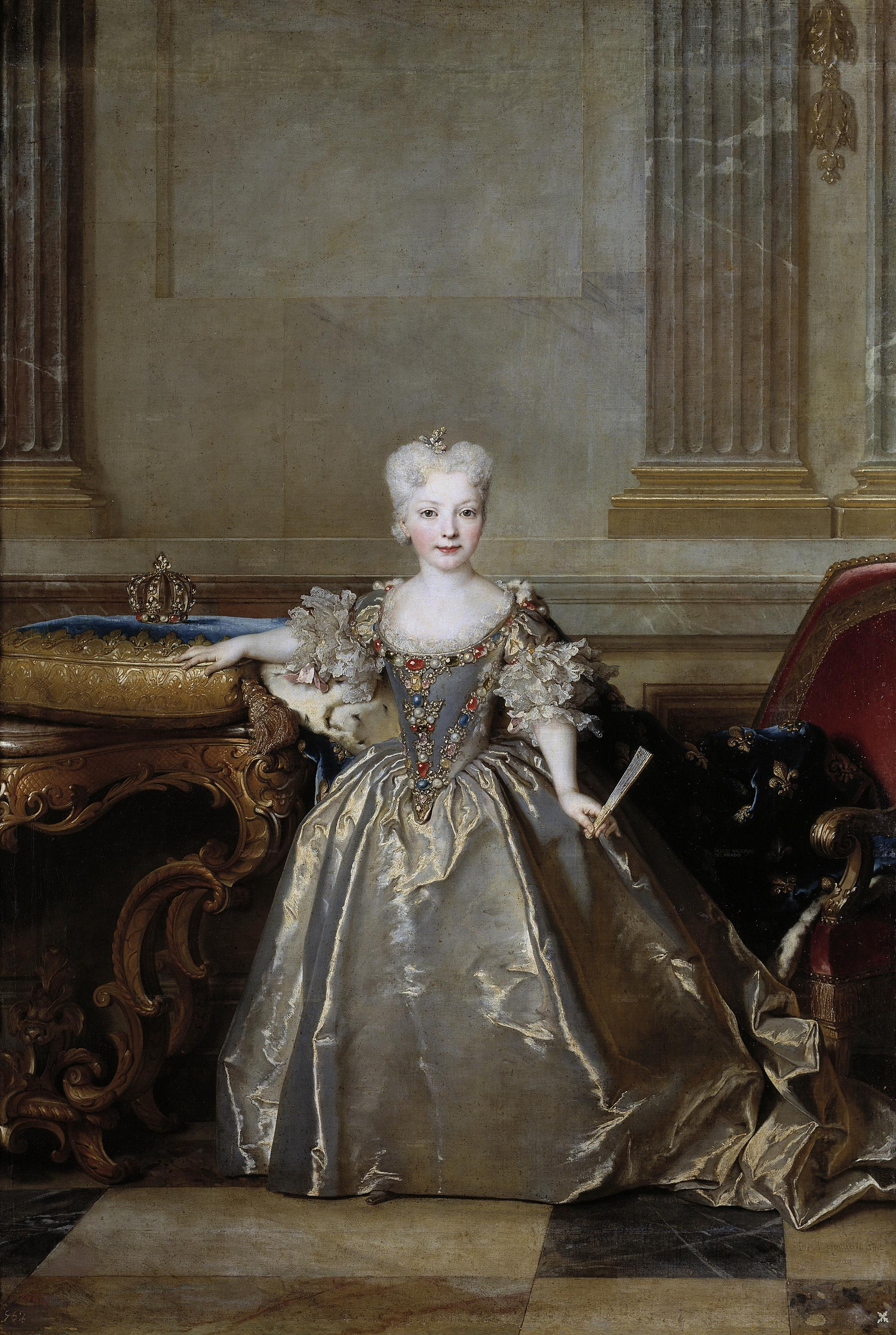
The Infanta Mariana Victoria of Spain

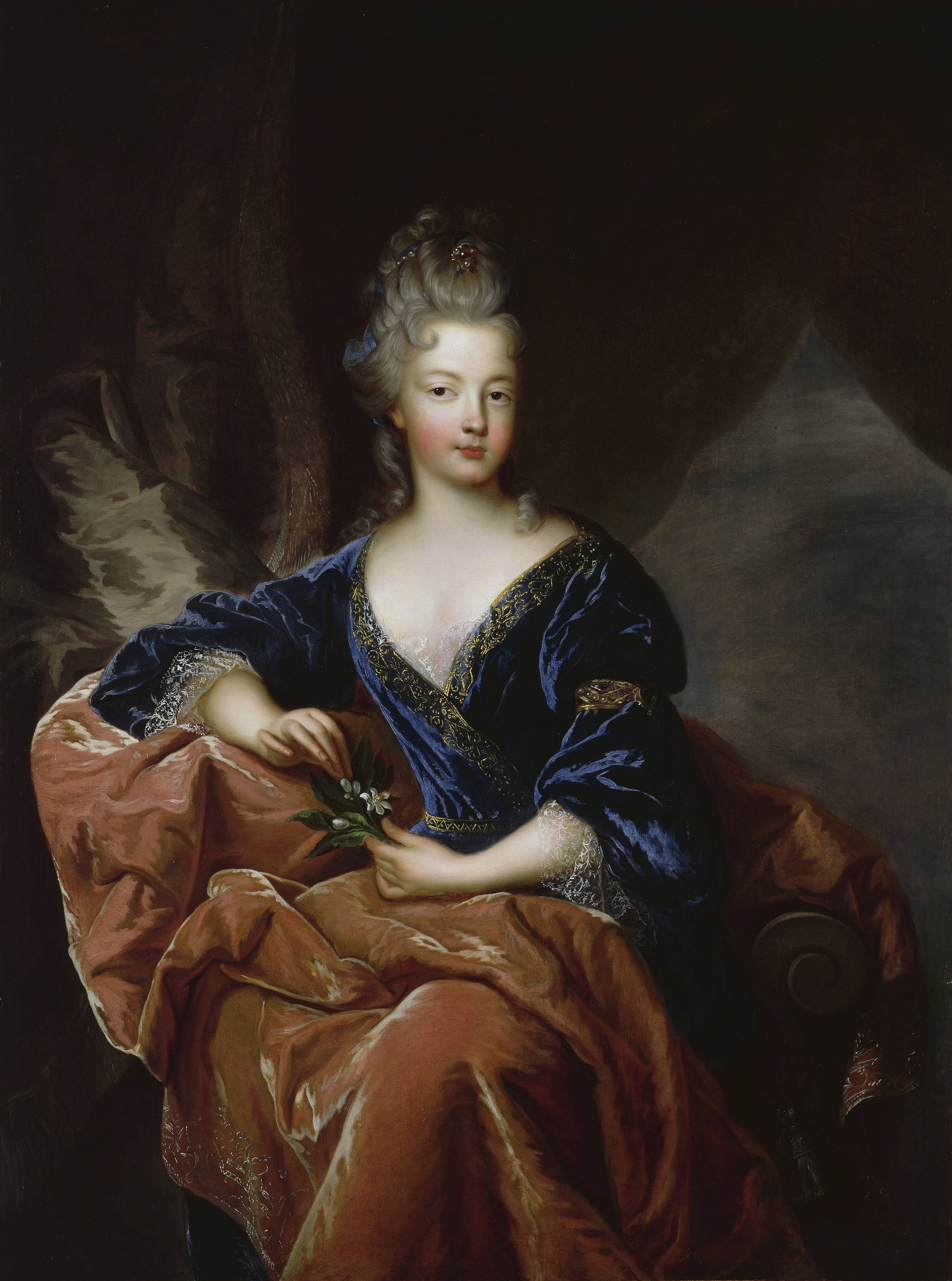
Françoise-Marie de Bourbon, duchesse d'Orléans

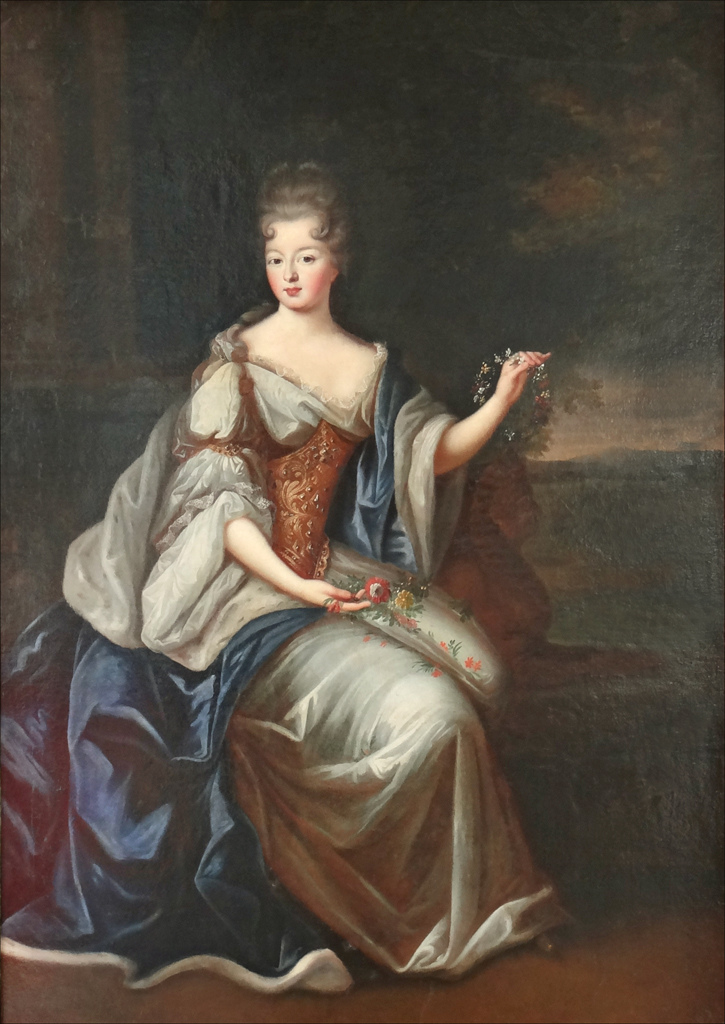
Anne Louise Bénédicte de Bourbon, duchesse du Maine

=== Places ===
- Palace of Versailles : Birthplace of Louis XV and the home of the French court before and after the Regency; it was at Versailles that the Duke of Orléans died in 1723;
- Palais-Royal : Paris home of the House of Orléans; it was from there that the Regent handled state affairs; his last daughter, Louise Diane, was also born at the palace;
- Tuileries Palace : the childhood home of Louis XV during the Regency; Louis XV was installed in the Grand Appartements of Louis XIV located on the second floor.

=== Politics ===
The Régence marked the temporary eclipse of Versailles as centre of policymaking, since the Regent's court was at the Palais Royal in Paris. It marked the rise of Parisian salons as cultural centres, as literary meeting places and nuclei of discreet liberal resistance to some official policies. In the Paris salons aristocrats mingled more easily with the higher Bourgeoisie in a new atmosphere of relaxed decorum, comfort and intimacy.

=== Art history ===
In the arts, the style of the Régence is marked by early Rococo, characterised by the paintings of Antoine Watteau (1684–1721).

Rococo developed first in the decorative arts and interior design. Louis XIV's succession brought a change in the court artists and general artistic fashion. By the end of the old king's reign, rich Baroque designs were giving way to lighter elements with more curves and natural patterns. These elements are obvious in the architectural designs of Nicolas Pineau. During the Régence, court life moved away from Versailles and this artistic change became well established, first in the royal palace and then throughout French high society. The delicacy and playfulness of Rococo designs is often seen as perfectly in tune with the excesses of Louis XV's regime.

The 1730s represented the height of Rococo development in France. The style had spread beyond architecture and furniture to painting and sculpture, exemplified by the works of Watteau and François Boucher. Rococo still maintained the Baroque taste for complex forms and intricate patterns, but by this point, it had begun to integrate a variety of diverse characteristics, including a taste for Oriental designs and asymmetric compositions.

=== Colonialism ===
The Régence is also the customary French word for the pre-independence regimes in the western North African countries, the so-called Barbary Coast. It was applied to:

- First the Barbary Coast (Maghrebinian countries in North Africa) was formally Ottoman, but de facto independent (dominated by military governors, soon de facto princes, styled dey, bey or beylerbey, and by the raïs, Muslim corsairs).

== See also ==
- Liège–Aachen Baroque furniture
