= Rue Coquillière, Paris =

Street in Paris, France

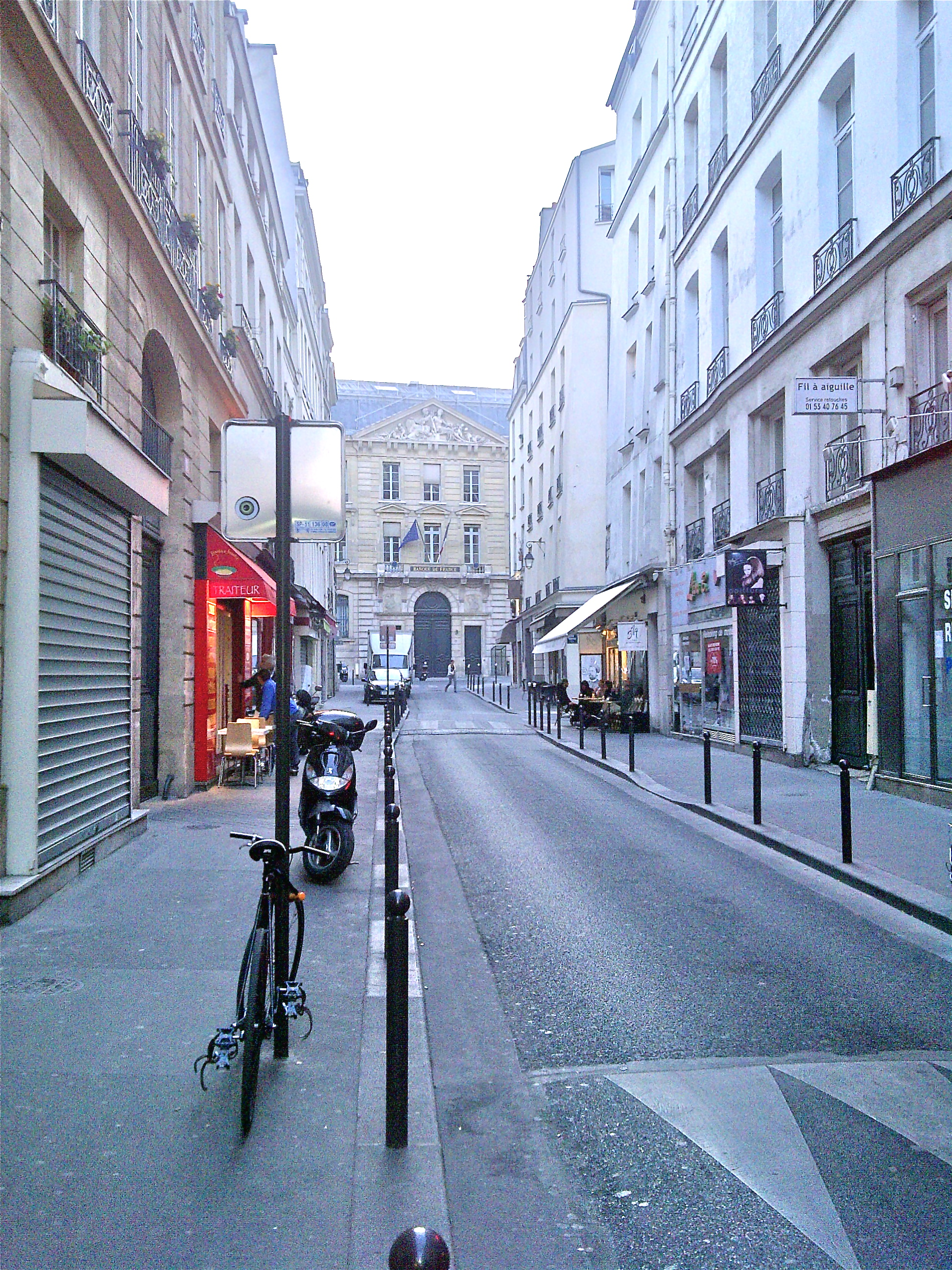
Rue Coquillière

The Rue Coquillière (English: Coquillière Street) is one of the oldest paths of the 1st arrondissement of Paris, France.

== Name origin ==
The name Coquilliere is derived from the name of the land owner and partial builder of the street, Pierre Coquillier.

== Construction and location ==
The street was built entirely in 1292 and opened towards the end of the 13th century, shortly after the construction of the enclosure of Philippe Auguste at no. 10.

The street is situated on the Palais-Royal (part between the Rue Croix-des-Petits-Champs and the Rue du Louvre), and the Halles district (between the Rue du Louvre and Saint-Eustache).

== History ==
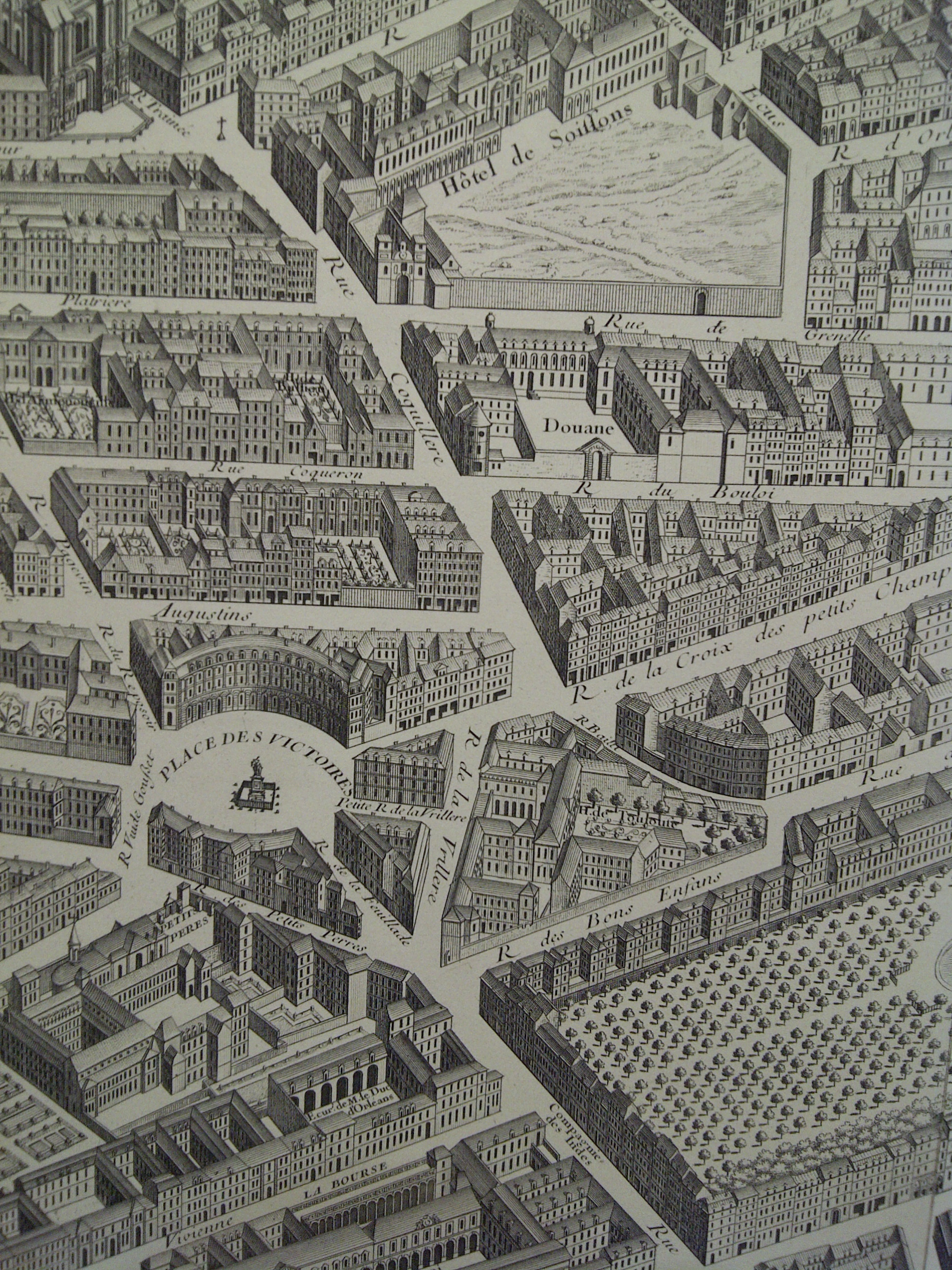
Rue Coquillière c. 1734, extract from the Turgot map

On 15 July 1767, the Oblin-Le Camus de Mézière consortium, which had already won the subdivision of the former Hôtel de Soissons and future builder, for the benefit of Armand-Gaston Camus, the Hôtel de Beauvau and the Hôtel du Tillet street in the Rue des Saussaies, was awarded a house in the Rue Coquilliere, at the corner of the Rue de Grenelle Saint-Honore (now the Rue Jean-Jacques Rousseau), in the prolongation of the old Hôtel de Soissons.

The street has hosted many hotels, such as the Hôtel de Gigault Crisenoy, which was occupied by the town hall of the 14th arrondissement from 1796 to 1803.

== Present day ==
The street consists of residential apartments and offices. There are several restaurants and cafés along the street, as well as a bakery and small chain supermarket.

== Remarkable buildings ==
- At the corner of the Rue du Bouloi and the Rue Coquilliere, there is a Carmelite monastery.
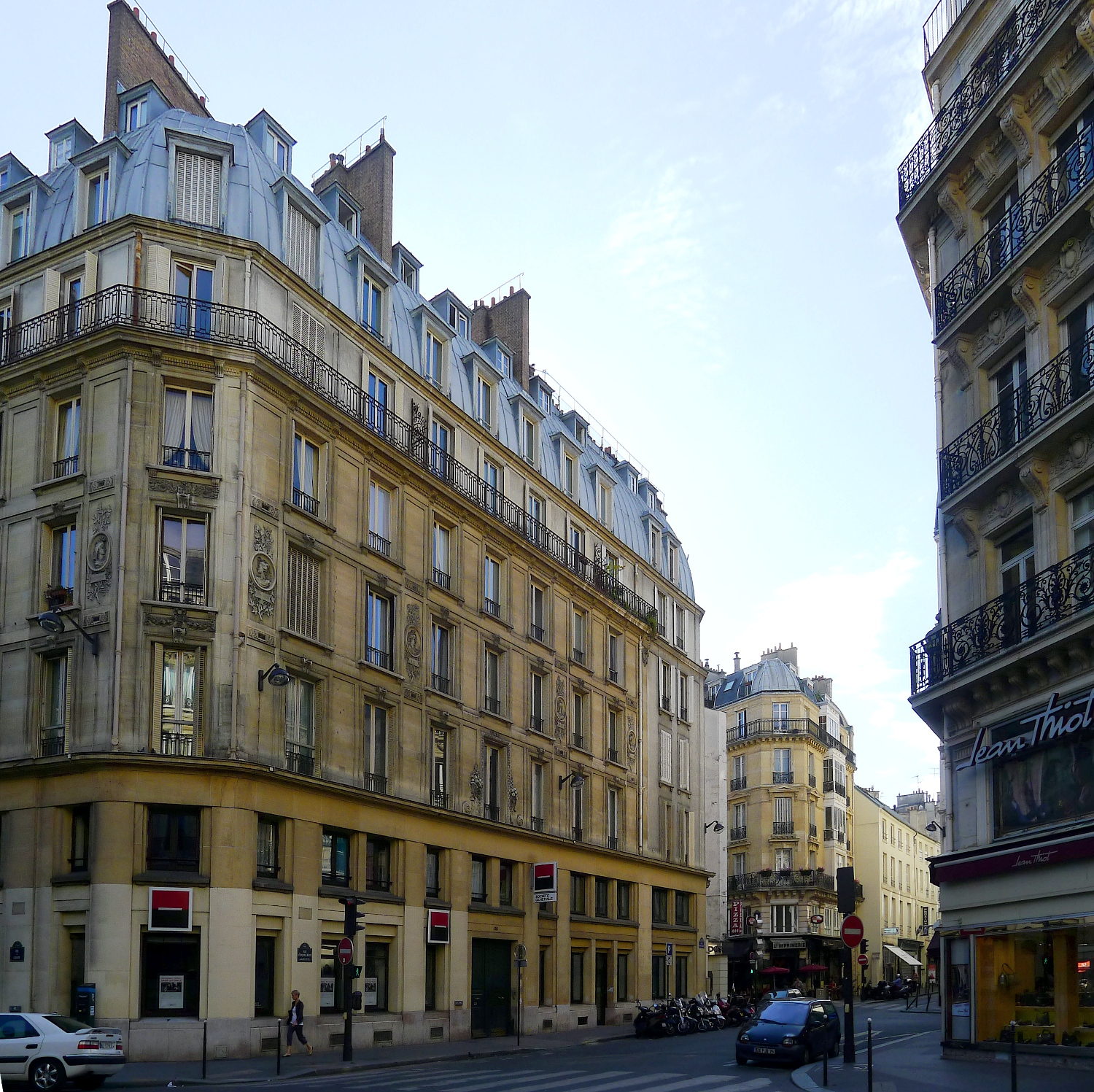
Rue Coquillière view of the Rue du Louvre

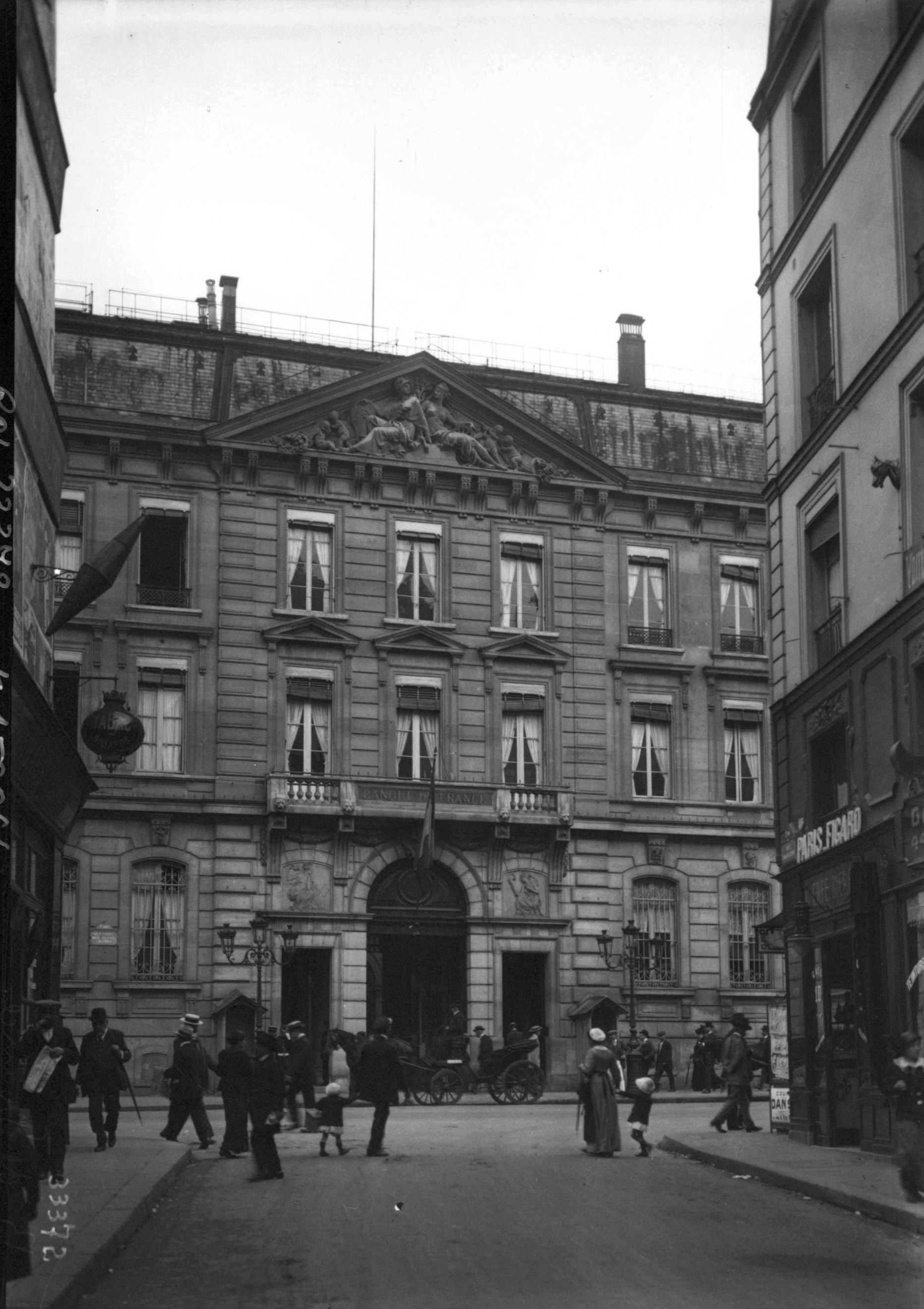
The Hôtel de Toulouse seen from the Rue Coquillière in 1913

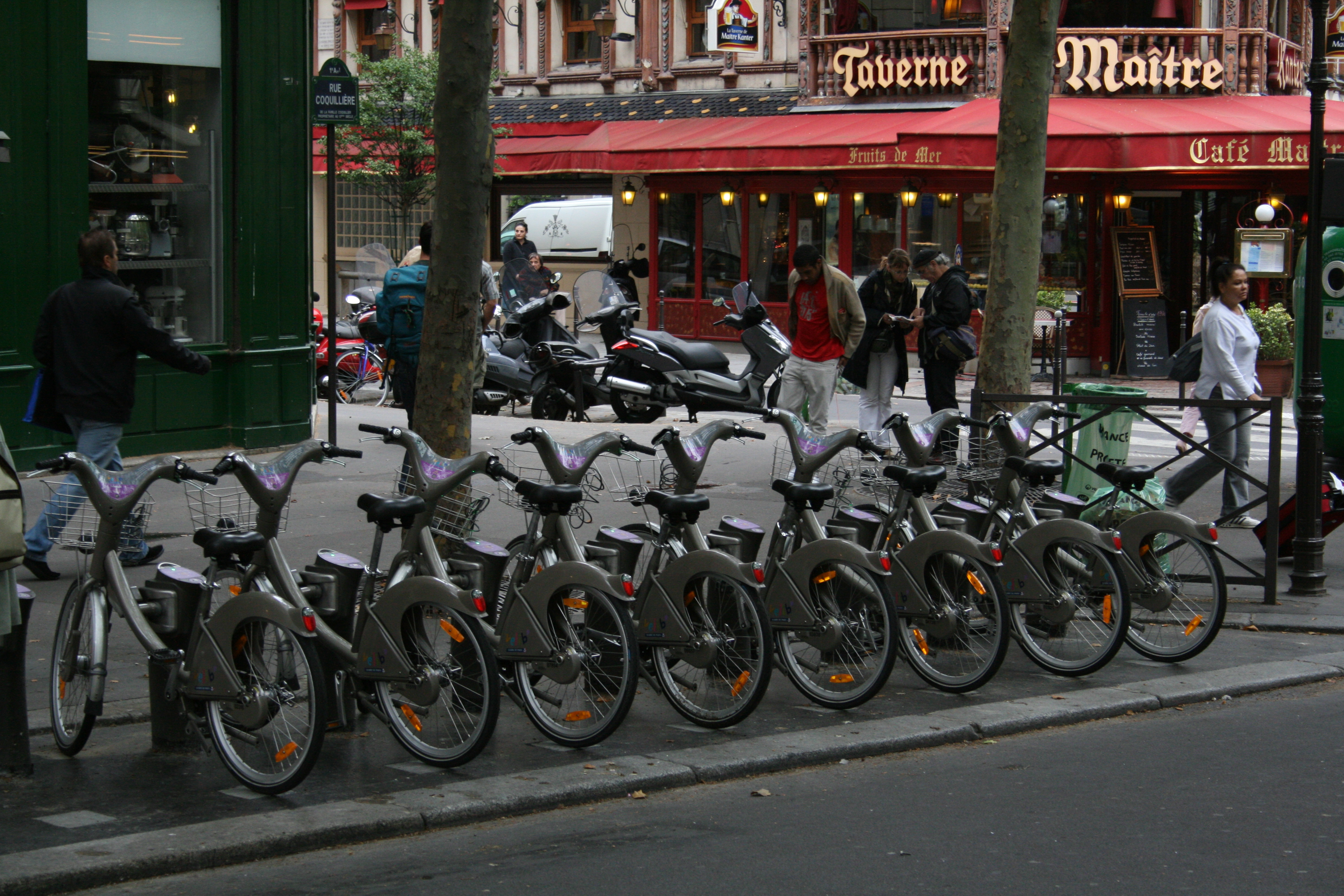
Vélib' of the Rue Coquillière

== Notable persons ==
- Paul Dukas, the composer and music critic, was born in the building at no. 10.
- Sebastien Bottin died in the building at no. 16 in 1863.
