= J. H. Shennan =

British historian

J. H. Shennan FRHistS

Deputy Vice-Chancellor of the University of Lancaster
- In office 1993–1998

Personal details
- Born: Joseph Hugh Shennan; 13 March 1933 Liverpool, Lancashire
- Died: 25 May 2015 (aged 82)
- Profession: Historian

Academic background
- Education: University of Liverpool (BA); University of Cambridge (PhD)

Academic work
- Discipline: History
- Institutions: University of Liverpool; University of Lancaster

Joseph Hugh Shennan FRHistS (13 March 1933 – 25 May 2015) was a British historian who was Professor of European Studies (1974–98) and Deputy Vice-Chancellor (1993–98) at the University of Lancaster. One of the pioneers in European Studies, his research focussed primarily on the history of France during the Ancien Régime as well as on the history of early modern Europe.

== Life ==
Corpus Christi College, Cambridge

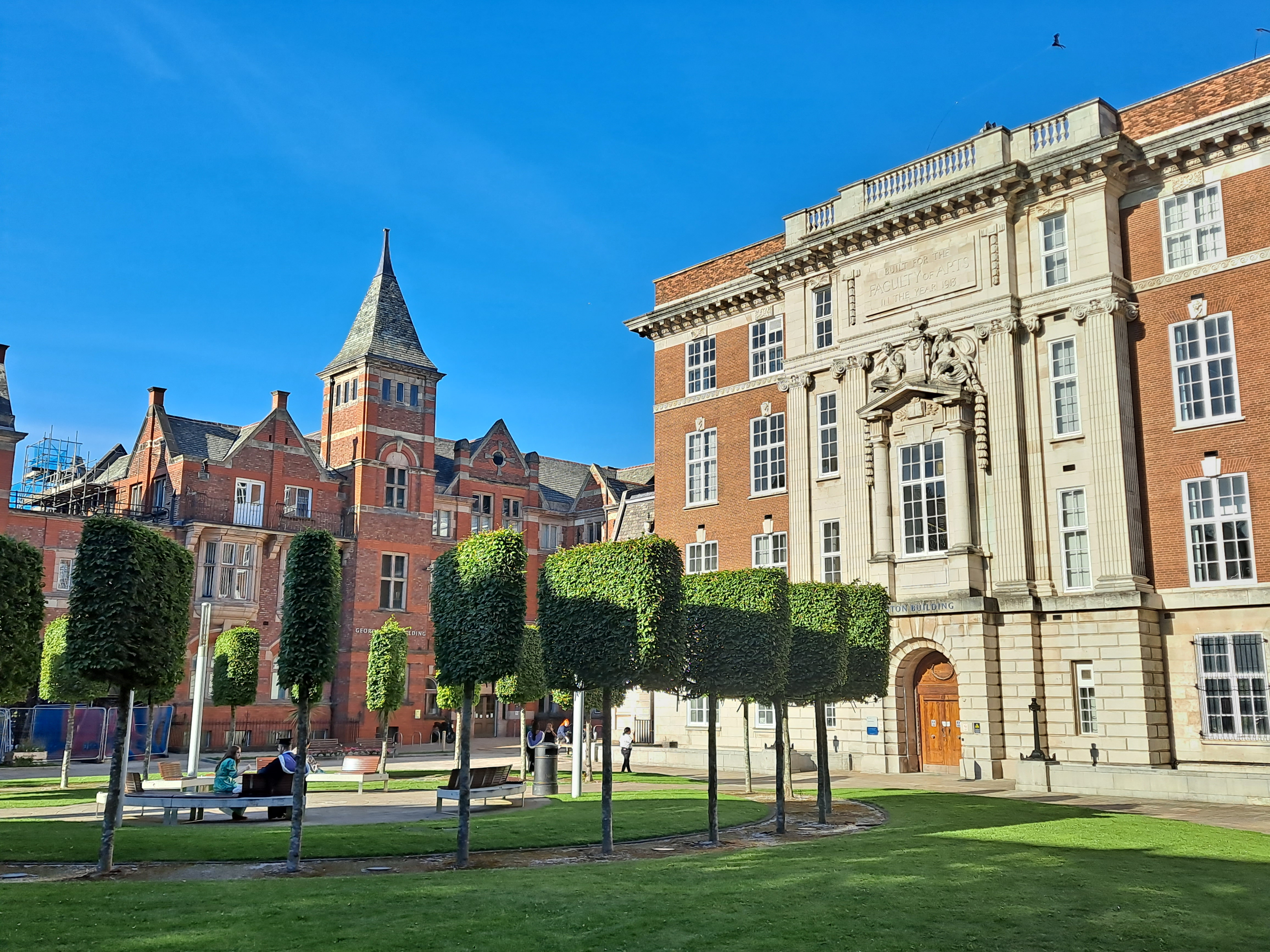
Quadrangle, University of Liverpool

Shennan was born in 1933 to primary school teachers Hugh and Mary Shennan. He studied History at the University of Liverpool where he received a Bachelor of Arts degree in 1955. From 1955 to 1957 he did his National Service. In 1957, he continued his studies at Corpus Christi College, Cambridge where he received his doctorate in 1960. He taught as Assistant Lecturer and later as Lecturer in History at the University of Liverpool.

From 1965, Shennan was employed at the University of Lancaster and played an important role in the establishment of the History Department. Over the years he taught as a Senior Lecturer and Reader. In the 1970s he was one of the pioneers of European Studies. In 1971, he and like-minded people founded the journal European Studies Review which he served as editor until 1979. The journal later became the European History Quarterly.

Alexandra Square, Lancaster University

In 1974, Shennan was appointed Professor of European Studies. As such, he worked on building Lancaster's interdisciplinary School of European Studies and was its first director. From 1979 to 1984, he was Head of the History Department. During this time, he founded the Lancaster Pamphlets, edited by the History Department, to which he also contributed three titles, France before the Revolution (1983), Louis XIV (1986) and International Relations in Europe, 1689–1789 (1995).

In 1985, Shennan was appointed provisional Chancellor and in 1993 he was appointed Deputy Vice-Chancellor of the university. In 1998, he retired.

== Publications ==
- Shennan, J. H. (1968). The Parlement of Paris. Ithaca, N.Y.: Cornell University Press. ISBN 9780750918305.
- Shennan, J. H. (1969). Government and Society in France, 1461–1661. London: George Allen and Unwin Ltd. ISBN 9781000395808.
- Shennan, J. H. (1974). The Origins of the Modern European State, 1450–1725. London: Hutchinson. ISBN 9780091190309.
- Shennan, J. H. (1979). Philippe, Duke of Orléans, Regent of France, 1715–1723. London: Thames and Hudson. ISBN 978-0500870099.
- Shennan, J. H. (1983). France before the Revolution. Lancaster Pamphlets (Rev. 1995 ed.). London: Methuen. ISBN 9780415119450.
- Shennan, J. H. (1986). Liberty and Order in Early Modern Europe: The Subject and the State, 1650–1800. London: Longman. ISBN 9780582494640.
- Shennan, J. H. (1986). Louis XIV. Lancaster Pamphlets (Rev. 1993 ed.). London: Methuen. ISBN 9780415090681.
- Shennan, J. H. (1995). International Relations in Europe, 1689–1789. Lancaster Pamphlets. London: Routledge. ISBN 9780415077804.
- Shennan, J. H. (2007). The Bourbons: The History of a Dynasty. London: Hambledon Continuum. ISBN 9781852855239.
