= Germain Louis Chauvelin =

French politician (1685–1762)

Germain Louis Chauvelin, marquis de Grosbois (26 March 1685 – 1 April 1762, Paris), marquis de Grosbois, was a French politician, serving as garde des sceaux and Secretary of State for Foreign Affairs under Louis XV.

== Life ==
Germain Louis Chauvelin came from a family of lawyers to the Parlement of Paris, which had moved to Paris around 1530 and set up home in the place Maubert quarter. In the 17th century, a branch of the family allied itself with the family of chancellor Michel Le Tellier, who took them into his service and into the service of his son Louvois. Germain Louis Chauvelin was the son of one of those who made such an alliance, Louis III Chauvelin, who was intendant in Franche-Comté (1673–1684) and in Picardy (1684–1694), by his wife, Marguerite Billiard.

On 1 November 1706, Germain Louis Chauvelin was given the joint offices of councillor to the Grand Conseil and of "grand rapporteur et correcteur des lettres de chancellerie". On 31 May 1711, he gained the post of maître des requêtes. On the death of his elder brother, Louis IV Chauvelin, in 1715, he added the officer of avocat général to the parlement de Paris then, in 1718, bought a post as président à mortier, raising him to the top of the judicial hierarchy. In the same year, he married the rich heiress Anne Cahouet de Beauvais, daughter of the 'Premier président du bureau des finances de la généralité d’Orléans'. They had several children :

- Claude Louis (1718–1750), marquis de Grosbois, died without issue;
- Anne Espérance (°1725), who married (1) (1747) Henri René François Édouard Colbert de Maulévrier (†1748) and then (2) (1763) the chevalier des Acres de L'Aigle;
- Anne Madeleine (°1727), who married (1748) Louis-Michel Chamillart (1709–1774), comte de La Suze;
- Anne Sabine Rosalie (°1732), who married (1752) Jean François de La Rochefoucauld (1735–1789), vicomte de La Rochefoucauld, marquis de Surgères.

The maréchal d’Huxelles, president of the council for foreign affairs and member of the Regency council from 1718, presented Chauvelin to cardinal Fleury. Chauvelin became Fleury's collaborator and advisor and when Fleury became prime minister in 1726 he was quick to bring Chauvelin into his cabinet, making him garde des sceaux on 17 August 1727 following the dismissal of Joseph Fleuriau d'Armenonville, then secretary of state for foreign affairs the following day after the dismissal of Charles Jean Baptiste Fleuriau de Morville.

As Garde des sceaux, Chauvelin had to share his powers with Henri François d'Aguesseau, who held onto the unsackable post of Chancellor of France. On 2 September 1727, the king codified the division of powers between the two men : d’Aguesseau held onto his roles as president of the councils and the king's representative to the Parlement, whilst Chauvelin was put in charge of the affairs of the 'Librairie' and given the presidency of the Seal. In this post, Chauvelin exercised censorship over several works linked to the Unigenitus Bull controversy. The seal right also gave him access to major revenue streams. Barbier called him "prodigiously rich". He was also able to buy the château de Grosbois in 1731 from Samuel-Jacques Bernard (1686–1753), son of the financier Samuel Bernard. In 1734, he became 'seigneur engagiste' of the Château de Brie-Comte-Robert, and in 1750 razed its towers and courtyards down to a single storey, sparing the tour Saint-Jean, the seigneurial symbol.

As foreign secretary, Chauvelin was very hostile to Austria, continually seeking to set Spain against Austria. The peace-loving Fleury was often involved in secret negotiations, such as the 1735 preliminaries in Vienna, which subordinated peace to resolution of the Lorraine question - by secret negotiations, Fleury got François de Lorraine to renounce his claim, with Chauvelin only intervening to defeat the last remnants of Austrian resistance. Fleury no longer needed Chauvelin so on 20 February 1737 the latter was dismissed and taken to his château de Grosbois, then to Bourges the following 6 July. He tried for a rapprochement with Louis XV on Fleury's death in January 1743, but was disgraced a second time and exiled to Issoire, then to Riom. Jean de Viguerie observed "Such great rigours are hard to explain. Chauvelin had been one of the confidents of the king, who wrote to him often. But it was maybe that was justly the cause of his disgrace. Louis XV was able to regret being his confident." He was able to return to Paris in April 1746 thanks to the intercession of marquis d’Argenson and the comte de Maurepas but stayed out of political life from that date until his death in 1762.

== Bibliography ==
- (in French) Arnaud de Maurepas, Antoine Boulant, Les ministres et les ministères du siècle des Lumières (1715-1789). Etude et dictionnaire, Paris, Christian-JAS, 1996, 452 p.
- (in French) Jean de Viguerie, Histoire et dictionnaire du temps des Lumières, Robert Laffont, collection Guil, Paris, 1995. ISBN 2-221-04810-5
- (in French) Alix Bréban, Germain Louis Chauvelin (1685-1762), ministre de Louis XV, thesis from the École des chartes, 2004 (résumé)

Political offices
Preceded by Charles Jean Baptiste Fleuriau de Morville	Secretary of State for Foreign Affairs; 1727–1737	Succeeded by Jean-Jacques Amelot de Chaillou
