= Madeleine Fillon =

French madam

Madeleine Fillon, known as La Présidente Fillon or only as La Fillon, was a French brothel madam. La Fillon is known as the procurer of the Prince Regent, Philippe II, Duke of Orléans during the Régence. She is perhaps most known for her role in the Cellamare conspiracy of 1718, when one of the involved parties was a client in her brothel and talked to much, whch resulted in her allerting the authorities and exposed the conspiracy.

== Early life ==
La Fillon was born to a sedan carrier in Paris. She ran away from home with a man at the age of fifteen after having refused an arranged marriage. After having been abandoned by her lover, she turned to prostitution to support herself.

She sold sex to aristocratic men in the gardens of Palais-Royal, which gave her contacts among rich men. Soon, she switched to procure the services of other sex workers to the clients instead, and had thus transformed from a prostitute to a pimp and madam. Prostitution and brothels were banned in Paris since the Mere Cardine in 1566, but in the 18th century, brothels started to occur in Paris again. Having established a network of clients among rich and influential people, she was contacted by the lieutenant-general of police, Marc-René de Voyer de Paulmy d'Argenson (1652–1721), who gave her immunity in exchange for acting as a police informant.

== Career ==
La Fillon was the most famed madam in Paris of the regency period (1715-1723), which was infamous for its decadence. Her brothel was an elite brothel who served aristocratic clients.

There is a famous story as to how she was given the nickname La Présidente Fillon. In 1710 a magistrate from Alençon by the name Fillon arrived in Paris. La Presidente Baillet, married to another magistrate, decided to pay a visit to her eqvivalent, the wife of magistrate Fillon, to show her respect. However, she arrived to the wrong Fillon, and accidentally arrived at the house of the brothel madam La Fillon instead of the wife of President Fillon. The misunderstanding lasted for several minutes before Madame Baillet realised were she was and left. Madeleine Fillon used the anecdote and spread it all over Paris, which gave her the nickname La Présidente Fillon.

During the regency, La Fillon reportedly procured girls for the orgies of the Prince Regent the Duke of Orléans himself. According to one known story, the prince regent was so infatuated with her that he had an artficial cave constructed in the garden of Saint-Cloud, so that he could view her lying there naked under a string of sunshine in order to "reflect over the many advantages of this sinner". Accordng to another anecdote, she asked the prince regent to grant her the post of abbess of the Abbey the Montmartre, in order to receive its income.

== Cellamare conspiracy ==
La Fillon are perhaps most known for the role she played during the Cellamare conspiracy of 1718, an attempted coup d'etat, prepared by the Duke of Maine and the King of Spain to depose the Duke of Orleans as regent for Louis XV of France with his uncle king Philip V of Spain.

One day, an employee of the La Fillon brothel was kept waiting for her appointment with a client. The client was Porto-Carrero, secretary of the ambassador of Spain, the Prince of Cellamare. When he finally arrived, late for his appointment, he appologised and explained that he was late due to being overloaded with work, since Cellamare was sending an unusual amount of reports to Spain. When La Fillon heard this, she informed Guillaume Dubois. A couple of days later, the courier carrying the letters written by Porto-Carrero for Cellamare was arrested in Poitiers.

The information of La Fillon resulted in the exposure of the plot and the arrest of the conspirators. La Fillon was well revarded; however the scandal made the prince regent ask her to remove herself from Paris. She retired wealthy to Auvergne, were she reportedly married a nobleman and lived an anonymous private life.
