= Marron glacé =

Chestnut candy confection from France and Italy

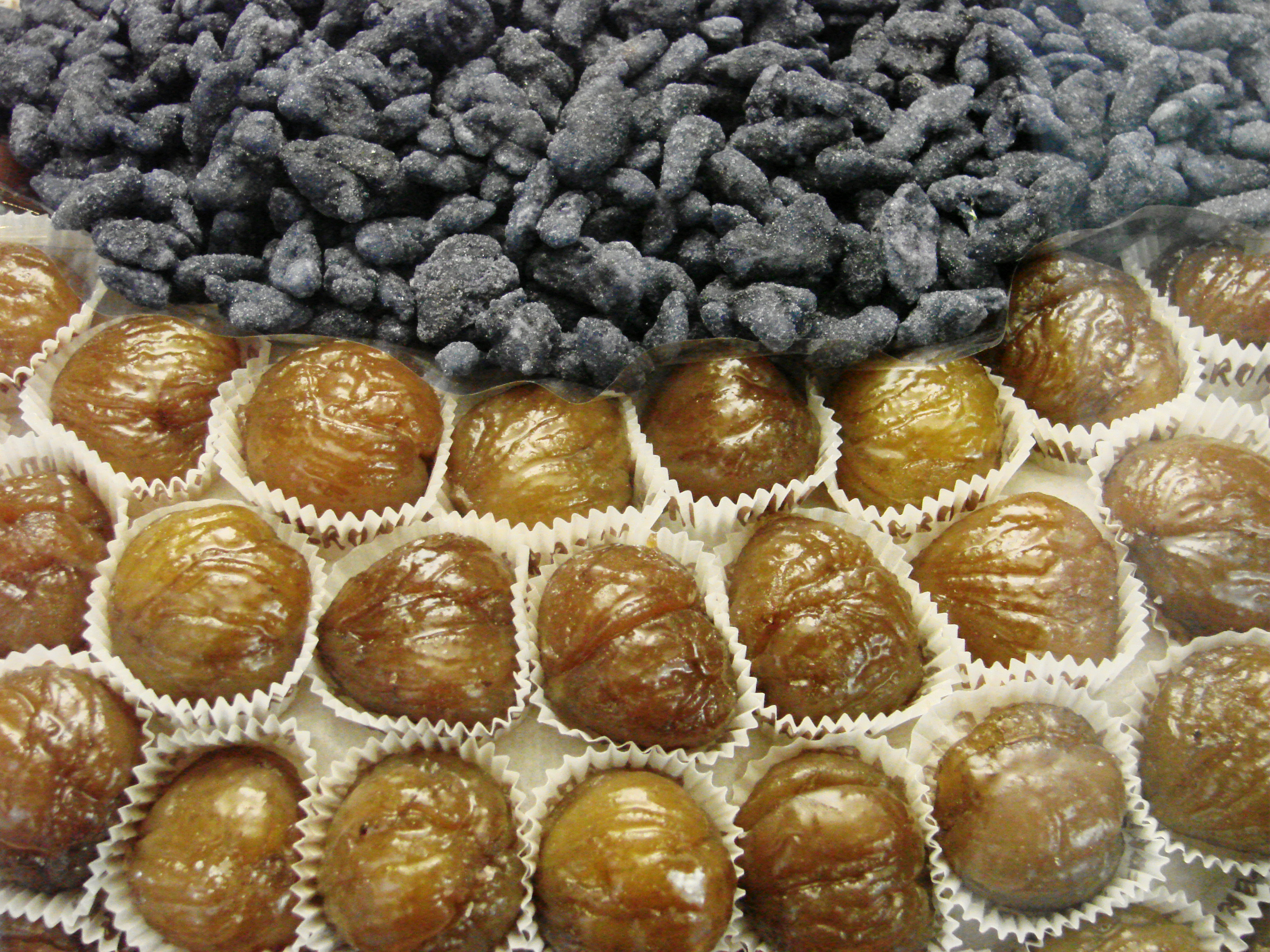
- Type: Confectionery
- Place of origin: France or Italy
- Region or state: Rhône-Alpes or Piedmont
- Main ingredients: Chestnuts, sugar

Marron glacé is a confection originating in France or Italy that consists of a chestnut candied in sugar syrup and glazed. It is an ingredient in many desserts and is also eaten on its own.

== History ==
Candied chestnuts appeared in chestnut-growing areas in Europe shortly after the crusaders returned from the Middle East with sugar. Cooking with sugar allowed creation of new confectioneries. According to some, the birth of the marron glacé occurred around the 16th century (thanks to a greater availability of sugar) in the Cuneo area, where large quantities of chestnuts were collected (and are still collected, to be exported throughout Europe). It seems, according to this theory, that the marron glacé were invented by a court chef of Charles Emmanuel I, Duke of Savoy (1562–1630).The recipe appears in the treatise Confetturiere Piemontese, printed in Turin in 1790 But marron glacé as such (with the last touch of 'glazing'), may have been created only in the 16th century.

In 1667, François Pierre La Varenne, ten years' chef de cuisine to Nicolas Chalon du Blé, Marquis of Uxelles (near Lyon and a chestnut-producing area), and foremost figure of the nouvelle cuisine movement of the time, published his best-selling book Le parfaict confiturier. In it he describes la façon de faire marron pour tirer au sec ("the way to make (a) chestnut (so as) to 'pull it dry'"); this may well be the first record of the recipe for marron glacé. Tirer au sec means, in a confectionery context, 'to remove (what's being candied) from the syrup'. La Varenne's book was edited thirty times over seventy-five years.

Nevertheless, that book was not mentioned (nor indeed any other) when the recipe, applied to cocoa beans, was in 1694 passed on to Jean-Baptiste Labat, a French missionary in Martinique. That year he wrote in a letter of a recipe for candied and iced cocoa beans which he had tasted when dining at a M. Pocquet's. Another early citation, still in French, is from 1690.

Towards the end of the 19th century, Lyon was suffering from the collapse of the textile market, notably silk. In the midst of this crisis, Clément Faugier, a bridge and roadworks engineer, was looking for a way to revitalize the regional economy. In 1882, in Privas, Ardèche, he and a local confectioner set up the first factory with the technology to produce marron glacé industrially (though many of the nearly twenty steps necessary from harvest to finished product are still performed manually). Three years later, he introduced the crème de marrons de l'Ardèche, a sweetened chestnut purée made from marron glacé broken during the production process, flavoured with vanilla. (later came Marrons au Cognac in 1924, Purée de Marrons Nature in 1934, Marrons au Naturel in 1951, and Marpom's in 1994.)

The same process was used in 1980 by José Posada in Ourense, Spain. He was the first businessman to build a factory to produce Spanish marron glacé using Galician raw chestnuts.

== Châtaigne or marron ==
The French refer to chestnuts as châtaigne or marron. Both terms refer to the fruit of the sweet chestnut Castanea sativa. However, marron tends to denote a higher quality, larger fruit that is more easily peeled. The fifth edition of the dictionary Dictionnaire de l'Académie française. Revu, corrigé et augmenté published in 1798 states that a marron glacé is a confit marron that is covered in caramel. The 1767 book L'agronome, ou dictionnaire portatif du cultivateur claimed that the best marron came from the Dauphiné region in southeastern France, and contained instructions for preparing marron glacé.

Chestnuts are covered with a membrane, known as a pellicle or episperm, which closely adheres to the fruit's flesh and must be removed because of its astringency. Marron-quality nuts have a pellicle which is "superficially attached to the nut", making it easily removable from the fruit. Some chestnuts have two cotyledons usually separated with deep grooves penetrating nearly all the way through the fruit; this makes them too fragile for the necessary manipulations during the cooking process. There also are other grooves on the surface, which means more embedded pellicle that must be painstakingly removed. Marron-quality nuts do not have the separation into two cotyledons; it appears in one piece and it shows few very shallow grooves.

In Italy, the term marrone denotes a specific high-quality cultivar of Castanea sativa bearing oblong fruits with a shiny, reddish epicarp and often exhibiting a small rectangular hilar scar. As with the French use of the term, there should be no division of the cotyledons.

Marron-quality nuts for marron glacé may be three or four times more expensive than the châtaigne because they also have a lower yield as the husk usually contains only one or two nuts and the plants have sterile male flowers.

== In Brazil ==
A similarly-named confection, marrom glacê, is eaten in Brazil, although instead of chestnuts it is more typical to use candied sweet potato.

== In Turkey ==
Candied chestnuts are a speciality of Bursa, Turkey, where they are called kestane şekeri (chestnut candy).

== See also ==
Media related to Marron glacé at Wikimedia Commons

- Lyonnaise cuisine
