= Nicolas Chalon du Blé =

French general and Foreign Minister

- Marquis of Uxelles and Cormatin
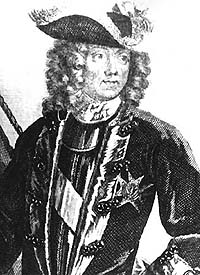
- Born: 24 January 1652; Chalon-sur-Saône, France
- Died: 10 April 1730 (aged 78); Paris, France
- Father: Louis Chalon du Blé, Marquis of Uxelles
- Mother: Marie Le Bailleul
- Military career
- Allegiance: Kingdom of France
- Rank: Marshal of France
- Wars: Nine Years' War; Siege of Philippsburg; Siege of Mainz
- Awards: Order of the Holy Spirit; Order of Saint Michael

Nicolas Chalon du Blé, marquis d'Uxelles and Cormatin (24 January 1652 – 10 April 1730) was a French general and Foreign Minister. He was also created a knight and Marshal of France by Louis XIV, and was a diplomat for Louis XIV and Philippe II, Duke of Orléans.

== Biography ==
Coat of Arms of the du Blé family, Burgundy.

=== Early years ===
du Blé was born at Chalon-sur-Saône.

His appearance was described as tall and ruddy, with a huge wig and a hat pulled down over his eyes. He tended to hide his military orders and decorations under a plain, tightly buttoned coat.

Second son of Louis Chalon du Blé, marquis of Uxelles (who died in 1658 at the siege of Gravelines), and of Marie Le Bailleul (1626–1712), Nicolas Chalon du Blé became marquis d'Uxelles on the death of his elder brother in 1669. He was a protégé of Camille le Tellier de Louvois.

=== Military career ===
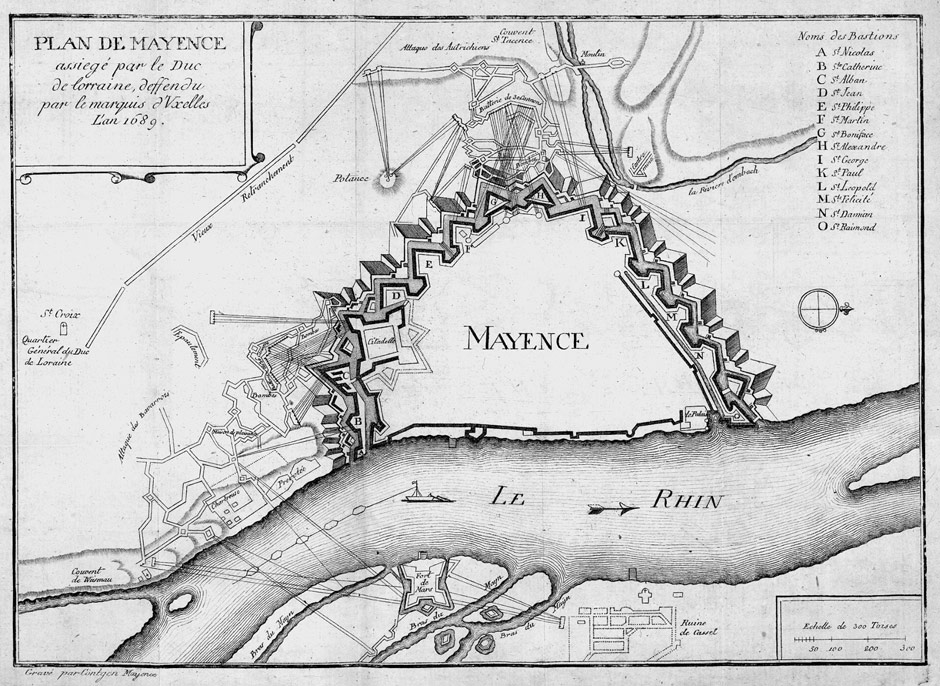
Map of the Siege of Mayence, in 1689. Engraving, Paris, 1756

He was granted military leadership in 1688, during the Nine Years' War; he served as lieutenant general at the siege of Philippsburg, and was charged with holding the Place de Mayence fortress in Mainz, when the French army was forced to retreat.

He initially defended during the Siege of Mainz against the Grand Alliance, from 1 June to 8 September 1689, but had to surrender, and was publicly booed upon his return to Paris. He retained the favor of François-Michel le Tellier, Marquis de Louvois and King Louis XIV, and was rewarded with the fief of Rougemont-le-Château (1696), and he received the baton of Marshal, in 1703.

=== Diplomatic career ===
He took part as a diplomat at the preliminary conferences of Geertruidenberg on 9 March 1710, but the peace negotiations were broken by Louis XIV at the end of the following June. Chalon du Blé again represented the king during the negotiation for the Peace of Utrecht in 1713.

He was one of the aristocratic architects of the polysynody system of government, and obtained the first presidency of the Council of Foreign Affairs, (1715–1718) when the regency of Philippe II began. This appointment was made against the better judgement of the Regent, who held different foreign policy aims than Blé, and who had been the target of scorn from Blé's social circle. The Regent made the decision primarily to keep his enemy in plain view rather than in subterfuge against the government.

As president of the Council of Foreign Affairs, Blé tended to the popular, traditional French view of favoring Catholic Spain over Protestant Great Britain. This was in contradiction to the Regent, who admired Britain's parliamentary system and open economy. When the Cellamare Conspiracy came to light in 1718, however, Blé gave up antagonizing the Regent and "became polite, agreeable, and ate from his hand" in the words of Saint-Simon. According to one source, the Regent even made Blé kiss the Treaty of the Triple Alliance, which allied France with Britain and the Dutch Republic against Spain.

Nicolas Chalon du Blé was one of the most notable homosexuals of his age, known for his attraction to young valets as well as aspiring officers whom he "domesticated". He died in Paris in 1730.

Political offices
Preceded by Jean-Baptiste Colbert, marquis de Torcy	Minister of Foreign Affairs; 23 September 1715 – 1 September 1718	Succeeded by Guillaume Dubois
