= Portrait of Cardinal Dubois =

Painting by Hyacinthe Rigaud

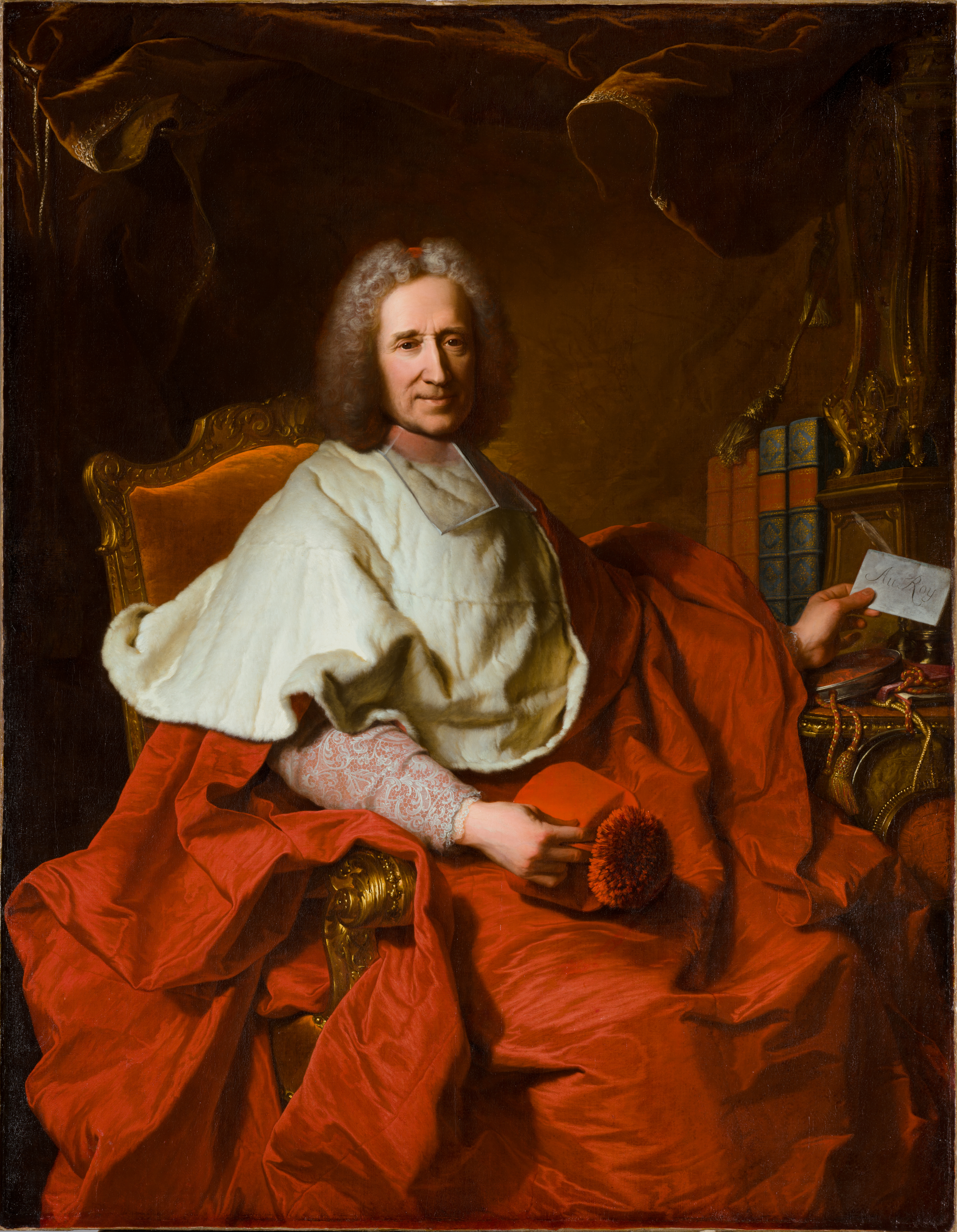
- Artist: Hyacinthe Rigaud
- Year: 1723
- Type: Oil on canvas, portrait painting
- Dimensions: 146.7 cm × 113.7 cm (57.8 in × 44.8 in)
- Location: Cleveland Museum of Art, Cleveland

Portrait of Cardinal Dubois is an oil on canvas portrait painting by the French artist Hyacinthe Rigaud, from 1723, depicting Cardinal Guillaume Dubois. It is held in the Cleveland Museum of Art.

== History and description ==
Dubois served as Chief minister of France during the Régence era. Following the death of Louis XIV, in 1715, his successor, Louis XV, was still a child and so a regency was formed under his cousin Duke of Orleans, until the young king came of age in 1723. Dubois, as the former tutor of the Duke, was made his chief minister (effectively a forerunner of the post-1814 office of prime minister). A notable policy was the Anglo-French Alliance of 1716, a pact with France's previous enemies Great Britain. During his time in office the Cellamare conspiracy was thwarted. In the tradition of Richelieu and Mazarin he combined the role of a statesman and clergyman. In 1721 he was elevated to the position of cardinal by Pope Innocent XIII. He still held office at his death in August 1723 at Versailles.

Dubois is shown seated in a cabinet. He wears a wrap of scarlet silk with a shorter fur cape and holds a letter marked "Au Roy" (To the King), celebrating the moment when he had the honour to proclaim the new king.. The books shown on the desk besides are notable legal works.

== Bibliography ==
- Black, Jeremy. From Louis XIV to Napoleon: The Fate of a Great Power. Routledge, 2013.
- Dauchy, Serge, Martyn, Georges, Musson, Anthony, Pihlajamäki, Heikki & Wijffels, Alain. The Formation and Transmission of Western Legal Culture: 150 Books that Made the Law in the Age of Printing. Springer, 2016.
- Dhondt, Frederik. Balance of Power and Norm Hierarchy: Franco-British Diplomacy after the Peace of Utrecht. BRILL, 2015,
- Perreau, Stéphan. Hyacinthe Rigaud, 1659-1743: le peintre des rois. Presses du Languedoc, 2004.
- Watrelot, Michaela. Wilhelm von Bode and the American Art Market: The Rudolphe Kann Collection. Taylor & Francis, 2023.
