= Triple Alliance (1717) =

1717 treaty between the Netherlands, France, and Britain

The Triple Alliance was a defence pact signed on 4 January 1717 in The Hague between the Dutch Republic, France and Great Britain, against Bourbon Spain in an attempt to maintain the agreements of the 1713–15 Peace of Utrecht. The three states were concerned about Spain becoming a superpower in Europe. As a result, militarisation took place and caused great havoc to civilians. That enraged Spain and other states and led to brinkmanship. The alliance became the Quadruple Alliance the next year, after the accession of Holy Roman Emperor Charles VI.

== Background ==
The War of the Spanish Succession had ended with a compromise: Philip V of Bourbon was recognised as king of Spain, but he and his descendants had to renounce all claims to the French throne, while the French king Louis XIV and his descendants had to renounce all claims to the Spanish throne. Philip V also had to cede Sicily to Savoy, and the Spanish Netherlands, Milan, Sardinia and Naples to Austria. Philip resented these conditions, and sought to recapture the lost territories to strengthen Spain in the post-war period without starting a new great war. Meanwhile, he supported the Cellamare conspiracy to seize the French regency (exerted by Philippe II, Duke of Orléans over infant king Louis XV) for himself.

After the deaths of Louis XIV and Queen Anne, relations between France and Great Britain improved. The new British king George I and the new French regent Philippe of Orléans were cousins, and both regimes faced threats. Orléans was concerned that his domestic enemies, particularly Louis Auguste de Bourbon, Duc de Maine, would combine with Spain to overthrow him, and George I wished to persuade the French to withhold support for any further Jacobite risings.

== Formation ==
According to Louis de Rouvroy, duc de Saint-Simon, who opposed the alliance, the British Ambassador to Paris, John Dalrymple, 2nd Earl of Stair, argued that the short-term advantage to both regimes of an alliance outweighed their traditional differences. Orléans agreed, as did his secretary Guillaume Dubois, the future Cardinal, together with James Stanhope, 1st Earl Stanhope, the English Secretary of State, who is generally regarded as the principal author of the alliance.

The Anglo-French Alliance (1716–1731) was concluded on 9 or 10 October 1716. It took several months to be ratified. Then, on 4 January 1717, the Dutch Republic concluded a defence pact with Britain and France in The Hague, in effect enlarging the bilateral alliance to a trilateral one.

== Contents of the agreement ==
On 4 January 1717, Guillaume Dubois and Pierre Antoine de Châteauneuf sent by Philip II of Orléans (regent of France during the minority of King Louis XV), William Cadogan representing George I of Great Britain and the delegates of the States General of the Netherlands, reunited in the city of The Hague, signed the agreement, which included as main points the following:

- Ratification of the agreements reached in the treaties of Utrecht of 1713.
- France would expel James Stuart, pretender to the English crown, from his residence in Avignon.
- The Dutch Republic would expel from their territory the supporters of James Stuart, considered rebels against England.
- France should demolish the Mardyke Canal, built after the dismantling of the port of Dunkirk as agreed in the Treaty of Utrecht.
- In the event that one of the signatory countries saw its territory invaded by forces of a foreign country or had to face internal rebellions, the other two would provide military help. In such a case, France and England would contribute 8,000 infantry and 2,000 cavalry each; the Dutch Republic would contribute 4,000 infantry and 1,000 cavalry. At the request of the invaded country, these troops could be replaced by an equivalent naval force. This point would only be valid in the territories of the signatories in Europe.

== Aftermath ==
In 1718, with the adhesion of the Holy Roman Empire through the signing of the Treaty of London, it became the Quadruple Alliance.

Saint-Simon, who loathed Dubois, argued that the Bourbon Kingdoms of France and Spain should be perpetual allies, but that took no account of present realities. The Spanish conquest of Sardinia (22 August – 30 October 1717) and the Cellamare conspiracy fully justified Orléans's concerns about Spanish intentions, and the successful conclusion to the War of Quadruple Alliance vindicated the decision to ally with Great Britain and the Dutch Republic.

== Bibliography ==
- Almon, J. (1772). A Collection of All the Treaties of Peace, Alliance, and Commerce, Between Great-Britain and Other Powers: From the Revolution in 1688, to the Present Time. Great Britain.
- Earl Russell (1826). History of the principal states of Europe from the peace of Utrecht, Volume 2. John Murray. p. 102.

== See also ==
- List of treaties
