= Carl Rangenier =

German sculptor (1829–1895)

Carl Christoph Conrad Rangenier (December 17, 1829, in Hanover – October 20, 1895, in Bautzen) was a German sculptor, best remembered for his sculpture of George I of Great Britain at Guelph Castle in 1862, and the altar crucifix for the Evangelical Lutheran parish church in Graste in 1864 under Conrad Wilhelm Hase.
