= Joseph Fleuriau d'Armenonville =

French politician (1661 – 1728)

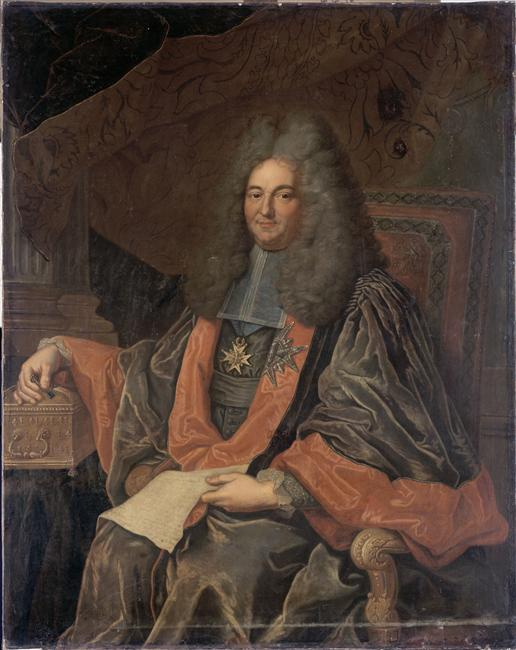
Joseph Fleuriau d'Armenonville, a portrait by Hyacinthe Rigaud.

Joseph Jean Baptiste Fleuriau, seigneur d'Armenonville (22 January 1661 – 27 November 1728) was a French politician.

Fleuriau d'Armenonville was born in Paris and obtained a place in government service in 1683 through his brother-in-law, Claude Le Peletier de Morfontaine, then Controller-General of Finances. He served in the financial administration until 1689 when he purchased a post as councillor serving with the Parlement at Metz. He returned to the finance in 1701 when he was named as director-general of finances, holding the sinecures of "bailli and captain" of Chartres. In 1705 he was appointed to the senior grade of Conseiller d'État.

In 1716, he was appointed Secretary of State for Foreign Affairs, a post which was then without any responsibilities as foreign affairs were in fact directed by the Cardinal Dubois. Fleuriau d'Armenonville arranged to have the post pass to his son, Charles Jean Baptiste Fleuriau de Morville (Charles, Count of Morville), who duly took over responsibility for foreign affairs from 16 August 1723, following the death of Cardinal Dubois.

Fleuriau d'Armenonville became Secretary of State for the Navy on 24 September 1718, taking over responsibility from the council led by Louis-Alexandre de Bourbon, Comte de Toulouse, who resigned from the regency, which had previously directed affairs under the polysynody. He remained in office until 1722 when his son Charles took up the post. On leaving the Navy ministry, he became keeper of the seals, holding that office until he resigned on 14 August 1727.

Fleuriau d'Armenonville purchased the Château de Rambouillet from the duc d'Uzès in 1699 for 140,000 livres. He spent half a million livres on works, but sold to the Count of Toulouse in 1706, receiving in return half a million livres and the post of master of the hunt in the Bois de Boulogne and surrounds, an office which brought with it the use of the Château de Madrid.

Fleuriau d'Armenonville's son Charles Jean Baptiste, Count of Morville, followed him in government service.

== See also ==
- List of Naval Ministers of France
- List of Justice Ministers of France
- Minister of Foreign Affairs (France)
- P. G. T. Beauregard Great-great-grandson of Joseph Fleuriau d'Armenonville.
