= Guillaume Dubois =

French cardinal and statesman (1656–1723)

His Eminence Guillaume Dubois OSB
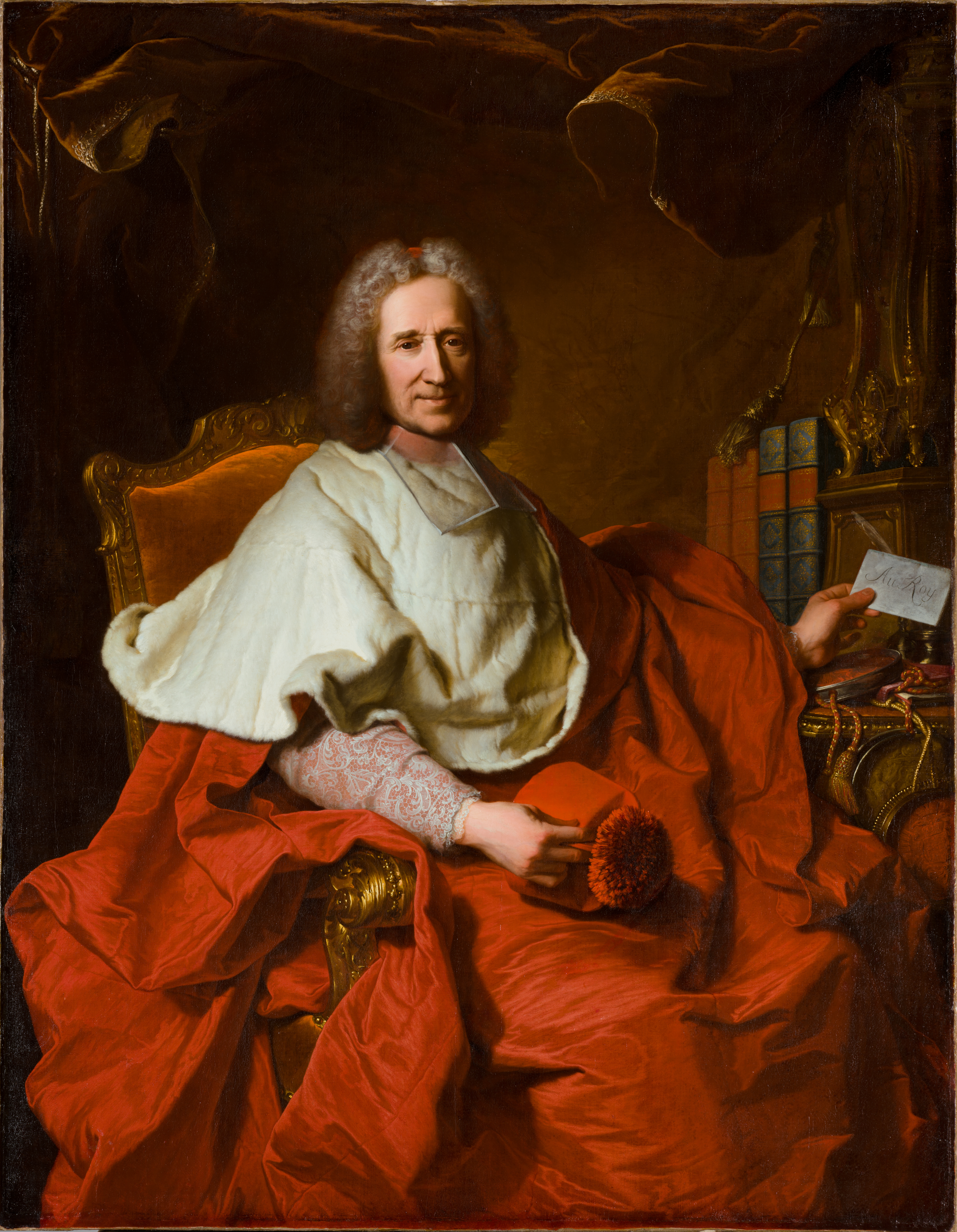
- Portrait of Cardinal Dubois by Hyacinthe Rigaud, 1723

Chief Minister of the French Monarch
- In office August 1722 – 10 August 1723
- Monarchs: Louis XV; Philippe II of Orléans (as Regent)
- Preceded by: Jean-Baptiste Colbert (1661–1683)
- Succeeded by: Philippe II, Duke of Orléans

Secretary of State for Foreign Affairs
- In office 24 September 1718 – 10 August 1723
- Monarchs: Louis XV; Philippe II of Orléans (as Regent)
- Preceded by: Nicolas Chalon du Blé
- Succeeded by: Charles Jean-Baptiste Fleuriau

Member of the Académie française
- In office 20 September 1722 – 10 August 1723
- Preceded by: André Dacier
- Succeeded by: Charles-Jean-François Hénault
- Cardinal, Archbishop of Cambrai
- Church: Roman Catholic Church
- Archdiocese: Cambrai
- Province: Lille
- Metropolis: Lille
- Appointed: 6 May 1720
- Term ended: 10 August 1723
- Predecessor: Joseph-Emmanuel de La Trémoille
- Successor: Charles de Saint-Albin

Orders
- Ordination: 25 February 1720 (deacon); 3 March 1720 (priest) by Louis de La Vergne-Montenard de Tressan
- Consecration: 9 June 1720 (bishop) by Armand de Rohan
- Created cardinal: 16 July 1721 by Pope Innocent XIII

Personal details
- Born: 6 September 1656 Brive-la-Gaillarde, Limousin, France
- Died: 10 August 1723 (aged 66) Versailles, France
- Buried: Saint-Roch, Paris
- Profession: Clergyman, politician
- Education: Christian Doctrine Fathers

Guillaume Dubois (French: [ɡijom dybwa]; 6 September 1656 – 10 August 1723) was a French cardinal and statesman.

== Life and government ==
=== Early years ===
Dubois, the third of the four great Cardinal-Ministers (Richelieu, Mazarin, Dubois, and Fleury), was born in Brive-la-Gaillarde, in Limousin. He was, according to his enemies, the son of an apothecary, his father being in fact a doctor of medicine of a respectable family, who kept a small drug store as part of the necessary outfit of a country practitioner. He was educated at the school of the Brothers of the Christian Doctrine at Brive, where he received the tonsure at the age of thirteen. In 1672, having finished his philosophy course, he was given a scholarship at the college of St. Michel in Paris by the lieutenant-general of the Limousin. The head of the college, the abbé Antoine Faure, who was from the same part of the country as himself, befriended the lad, and continued to do so for many years after he had finished his course, finding him pupils and ultimately obtaining for him the post of tutor to the young duke of Chartres, afterwards the regent Duke of Orléans.

=== Career ===
Dubois gained the favour of Louis XIV by bringing about the marriage of his pupil with Françoise Marie de Bourbon, Mlle de Blois, a natural but legitimised daughter of the king and Madame de Montespan; and for this service he was rewarded with the gift of the abbey of St. Just in Picardy. He was present with his pupil at the Battle of Steenkerque, and "faced fire," says Marshal Luxembourg, "like a grenadier." Sent to join the French embassy in London, he made himself so active that he was recalled by the request of the ambassador, who feared his intrigues. This, however, tended to raise his credit with the king. When the Duc D'Orléans became regent (1715) Dubois, who had for some years acted as his secretary, was made councillor of state, and the chief power passed gradually into his hands.

Dubois' policy was steadily directed towards maintaining the peace of Utrecht, and this made him the main opponent of the schemes of Cardinal Alberoni for the aggrandizement of Spain. To counteract Alberoni's intrigues, he suggested an alliance with Britain and in the face of great difficulties succeeded in negotiating the Triple Alliance (1717). In 1719 he sent armies into Spain as part of the Quadruple Alliance which forced Philip V to dismiss Alberoni. Otherwise, his policy remained that of peace. Dubois' success strengthened him against the bitter opposition of a large section of the court. Dubois was instrumental during the Cellamare conspiracy of 1718.

He prayed the regent to give him the archbishopric of Cambrai, the richest in France. This demand was supported by George I and the regent yielded. Dubois aimed for the Cardinal's hat because such an ecclesiastical title would give him the utmost prominence and precedence in the Conseil d'en haut, giving him the ability to remove his political adversaries with impunity. The regent was initially reluctant: though not himself a religious man, he could hardly regard Dubois as a suitable archbishop, at a time when the ambitious Claudine Guérin de Tencin was universally believed to be his mistress. The regent called Dubois "the most rascally, atheistic, and worst priest there has ever been." He was so irreligious that it was reputed he could barely recite the Lord's Prayer when he took holy orders to assume the archbishopric of Cambrai.

In one day all the usual orders were conferred upon him, and even the great preacher Massillon consented to take part in the ceremonies. His next aim was the cardinalate, and, after long and most profitable negotiations on the part of Pope Clement XI, the red hat was given to him by Innocent XIII (1721), whose election was largely due to the bribes of Dubois. It is estimated that this cardinalate cost France about eight million francs. In the following year he was named first minister of France (August). He was soon after received at the Académie Française, and he was named President of the Assembly of Clergy.

When Louis XV attained his majority in 1723 Dubois remained chief minister. He had accumulated an immense private fortune (though nothing compared to the avaricious acquisition of wealth of Concini, Richelieu, Mazarin, Fouquet, and Colbert) possessing in addition to his see the revenues of seven abbeys. He was, however, a prey to the most terrible pains of body and agony of mind. His health was ruined by his debaucheries, and a surgical operation became necessary. This was almost immediately followed by his death, at Versailles, on 10 August 1723.

Dubois' portrait was thus drawn by his long-time rival, the Duc de St Simon (who kept a painting of him in his lavatory),

He was a little, pitiful, wizened, herringgutted man, in a flaxen wig, with a weasel's face, brightened by some intellect. All the vices - perfidy, avarice, debauchery, ambition, flattery - fought within him for the mastery. He was so consummate a liar that, when taken in the fact, he could brazenly deny it. Even his wit and knowledge of the world were spoiled, and his affected gaiety was touched with sadness, by the odour of falsehood which escaped through every pore of his body.

This famous picture is certainly biased. Dubois was unscrupulous, but so were his contemporaries, and whatever vices he had, he forged a European peace that, with the exception of small, restrained military expeditions against the Austrian Habsburgs, would last for a quarter of a century.

In 1789 appeared Vie privée du Cardinal Dubois, attributed to one of his secretaries, Mongez; and in 1815 his Mémoires secrets et correspondance inédite, edited by L de Sevelinges. See also A Chéruel, Saint-Simon et l'abbé Dubois; L Wiesener, Le Régent, l'abbé Dubois et les Anglais (1891); and memoirs of the time.

== In popular culture ==
He is played by Jean Rochefort in the 1975 movie by Bertrand Tavernier, Que la fête commence...
