= Antonio del Giudice =

Spanish nobleman and diplomat

Antonio del Giudice (1657–1733), duke of Giovinazzo, prince of Cellamare, was a Spanish nobleman and diplomat.

== Life ==
Giudice was born at Naples. In 1715, he was made Spanish ambassador to France. An instrument in the hands of Giulio Alberoni's plots, he became involved in the Cellamare Conspiracy against Philippe d'Orléans begun in Paris in 1718 - its aim was to transfer the regency of France from Philippe to Philip V of Spain, but it was discovered and Giudice was forced to leave France. References to this conspiracy are to be found in the Mémoires de la Régence, Amsterdam, 1749, and l'Histoire de la conspiration de Cellamare by Jean Vatout, 1832. He died in Seville.
