= George I of Great Britain =

King of Great Britain and Ireland from 1714 to 1727

George I
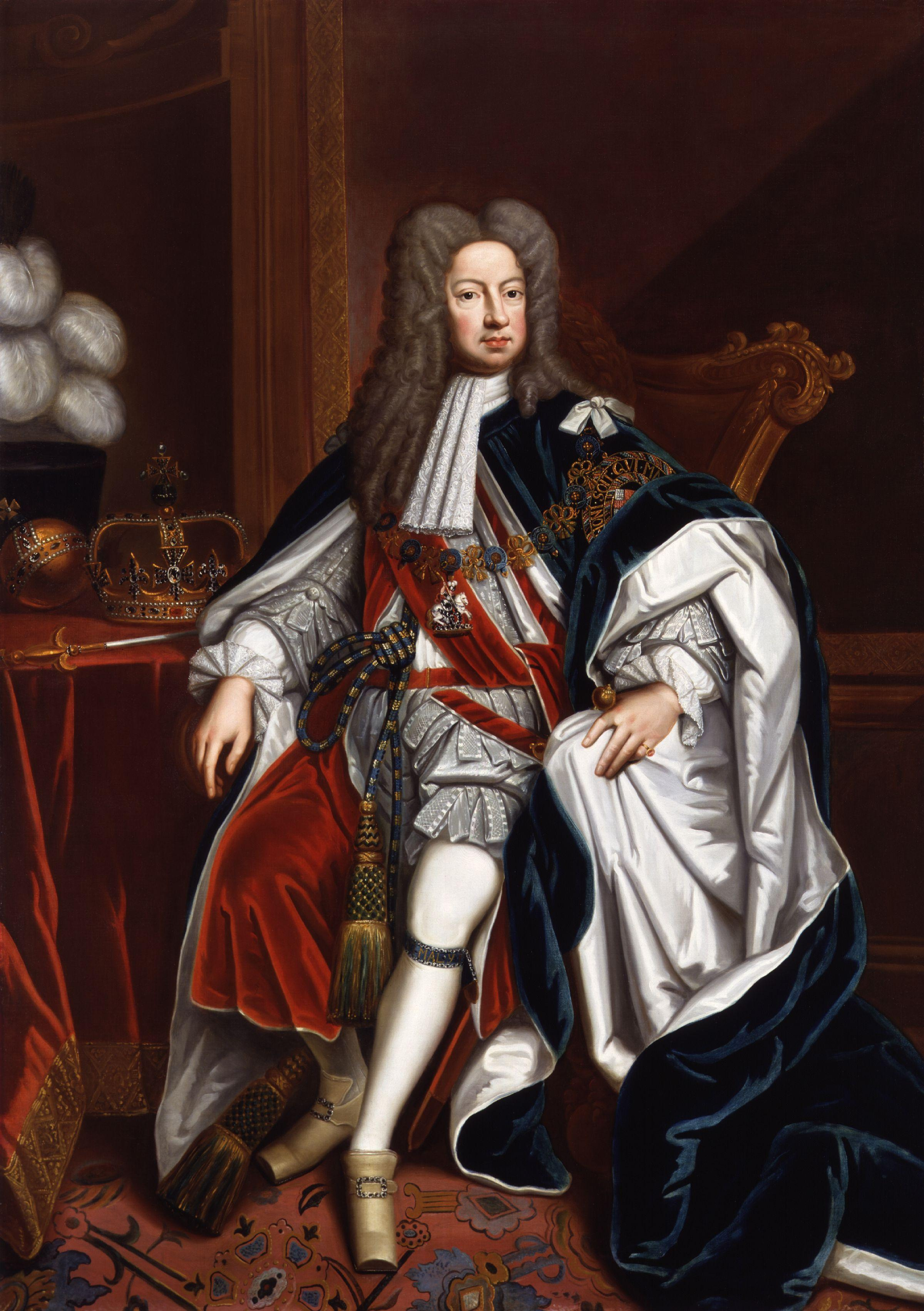
- Portrait, 1714

King of Great Britain and Ireland
- Reign: 1 August 1714 – 11 June 1727 (Note: Throughout George's life, Great Britain used the Old Style Julian calendar. Hanover adopted the New Style Gregorian calendar on 1 March 1700 (N.S.) / 19 February 1700 (O.S.). Old Style is used for dates in this article unless otherwise indicated; however, years are assumed to start from 1 January and not 25 March, which was the English New Year.)
- Coronation: 20 October 1714
- Predecessor: Anne
- Successor: George II

Elector of Hanover
- Reign: 23 January 1698 – 11 June 1727
- Predecessor: Ernest Augustus
- Successor: George II
- Born: 28 May / 7 June 1660 (O.S./N.S.); Hanover, Brunswick-Lüneburg, Holy Roman Empire
- Died: 11/22 June 1727 (aged 67) (O.S./N.S.); Schloss Osnabrück, Osnabrück, Holy Roman Empire
- Burial: 4 August 1727; Leine Palace, Hanover; later Herrenhausen, Hanover
- Spouse: Sophia Dorothea of Celle (m. 1682; div. 1694)
- Issue more...: George II of Great Britain; Sophia Dorothea, Queen in Prussia; Melusina, Countess of Walsingham (ill.)
Names
- George Louis (German: Georg Ludwig)
- House: Hanover
- Father: Ernest Augustus, Elector of Hanover
- Mother: Sophia of the Palatinate
- Religion: Protestant

George I (George Louis; German: Georg Ludwig; 28 May 1660 – 11 June 1727) was King of Great Britain and Ireland from 1 August 1714 and ruler of the Electorate of Hanover within the Holy Roman Empire from 23 January 1698 until his death in 1727. He was the first British monarch of the House of Hanover.

Born in Hanover to Ernest Augustus and Sophia of Hanover, George inherited the titles and lands of the Duchy of Brunswick-Lüneburg from his father and uncles. In 1682, he married his cousin Sophia Dorothea of Celle, with whom he had two children; he also had three daughters with his mistress Melusine von der Schulenburg. George and Sophia Dorothea divorced in 1694. A succession of European wars expanded George's German domains during his lifetime; he was ratified as prince-elector of Hanover in 1708.

As the senior Protestant descendant of his great-grandfather James VI and I, George inherited the British throne following the deaths in 1714 of his mother, Sophia, and his second cousin Anne, Queen of Great Britain. During his reign the powers of the monarchy diminished, and Britain began a transition to the modern system of cabinet government led by a prime minister. Jacobites attempted, but failed, to depose George and replace him with James Francis Edward Stuart, Anne's Catholic half-brother. Towards the end of his reign, actual political power was held by Robert Walpole, now recognised as Britain's first de facto prime minister.

George died in 1727 on a journey to his native Hanover, where he was buried. He is the most recent British monarch to be buried outside Britain. He was succeeded by his son, George II.

== Early life ==
George was born on 28 May 1660 in the city of Hanover in the Duchy of Brunswick-Lüneburg in the Holy Roman Empire. (Note: The story that George I died in the same room as that in which he was born at Osnabrück (in, for example, Le Grand Dictionnaire Historique of 1759) is contradicted by the Electress Sophia in her Memoiren der Herzogin Sophie nachmals Kurfürstin von Hannover (ed. A. Köcher, Leipzig, 1879, pp. 1 and 68) who says that her two eldest sons were born at Hanover, and by four notifications from Hanover to the court at Wolfenbüttel preserved in the Wolfenbüttel state archives.) He was the eldest son of Ernest Augustus, Duke of Brunswick-Lüneburg, and his wife, Sophia of the Palatinate. Sophia was the granddaughter of King James VI and I, through her mother, Elizabeth Stuart, Queen of Bohemia.

For the first year of his life George was the only heir to the German territories of his father and three childless uncles. George's brother, Frederick Augustus, was born in 1661, and the two boys (known respectively by the family as "Görgen" and "Gustchen") were brought up together. In 1662 the family moved to Osnabrück when Ernest Augustus was appointed ruler of the Prince-Bishopric of Osnabrück, while his older brother George William ruled in Hanover. They lived at Iburg Castle outside the city until 1673 when they moved to the newly completed Schloss Osnabrück. The parents were absent for almost a year (1664–1665) during a long convalescent holiday in Italy but Sophia corresponded regularly with her sons' governess and took a great interest in their upbringing, even more so upon her return. Sophia and Ernest Augustus had another four sons and a daughter. In her letters, Sophia describes George as a responsible, conscientious child who set an example to his younger brothers and sisters.

By 1675, George's eldest uncle had died without issue, but his remaining two uncles had married, putting George's inheritance in jeopardy, for his uncles' estates might pass to their own sons, were they to have any, instead of to George. George's father took him hunting and riding and introduced him to military matters; mindful of his uncertain future, Ernest Augustus took the fifteen-year-old George on campaign in the Franco-Dutch War, with the deliberate purpose of testing and training his son in battle.

In 1679 another uncle died unexpectedly without sons, and Ernest Augustus became reigning Duke of Calenberg-Göttingen, with his capital at Hanover. George's surviving uncle, George William, had married his mistress in order to legitimise his only daughter, Sophia Dorothea of Celle, but looked unlikely to have any further children. Under Salic law, inheritance of territory was restricted to the male line, so the succession of George and his brothers to the territories of their father and uncle now seemed secure. In 1682 the family agreed to adopt the principle of primogeniture, meaning George would inherit all the territory and not have to share it with his brothers.

== Marriage ==
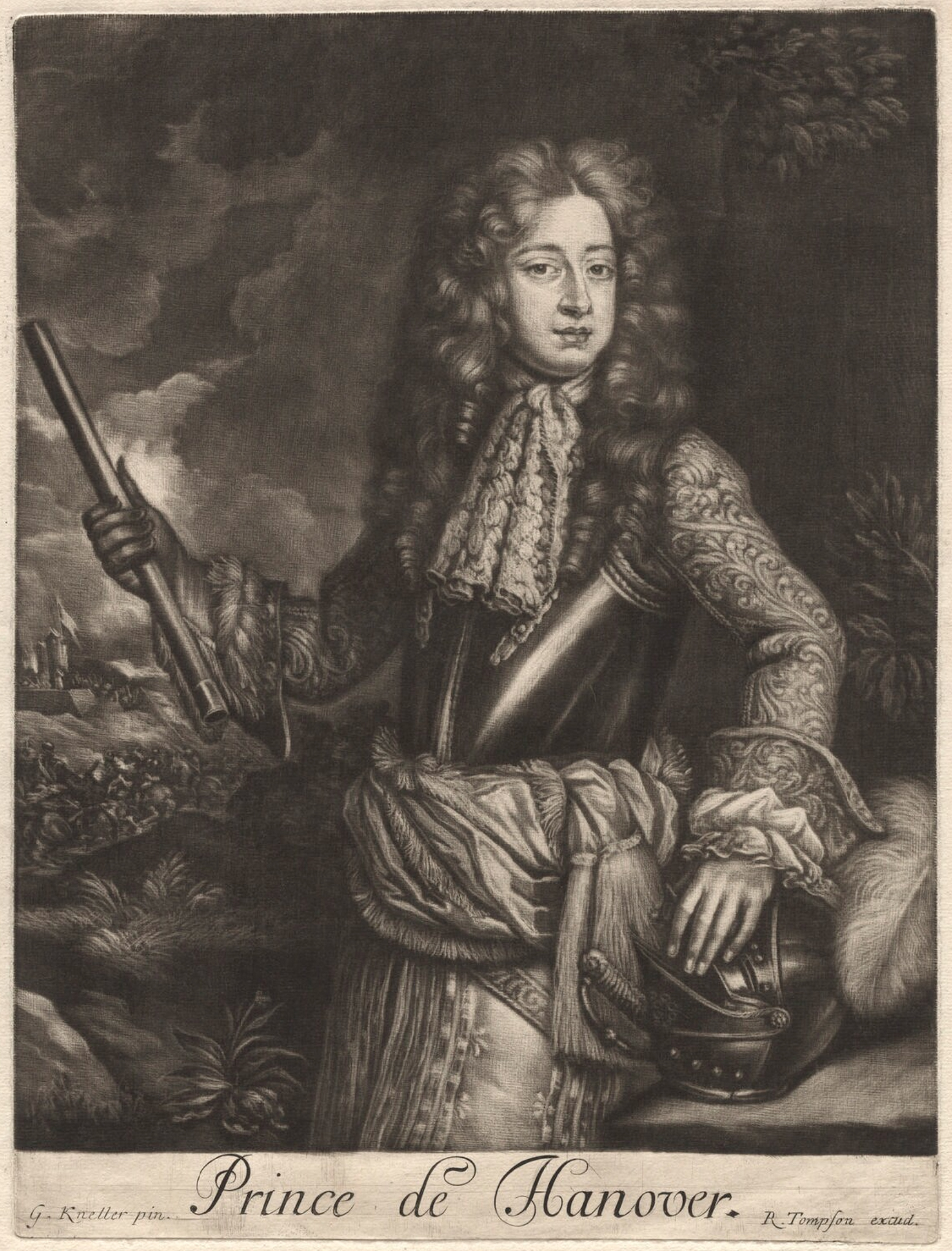
George in 1680, aged 20, when he was Prince of Hanover. After a painting by Godfrey Kneller.

In 1682, George married Sophia Dorothea, the daughter of his uncle George William, thereby securing additional incomes that would have been outside Salic laws. This marriage of state was arranged primarily to ensure a healthy annual income, and assisted the eventual unification of Hanover and Celle. His mother at first opposed the marriage, because she looked down on Sophia Dorothea's mother, Eleonore (who came from the lower French nobility), and because she was concerned by Sophia Dorothea's legitimated status. She was eventually won over by the advantages inherent in the marriage.

In 1683, George and his brother Frederick Augustus served in the Great Turkish War at the Battle of Vienna, and Sophia Dorothea bore George a son, George Augustus. The following year, Frederick Augustus was informed of the adoption of primogeniture, meaning he would no longer receive part of his father's territory, as he had until then expected. This led to a breach between Frederick Augustus and his father, and between the brothers, that lasted until his death in battle in 1690. With the imminent formation of a single Hanoverian state, and the Hanoverians' continuing contributions to the Empire's wars, Ernest Augustus was made a prince-elector of the Holy Roman Empire in 1692, pending confirmation by the Imperial Diet. George's prospects were now better than ever as the sole heir to his father's electorate and his uncle's duchy.

Sophia Dorothea had a second child, a daughter named after her, in 1687, but there were no other pregnancies. The couple became estranged—George preferred the company of his mistress, Melusine von der Schulenburg, and Sophia Dorothea had her own romance, with the Swedish Count Philip Christoph von Königsmarck. Threatened with the scandal of an elopement, the Hanoverian court, including George's brothers and mother, urged the lovers to desist, but to no avail. According to diplomatic sources from Hanover's enemies, in July 1694, the Swedish count was killed, possibly with George's connivance, and his body thrown into the river Leine weighted with stones. The murder was claimed to have been committed by four of Ernest Augustus's courtiers, one of whom, Don Nicolò Montalbano, was paid the enormous sum of 150,000 thalers, about one hundred times the annual salary of the highest-paid minister. Later rumours supposed that Königsmarck was hacked to pieces and buried beneath the Hanover palace floorboards. However, sources in Hanover itself, including Sophia, denied any knowledge of Königsmarck's whereabouts.

George's marriage to Sophia Dorothea was dissolved, not on the grounds that either of them had committed adultery, but on the grounds that Sophia Dorothea had abandoned her husband. With her father's agreement, George had Sophia Dorothea imprisoned in Ahlden House in her native Celle, where she stayed until she died more than thirty years later. She was denied access to her children and father, forbidden to remarry and only allowed to walk unaccompanied within the mansion courtyard. She was, however, endowed with an income, establishment, and servants, granted access to her mother and allowed to ride in a carriage outside her castle under supervision. Melusine von der Schulenburg acted as George's hostess openly from 1698 until his death, and they had three daughters together, born in 1692, 1693 and 1701.

== Electoral reign ==
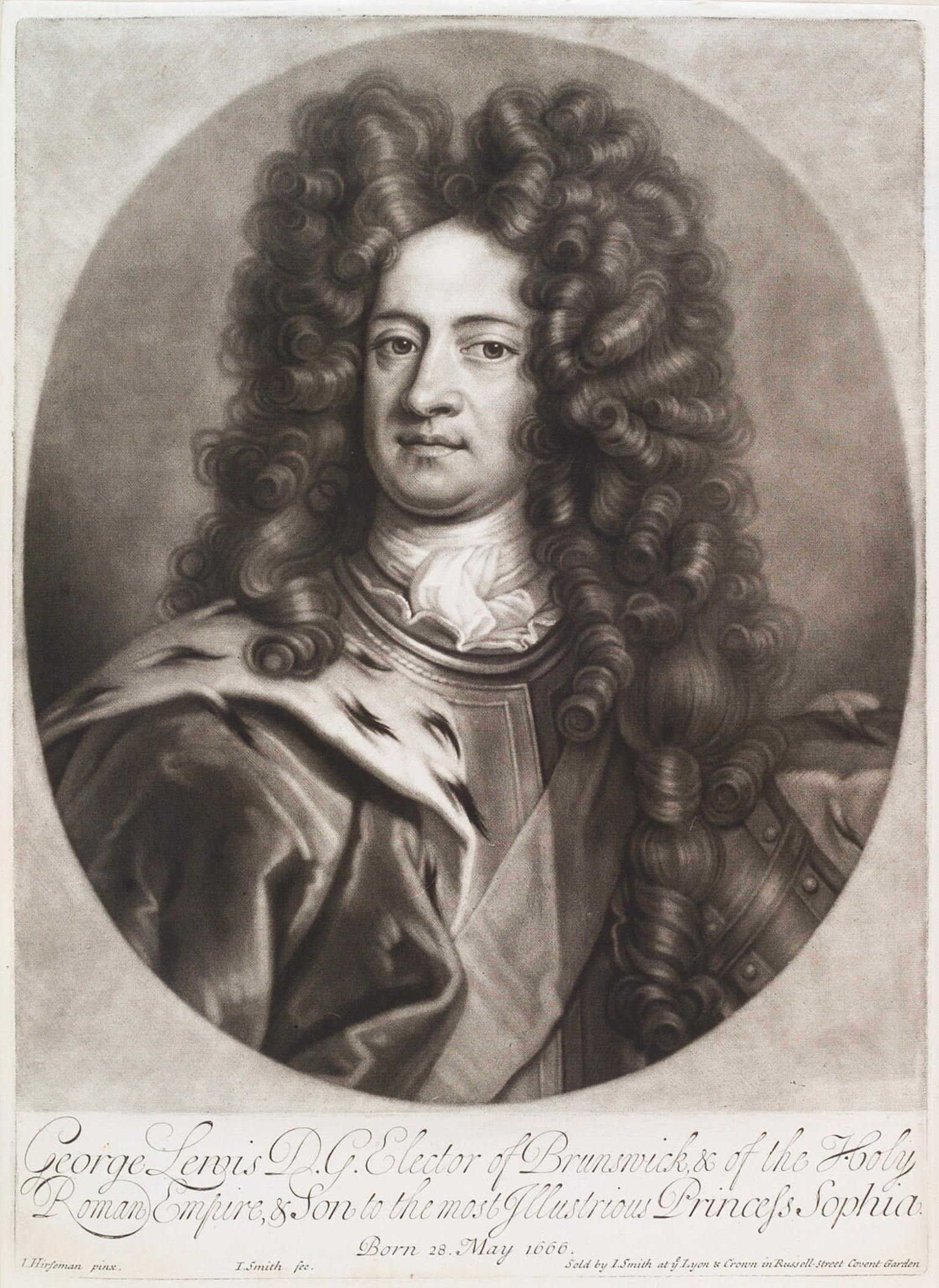
George in 1706, when he was Elector of Hanover. After Johann Leonhard Hirschmann.

Ernest Augustus died on 23 January 1698, leaving all of his territories to George with the exception of the Prince-Bishopric of Osnabrück, an office he had held since 1661. (Note: The Prince-Bishopric was not an hereditary title; instead it alternated between Protestant and Roman Catholic incumbents.) George thus became Duke of Brunswick-Lüneburg (also known as Hanover, after its capital) as well as Archbannerbearer and a prince-elector of the Holy Roman Empire. His court in Hanover was graced by many cultural icons such as the mathematician and philosopher Gottfried Leibniz and the composers George Frideric Händel and Agostino Steffani.

Shortly after George's accession to his paternal duchy, Prince William, Duke of Gloucester, who was second-in-line to the English and Scottish thrones, died. By the terms of the English Act of Settlement 1701, George's mother, Sophia, was designated as the heir to the English throne if the then reigning monarch, William III, and his sister-in-law, Anne, died without surviving issue. The succession was so designed because Sophia was the closest Protestant relative of the British royal family. Fifty-six Catholics with superior hereditary claims were bypassed. The likelihood of any of them converting to Protestantism for the sake of the succession was remote; some had already refused.

In August 1701, George was invested with the Order of the Garter and, within six weeks, the nearest Catholic claimant to the thrones, the former king James II, died. William III died the following March and was succeeded by Anne. Sophia became heiress presumptive to the new Queen of England. Sophia was in her seventy-first year, thirty-five years older than Anne, but she was very fit and healthy and invested time and energy in securing the succession either for herself or for her son. However, it was George who understood the complexities of English politics and constitutional law, which required further acts in 1705 to naturalise Sophia and her heirs as English subjects, and to detail arrangements for the transfer of power through a regency council. In the same year, George's surviving uncle died and he inherited further German dominions: the Principality of Lüneburg-Grubenhagen, centred at Celle.

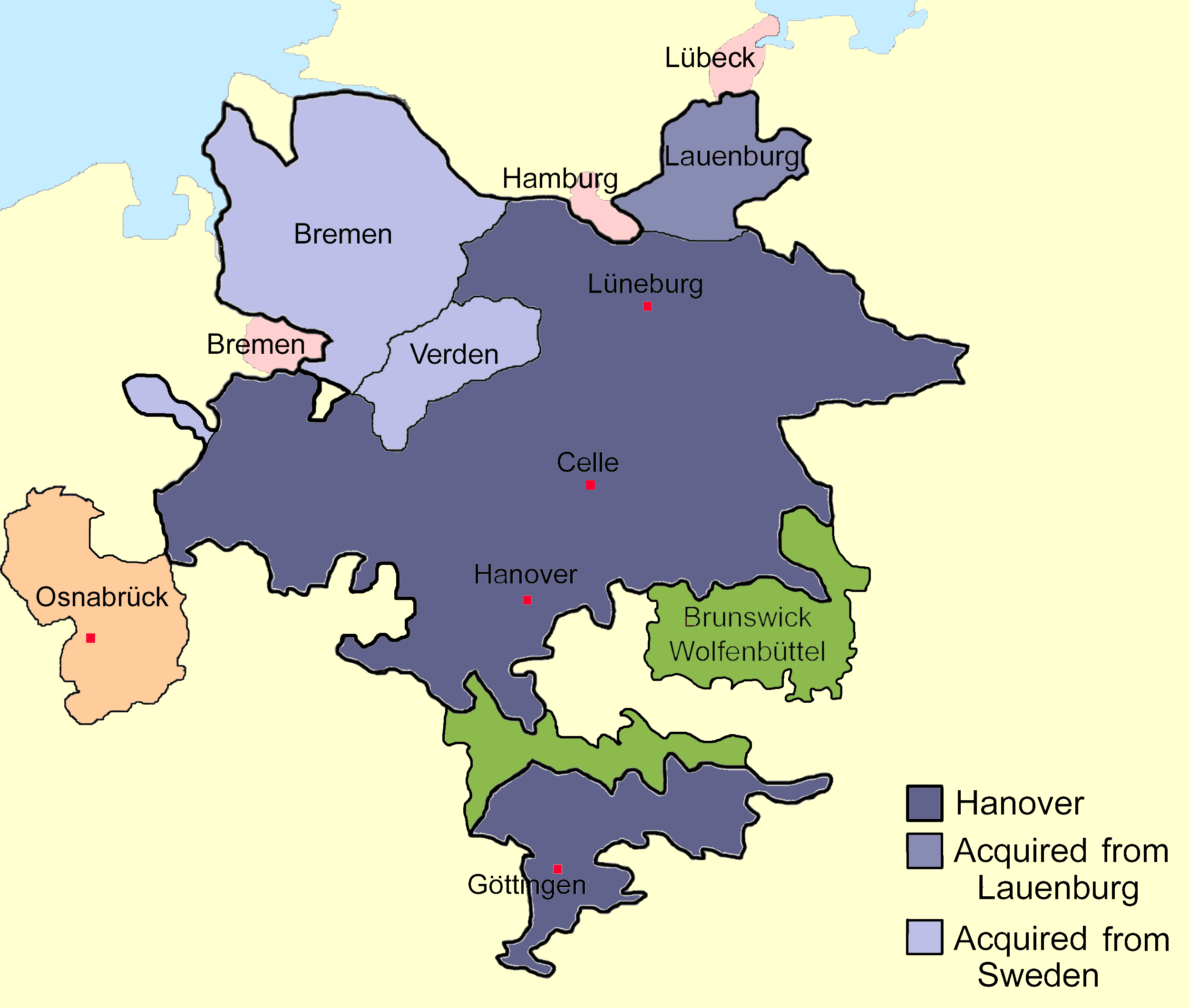
Sketch map of Hanover, c. 1720, showing the relative locations of Hanover, Brunswick-Wolfenbüttel, and the Prince-Bishopric of Osnabrück. During George's lifetime Hanover acquired Lauenburg and Bremen-Verden.

Shortly after George's accession in Hanover, the War of the Spanish Succession (1701–1714) broke out. At issue was the right of Philip, the grandson of King Louis XIV of France, to succeed to the Spanish throne under the terms of King Charles II's will. The Holy Roman Empire, the United Dutch Provinces, England, Hanover and many other German states opposed Philip's right to succeed because they feared that the French House of Bourbon would become too powerful if it also controlled Spain. As part of the war effort, George invaded his neighbouring state, Brunswick-Wolfenbüttel, which was pro-French, writing out some of the battle orders himself. The invasion succeeded with few lives lost. As a reward, the prior Hanoverian annexation of the Duchy of Saxe-Lauenburg by George's uncle was recognised by the British and Dutch.

In 1706, Elector Maximilian II Emanuel of Bavaria was deprived of his offices and titles for siding with Louis against the Empire. The following year, George was invested as an Imperial Field Marshal with command of the Imperial army stationed along the Rhine. His tenure was not altogether successful, partly because he was deceived by his ally, John Churchill, 1st Duke of Marlborough, into a diversionary attack, and partly because Emperor Joseph I appropriated the funds necessary for George's campaign for his own use. Despite this, the German princes thought he had acquitted himself well. In 1708, they formally confirmed George's position as a prince-elector in recognition of, or because of, his service. George did not hold Marlborough's actions against him; he understood they were part of a plan to lure French forces away from the main attack.

In 1709, George resigned as field marshal, never to go on active service again. In 1710, he was granted the dignity of Arch-Treasurer of the Empire, an office formerly held by the Elector Palatine; the absence of the Elector of Bavaria allowed a reshuffling of offices. The Emperor's death in 1711 threatened to destroy the balance of power in the opposite direction, so the war ended in 1713 with the ratification of the Treaty of Utrecht. Philip was allowed to succeed to the Spanish throne but removed from the French line of succession, and the Elector of Bavaria was restored.

== Accession in Great Britain and Ireland ==
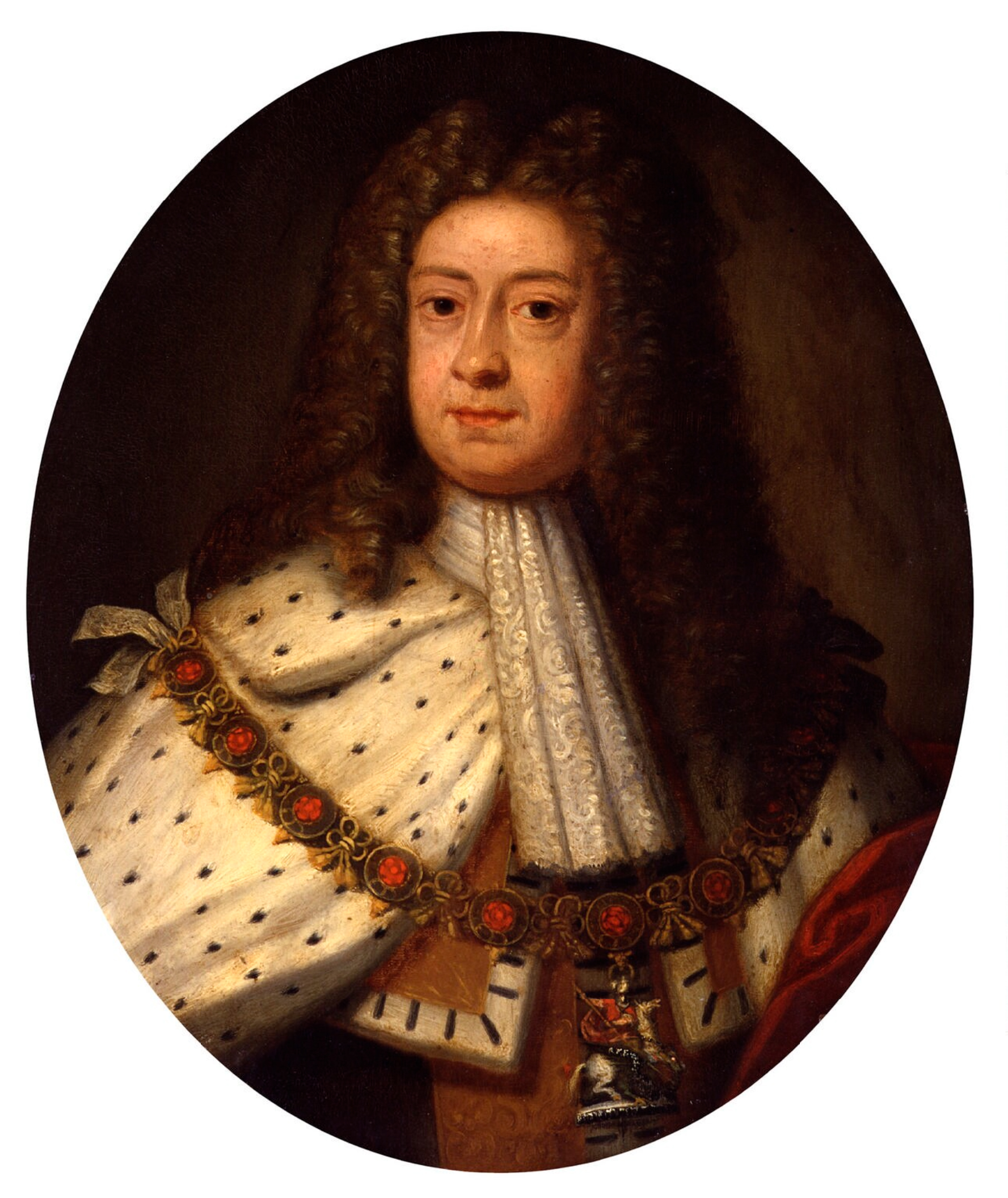
George c. 1714, the year of his succession, as painted by Godfrey Kneller

Though both England and Scotland recognised Anne as their queen, only the Parliament of England had settled on Sophia, Electress of Hanover, as the heir presumptive. The Parliament of Scotland (the Estates) had not formally settled the succession question for the Scottish throne. In 1703, the Estates passed a bill declaring that their selection for Queen Anne's successor would not be the same individual as the successor to the English throne, unless England granted full freedom of trade to Scottish merchants in England and its colonies. At first Royal Assent was withheld, but the following year Anne capitulated to the wishes of the Estates and assent was granted to the bill, which became the Act of Security 1704. In response the English Parliament passed the Alien Act 1705, which threatened to restrict Anglo-Scottish trade and cripple the Scottish economy if the Estates did not agree to the Hanoverian succession. Eventually, in 1707, both Parliaments agreed on a Treaty of Union, which united England and Scotland into a single political entity, the Kingdom of Great Britain, and established the rules of succession as laid down by the Act of Settlement 1701. The union created the largest free trade area in 18th-century Europe.

Whig politicians believed Parliament had the right to determine the succession, and to bestow it on the nearest Protestant relative of the Queen, while many Tories were more inclined to believe in the hereditary right of the Catholic Stuarts, who were nearer relations. In 1710, George announced that he would succeed in Britain by hereditary right, as the right had been removed from the Stuarts, and he retained it. "This declaration was meant to scotch any Whig interpretation that parliament had given him the kingdom [and] ... convince the Tories that he was no usurper."

George's mother, the Electress Sophia, died on 28 May 1714 (Note: 8 June in the New Style Gregorian calendar adopted by Hanover in 1700.) at the age of 83. She had collapsed in the gardens at Herrenhausen after rushing to shelter from a shower of rain. George was now Queen Anne's heir presumptive. He swiftly revised the membership of the regency council that would take power after Anne's death, as it was known that Anne's health was failing and politicians in Britain were jostling for power. She suffered a stroke, which left her unable to speak, and died on 1 August 1714. The list of regents was opened, the members sworn in, and George was proclaimed King of Great Britain and King of Ireland. Partly due to contrary winds, which kept him in The Hague awaiting passage, he did not arrive in Britain until 18 September. George was crowned at Westminster Abbey on 20 October. His coronation was accompanied by rioting in over twenty towns in England.

George mainly lived in Great Britain after 1714, though he visited his home in Hanover in 1716, 1719, 1720, 1723 and 1725. In total, George spent about one fifth of his reign as king in Germany. A clause in the Act of Settlement that forbade the British monarch from leaving the country without Parliament's permission was unanimously repealed in 1716. During all but the first of the King's absences, power was vested in a regency council rather than in his son, George Augustus, Prince of Wales.

== Wars and rebellions ==
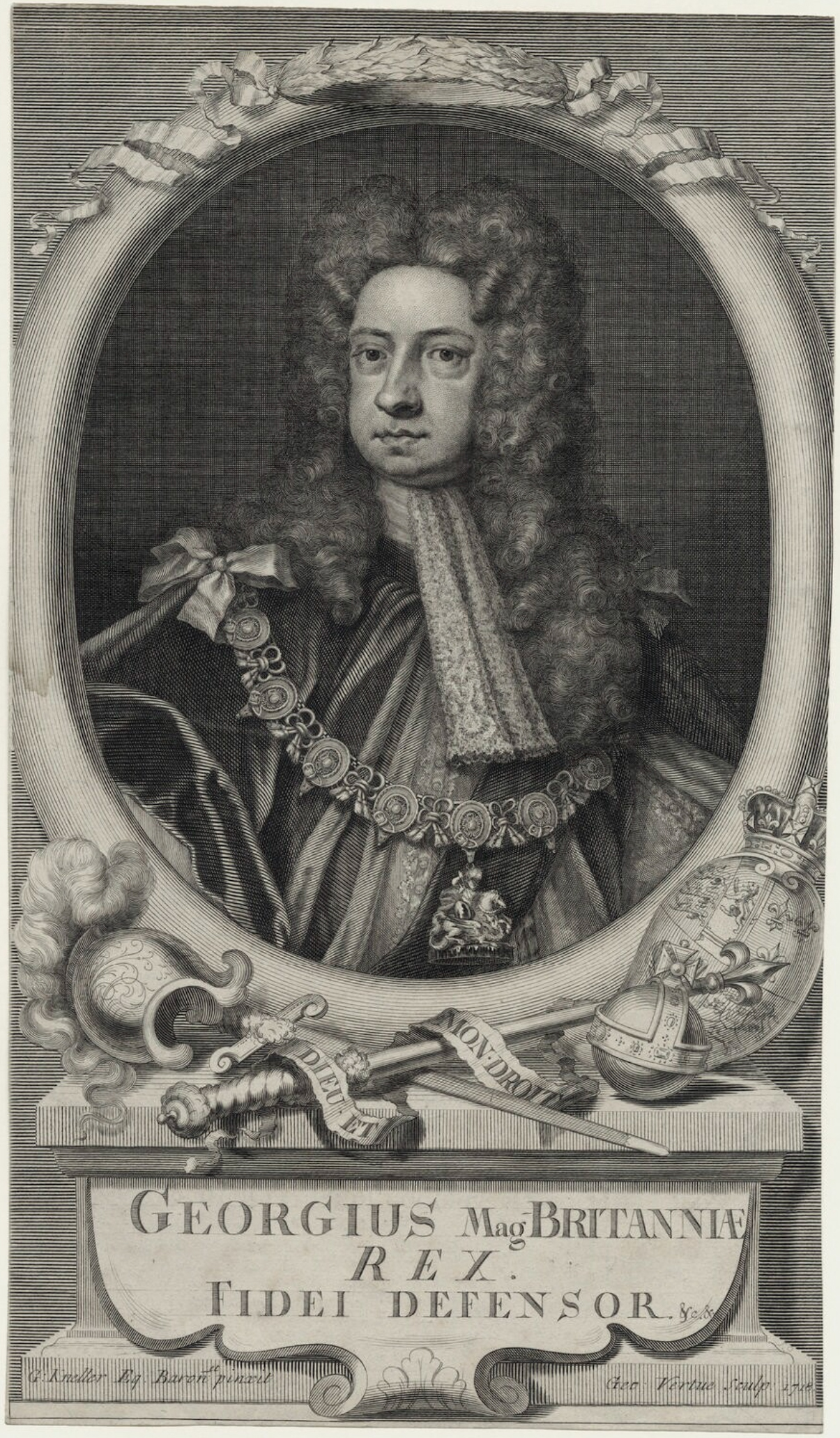
George in 1718, by George Vertue, after Godfrey Kneller

Within a year of George's accession the Whigs won an overwhelming victory in the general election of 1715. Several members of the defeated Tory Party sympathised with the Jacobites, who sought to replace George with Anne's Catholic half-brother, James Francis Edward Stuart (called "James III and VIII" by his supporters and "the Pretender" by his opponents). Some disgruntled Tories sided with a Jacobite rebellion, which became known as "The Fifteen". James's supporters, led by John Erskine, Earl of Mar, a Scottish nobleman who had previously served as a secretary of state, instigated rebellion in Scotland where support for Jacobitism was stronger than in England. "The Fifteen", however, was a dismal failure; Lord Mar's battle plans were poor, and James arrived late with too little money and too few arms. By the end of the year the rebellion had all but collapsed. In February 1716, facing defeat, James and Lord Mar fled to France. After the rebellion was defeated, although there were some executions and forfeitures, George acted to moderate the Government's response, showed leniency, and spent the income from the forfeited estates on schools for Scotland and paying off part of the national debt.

George's distrust of the Tories aided the passing of power to the Whigs. Whig dominance grew to be so great under George that the Tories did not return to power for another half-century. After the election, the Whig-dominated Parliament passed the Septennial Act 1715, which extended the maximum duration of Parliament to seven years (although it could be dissolved earlier by the Sovereign). Thus Whigs already in power could remain in such a position for a greater period of time.

After his accession in Great Britain, George's relationship with his son (which had always been poor) worsened. Prince George Augustus encouraged opposition to his father's policies, including measures designed to increase religious freedom in Britain and expand Hanover's German territories at Sweden's expense. In 1717, the birth of a grandson led to a major quarrel between George and the Prince of Wales. The King, supposedly following custom, appointed the Lord Chamberlain (Thomas Pelham-Holles, 1st Duke of Newcastle) as one of the baptismal sponsors of the child. The King was angered when the Prince of Wales, disliking Newcastle, verbally insulted the Duke at the christening, which the Duke misunderstood as a challenge to a duel. The Prince was told to leave the royal residence, St. James's Palace. The Prince's new home, Leicester House, became a meeting place for the King's political opponents. The King and his son were later reconciled at the insistence of Robert Walpole and the desire of the Princess of Wales, who had moved out with her husband but missed her children, who had been left in the King's care. Nevertheless, father and son were never again on cordial terms.

George was active in directing British foreign policy during his early reign. In 1717, he contributed to the creation of the Triple Alliance, an anti-Spanish league composed of Great Britain, France and the Dutch Republic. In 1718, Austria was added to the body, which became known as the Quadruple Alliance. The subsequent War of the Quadruple Alliance involved the same issue as the War of the Spanish Succession. The 1713 Treaty of Utrecht had recognised the grandson of Louis XIV of France, Philip V, as king of Spain on the condition that he gave up his rights to succeed to the French throne. But upon Louis XIV's 1715 death, Philip sought to overturn the treaty.

Spain supported a Jacobite-led invasion of Scotland in 1719, but stormy seas allowed only about three hundred Spanish troops to reach Scotland. A base was established at Eilean Donan Castle on the west Scottish coast in April, only to be destroyed by British ships a month later. Jacobite attempts to recruit Scottish clansmen yielded a fighting force of only about a thousand men. The Jacobites were poorly equipped and were easily defeated by British artillery at the Battle of Glen Shiel. The clansmen dispersed into the Highlands, and the Spaniards surrendered. The invasion never posed any serious threat to George's government. With the French now fighting against him, Philip's armies fared poorly. As a result, the Spanish and French thrones remained separate. Simultaneously, Hanover gained from the resolution of the Great Northern War, which had been caused by rivalry between Sweden and Russia for control of the Baltic. The Swedish territories of Bremen-Verden were ceded to Hanover in 1719, with Hanover paying Sweden monetary compensation for the loss of territory.

== Ministries ==
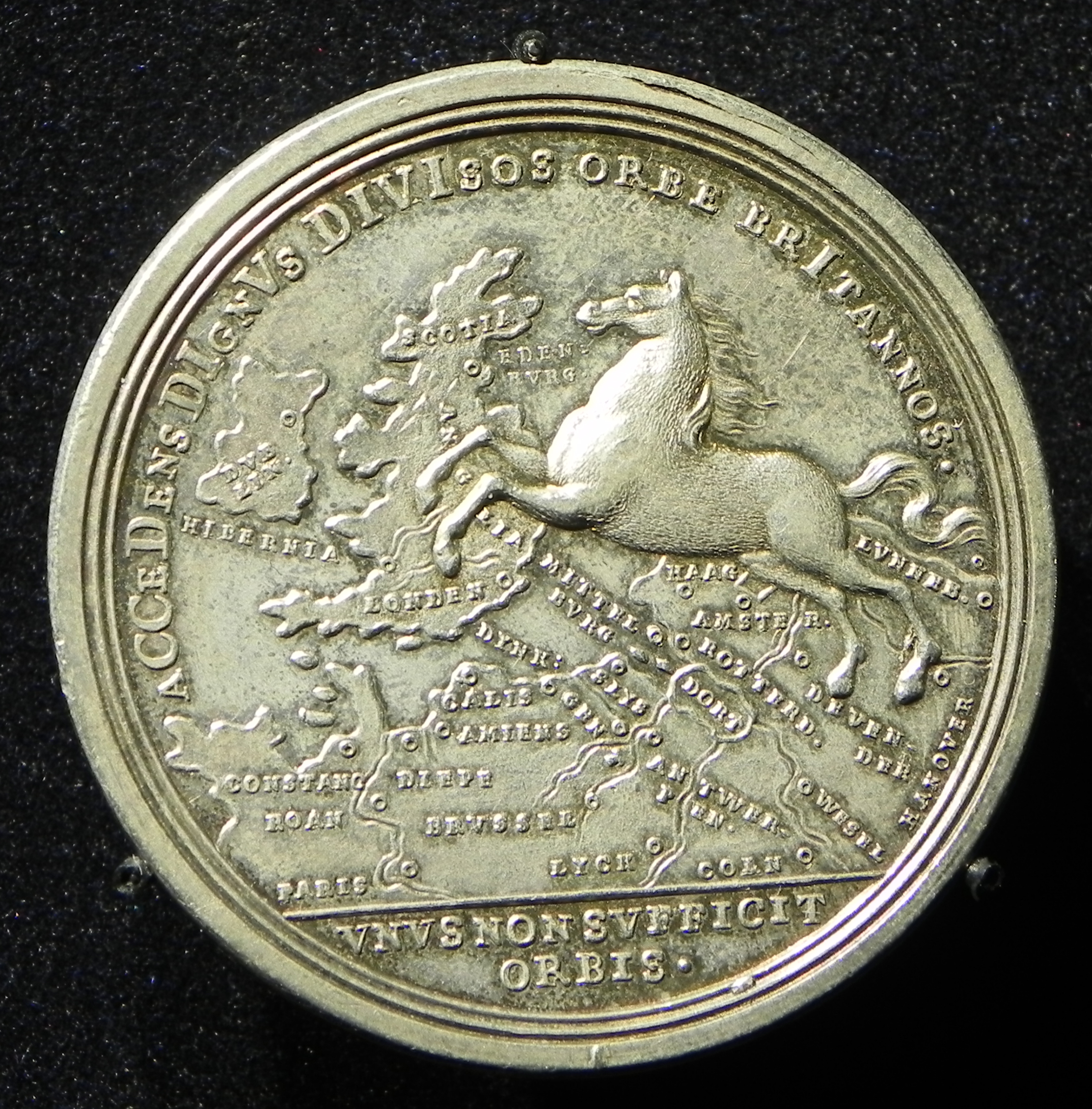
A 1714 silver medallion from the reign of George I, referring to his accession in Great Britain. The Saxon Steed runs from Hanover to Britain.

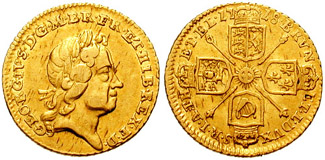
A 1718 quarter-guinea coin from the reign of George I, showing him in profile

In Hanover, George was an absolute monarch, albeit within the laws of the Holy Roman Empire. All government expenditure above 50 thalers (between 12 and 13 British pounds), and the appointment of all army officers, all ministers, and even government officials above the level of copyist, was in his personal control. By contrast in Great Britain, George had to govern through Parliament.

In 1715 when the Whigs came to power, George's chief ministers included Robert Walpole, Lord Townshend (Walpole's brother-in-law), Lord Stanhope and Lord Sunderland. In 1717 Townshend was dismissed, and Walpole resigned from the Cabinet over disagreements with their colleagues; Stanhope became supreme in foreign affairs, and Sunderland the same in domestic matters.

Lord Sunderland's power began to wane in 1719. He introduced a Peerage Bill that attempted to limit the size of the House of Lords by restricting new creations. The measure would have solidified Sunderland's control of the House by preventing the creation of opposition peers, but it was defeated after Walpole led the opposition to the bill by delivering what was considered "the most brilliant speech of his career". Walpole and Townshend were reappointed as ministers the following year and a new, supposedly unified, Whig government formed.

Greater problems arose over financial speculation and the management of the national debt. Certain government bonds could not be redeemed without the consent of the bondholder and had been issued when interest rates were high; consequently each bond represented a long-term drain on public finances, as bonds were hardly ever redeemed. In 1719, the South Sea Company proposed to take over £31 million (three fifths) of the British national debt by exchanging government securities for stock in the company. The Company bribed Lord Sunderland, George's mistress Melusine von der Schulenburg, Duchess of Kendal, and Lord Stanhope's cousin, Secretary of the Treasury Charles Stanhope, to support their plan. The Company enticed bondholders to convert their high-interest, irredeemable bonds to low-interest, easily tradeable stocks by offering apparently preferential financial gains. Company prices rose rapidly; the shares had cost £128 on 1 January 1720, but were valued at £500 when the conversion scheme opened in May. On 24 June the price reached a peak of £1,050. The company's success led to the speculative flotation of other companies, some of a bogus nature, and the Government, in an attempt to suppress these schemes and with the support of the company, passed the Bubble Act. With the rise in the market now halted, uncontrolled selling began in August, which caused the stock to plummet to £150 by the end of September. Many individuals—including aristocrats—lost vast sums and some were completely ruined. George, who had been in Hanover since June, returned to London in November—sooner than he wanted or was usual—at the request of the ministry.

The economic crisis, known as the South Sea Bubble, made George and his ministers extremely unpopular. In 1721, Lord Stanhope, though personally innocent, collapsed and died after a stressful debate in the House of Lords, and Lord Sunderland resigned from public office.

Sunderland, however, retained a degree of personal influence with George until his sudden death in 1722 allowed the rise of Robert Walpole. Walpole became de facto Prime Minister, although the title was not formally applied to him (officially, he was First Lord of the Treasury and Chancellor of the Exchequer). His management of the South Sea crisis, by rescheduling the debts and arranging some compensation, helped the return to financial stability. Through Walpole's skilful management of Parliament, George managed to avoid direct implication in the company's fraudulent actions. Claims that George had received free stock as a bribe are not supported by evidence; indeed receipts in the Royal Archives show that he paid for his subscriptions and that he lost money in the crash.

== Later years and death ==
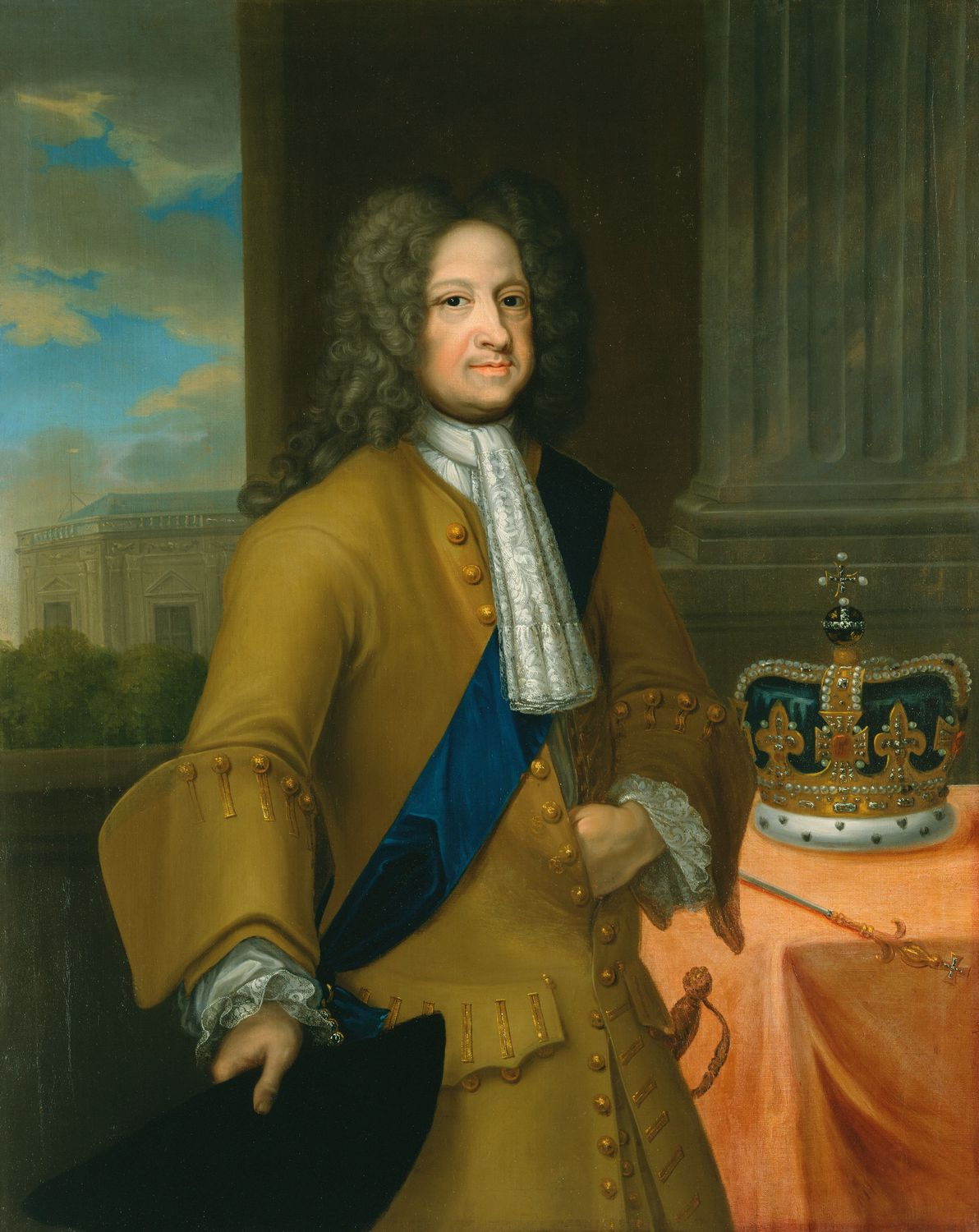
1720s portrait of George by Georg Wilhelm Lafontaine

As requested by Walpole, George revived the Order of the Bath in 1725, which enabled Walpole to reward or gain political supporters by offering them the honour. Walpole became extremely powerful and was largely able to appoint ministers of his own choosing. Unlike his predecessor, Queen Anne, George rarely attended meetings of the cabinet; most of his communications were in private, and he only exercised substantial influence with respect to British foreign policy. With the aid of Lord Townshend, he arranged for the ratification by Great Britain, France and Prussia of the Treaty of Hanover, which was designed to counterbalance the Austro-Spanish Treaty of Vienna and protect British trade.

George, although increasingly reliant on Walpole, could still have replaced his ministers at will. Walpole was afraid of being removed from office towards the end of George I's reign, but such fears were put to an end when George died during his sixth trip to his native Hanover since his accession as king. He suffered a stroke on the road between Delden and Nordhorn on 9 June 1727, and was taken by carriage about 55 miles to the east, to the palace of his younger brother, Ernest Augustus, Prince-Bishop of Osnabrück, where he died two days after arrival in the early hours before dawn on 11 June 1727, aged 67. (Note: 22 June in the New Style Gregorian calendar adopted by Hanover in 1700.) George I was buried in the chapel of Leine Palace in Hanover, but his remains were moved to the chapel at Herrenhausen Gardens after World War II. Leine Palace was entirely burnt out as a result of Allied air raids and the King's remains, along with his parents', were moved to the 19th-century mausoleum of King Ernest Augustus in the Berggarten.

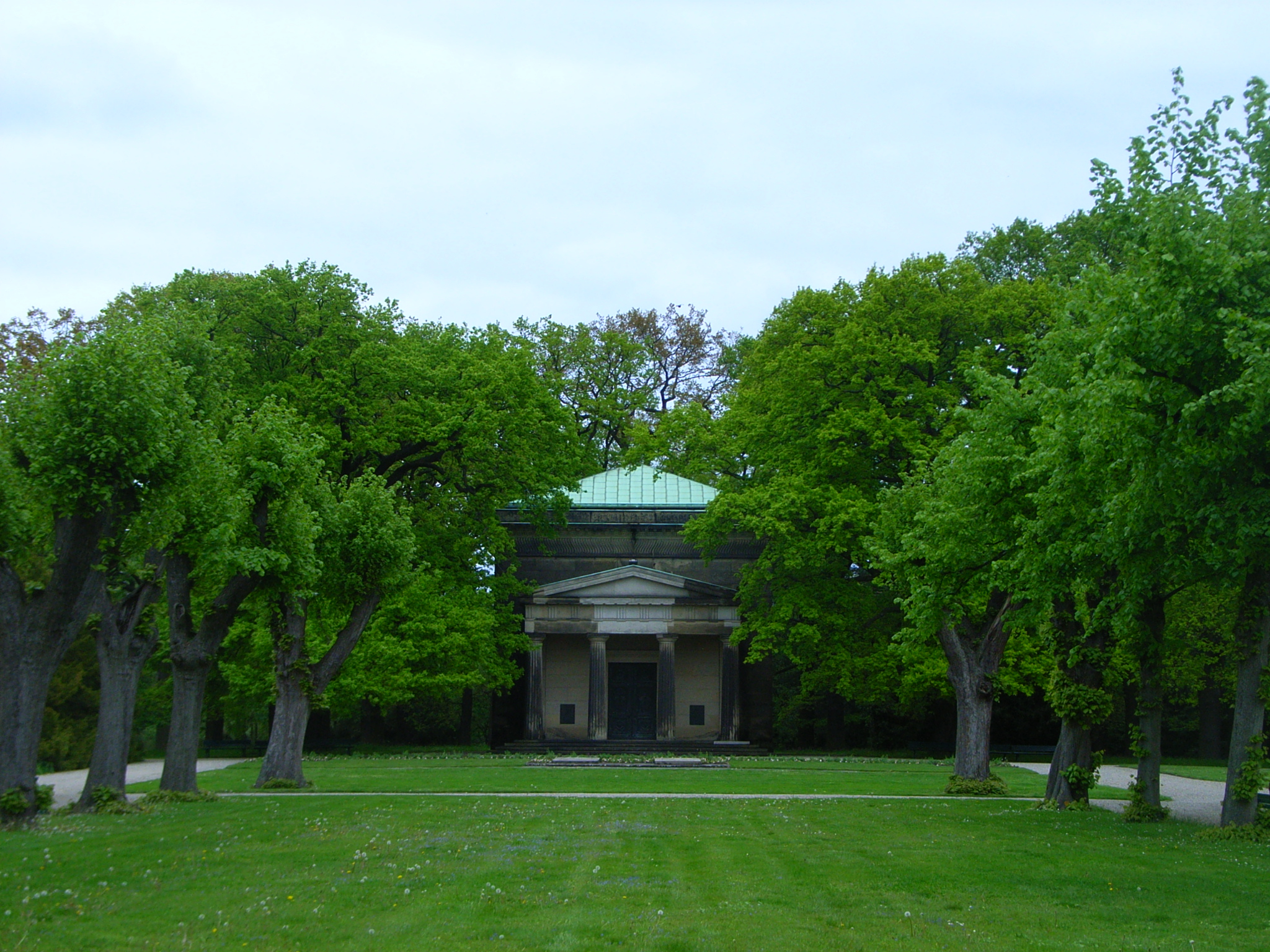
Mausoleum of King Ernest Augustus in the Berggarten of Herrenhausen Gardens

George was succeeded by his son, George Augustus, who took the throne as George II. It was widely assumed, even by Walpole for a time, that George II planned to remove Walpole from office but was dissuaded from doing so by his wife, Caroline of Ansbach. However, Walpole commanded a substantial majority in Parliament and George II had little choice but to retain him or risk ministerial instability.

== Evaluations and legacy ==
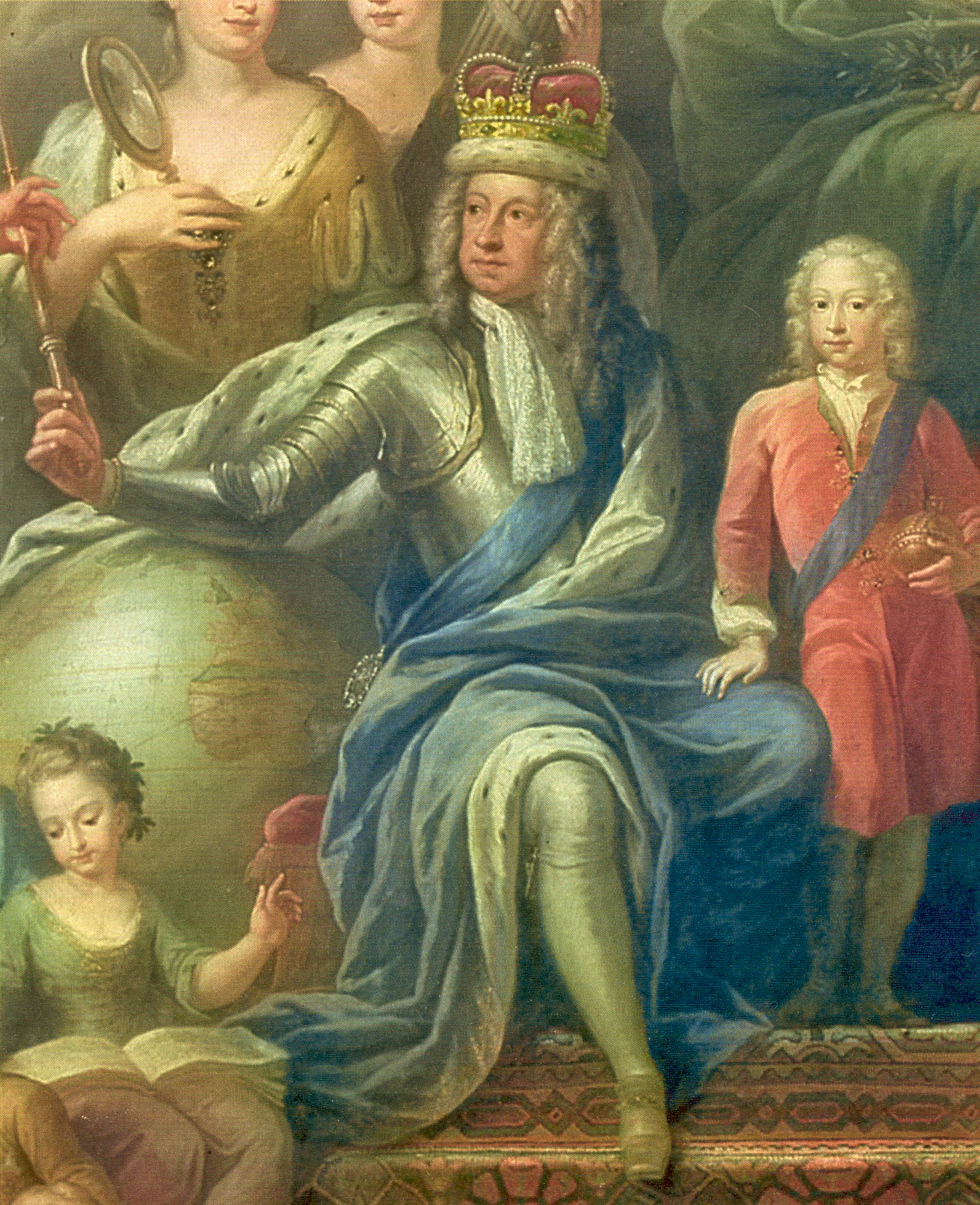
George surrounded by his family, in a painting by James Thornhill

George I's accession secured the Protestant succession and prevented a Catholic restoration under the "Old Pretender" (James Stuart). The result was constitutional continuity after the turbulent Stuart period. The king's limited knowledge of the English language and disinterest in day-to-day British affairs left a vacuum that was filled by the rise of modern parliamentary democracy. This enabled Robert Walpole to seize the initiative and emerge as Britain's first de facto Prime Minister; his new style of cabinet governance filled the royal vacuum. The British economy tripled in size in the 18th century and prosperity marked George's reign. There was continued expansion of trade and commerce, building on the financial innovations of the previous decades. The South Sea Bubble of 1720 was a brief setback but it also led to improved financial regulation. The consolidation of Whig party dominance brought political stability and supported policies favouring commercial interests and religious toleration for Protestant dissenters.

However, the king was widely disliked by the common English public as a foreigner who was more interested with politics in Hanover than in Britain. This fuelled dissent and strengthened Jacobite plans to overthrow the Hanoverians. Corruption was widespread, as exemplified by the South Sea Bubble scandal that financially ruined many investors—the king himself lost heavily in it as did Walpole. The king's bitter relationship with his son (the future George II) created political factions and instability at court, weakening the monarchy's prestige. George was openly ridiculed by his British subjects who thought him unintelligent and wooden. His treatment of his wife, Sophia Dorothea, became something of a scandal. His Lutheran faith, his overseeing both the Lutheran churches in Hanover and the Church of England, and the presence of Lutheran preachers in his court caused some consternation among his Anglican subjects.

The British distrusted George as too German, and spread false rumours about supposed German mistresses. However, in mainland Europe, he was seen as a progressive ruler supportive of the Enlightenment who permitted his critics to publish without risk of severe censorship, and provided sanctuary to Voltaire when the philosopher was exiled from Paris in 1726. European and British sources agree that George was reserved, temperate and financially prudent; he disliked being in the public light at social events, avoided the royal box at the opera and often travelled incognito to the homes of friends to play cards. Despite some unpopularity, the Protestant George I was seen by most of his subjects and Parliament as a better alternative to the Catholic pretender James. William Makepeace Thackeray indicates such ambivalent feelings as he wrote:

His heart was in Hanover ... He was more than fifty years of age when he came amongst us: we took him because we wanted him, because he served our turn; we laughed at his uncouth German ways, and sneered at him. He took our loyalty for what it was worth; laid hands on what money he could; kept us assuredly from Popery ... I, for one, would have been on his side in those days. Cynical and selfish, as he was, he was better than a king out of St. Germains [James, the Stuart Pretender] with the French king's orders in his pocket, and a swarm of Jesuits in his train.

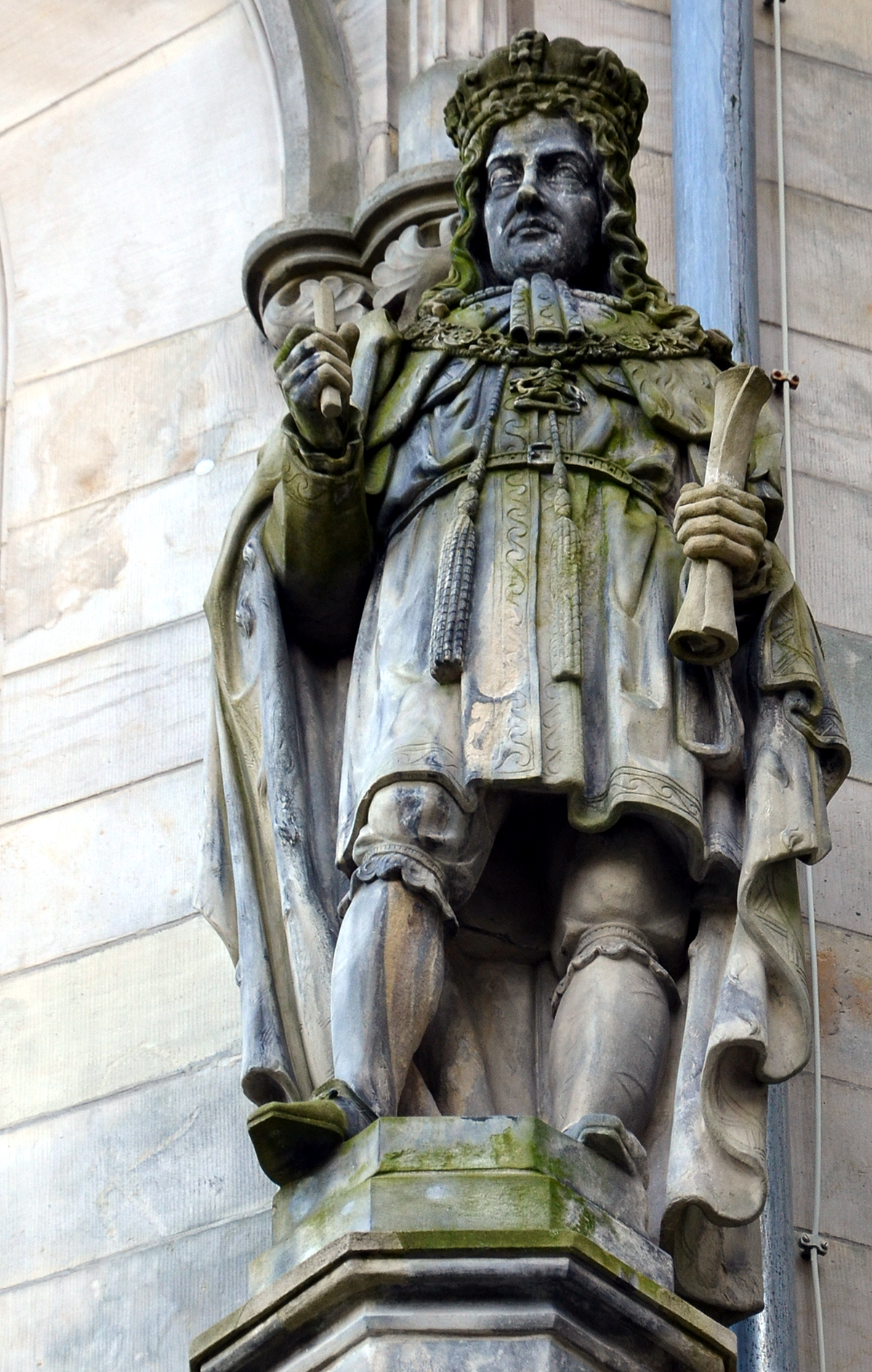
Statue of George I by Carl Rangenier in Hanover

Writers of the nineteenth century, such as Thackeray, Walter Scott and Lord Mahon, were reliant on biased first-hand accounts published in the previous century such as Lord Hervey's memoirs, and looked back on the Jacobite cause with romantic, even sympathetic, eyes. They in turn, influenced British authors of the first half of the twentieth century such as G. K. Chesterton, who introduced further anti-German and anti-Protestant bias into the interpretation of George's reign. However, in the wake of World War II continental European archives were opened to historians of the later twentieth century and nationalistic anti-German feeling subsided. George's life and reign were re-explored by scholars such as J. M. Beattie and Ragnhild Hatton, and his character, abilities and motives re-assessed in a more generous light. For example, though he was unpopular in Britain due to his supposed inability to speak English, documents from later in his reign show that he understood, spoke and wrote English. He spoke fluent German and French, good Latin, and some Italian and Dutch. John H. Plumb noted that:

Some historians have exaggerated the king's indifference to English affairs and made his ignorance of the English language seem more important than it was. He had little difficulty in communicating with his ministers in French, and his interest in all matters affecting both foreign policy and the court was profound.

The character of George I remains elusive; he was in turn genial and affectionate to his family based on private letters written to his daughter, and then dull and awkward in public. Perhaps his own mother summed him up when "explaining to those who regarded him as cold and overserious that he could be jolly, that he took things to heart, that he felt deeply and sincerely and was more sensitive than he cared to show." Whatever his true character, he ascended a precarious throne, and either by political wisdom and guile, or through accident and indifference, he left it secure in the hands of the Hanoverians and of Parliament.

== Arms ==
As king, his arms were: Quarterly, I, Gules three lions passant guardant in pale Or (for England) impaling Or a lion rampant within a tressure flory-counter-flory Gules (for Scotland); II, Azure three fleurs-de-lis Or (for France); III, Azure a harp Or stringed Argent (for Ireland); IV, tierced per pale and per chevron (for Hanover), I Gules two lions passant guardant Or (for Brunswick), II Or a semy of hearts Gules a lion rampant Azure (for Lüneburg), III Gules a horse courant Argent (for Westphalia), overall an escutcheon Gules charged with the crown of Charlemagne Or (for the dignity of Archtreasurer of the Holy Roman Empire).

Coats of arms of George I of Great Britain

Arms of George I Louis as Elector-Designate of Hanover 1689–1708

Arms of George I Louis as Elector of Hanover 1708–1714

Coat of arms of George I as King of Great Britain 1714–1727

== Issue and mistresses ==
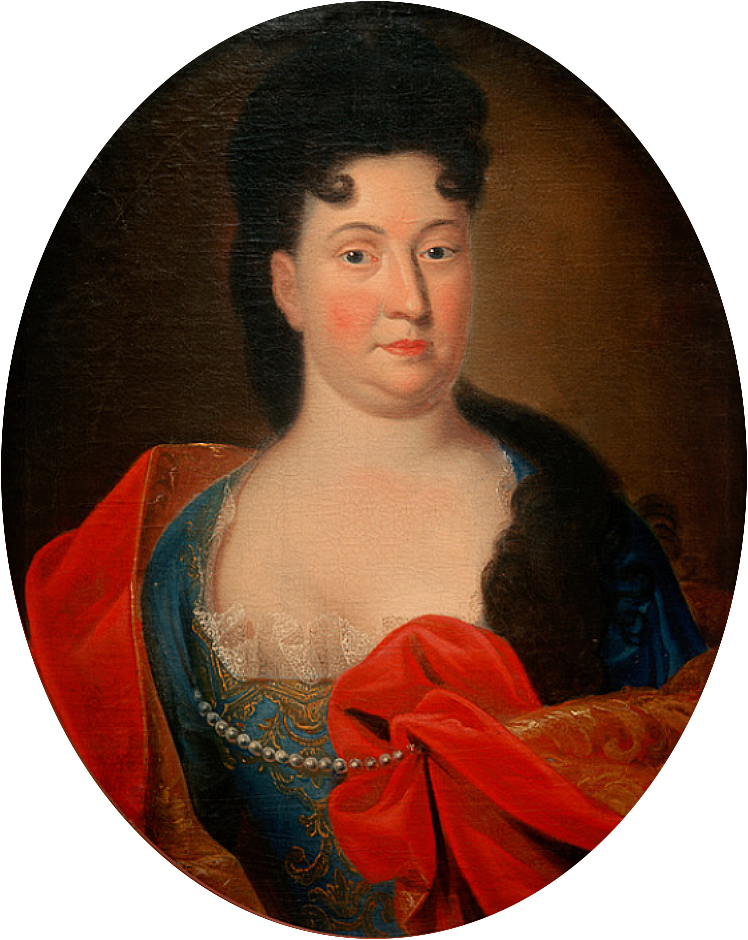
Melusine von der Schulenburg, Duchess of Kendal, George's mistress

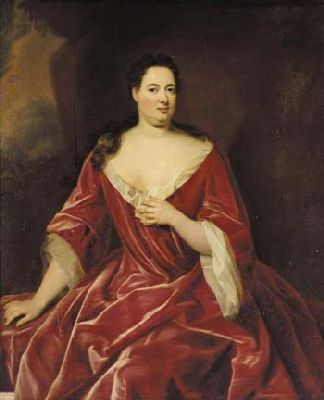
Sophia von Kielmansegg, Countess of Darlington, George's half-sister

=== Issue ===
Name	Birth	Death	Marriage
By his wife, Sophia Dorothea of Celle:
George II of Great Britain	9 November 1683	25 October 1760	Married 1705 Caroline of Ansbach; had issue
Sophia Dorothea of Hanover	26 March 1687	28 June 1757	Married 1706 Frederick William, Margrave of Brandenburg (later Frederick William I of Prussia); had issue
By his mistress, Melusine von der Schulenburg:
(Anna) Louise Sophia von der Schulenburg	January 1692	1773	Married 1707 Ernst August Philipp von dem Bussche-Ippenburg (divorced before 1714); created Countess of Delitz by Charles VI, Holy Roman Emperor, in 1722
(Petronilla) Melusina von der Schulenburg	1693	1778	Created Countess of Walsingham for life; married 1733 Philip Stanhope, 4th Earl of Chesterfield; no issue
Margarethe Gertrud von Oeynhausen	1701	1726	Married 1722 Albrecht Wolfgang, Count of Schaumburg-Lippe
Dates in this table are New Style.

=== Mistresses ===
In addition to Melusine von der Schulenburg, three other women were said to be George's mistresses:

1. Leonora von Meyseburg-Züschen, widow of a Chamberlain at the court of Hanover, and secondly married to Lieutenant-General de Weyhe. Leonore was the sister of Clara Elisabeth von Meyseburg-Züschen, Countess von Platen, who had been the mistress of George I's father, Ernest Augustus, Elector of Hanover.
2. Sophia Charlotte von Platen, later Countess of Darlington (1673 – 20 April 1725), shown by Ragnhild Hatton in 1978 to have been George's half-sister and not his mistress.
3. Baroness Sophie Caroline Eva Antoinette von Offeln (2 November 1669 – 23 January 1726), known as the "Young Countess von Platen", she married Count Ernst August von Platen, the brother of Sophia Charlotte, in 1697.

== Family tree ==
The British monarchs of the House of Stuart, their relations, and the transition to the Hanovers

James V 1512–1542 r. 1513–1542	Christian III of Denmark; 1503–1559
Mary, Queen of Scots; 1542–1587 r. 1542–1567	Frederick II of Denmark; 1534–1588	Dorothea of Denmark; 1546–1617
James VI and I 1566–1625 r. 1567/1603–1625	Anne of Denmark; 1574–1619	George, Duke of Brunswick-Calenberg; 1582–1641
Henrietta Maria of France; 1609–1669	Charles I 1600–1649 r. 1625–1649	Elizabeth Stuart, Queen of Bohemia; 1596–1662
HANOVER
Charles II; 1630–1685 r. 1660–1685	Mary, Princess Royal and Princess of Orange; 1631–1660	Anne Hyde; 1637–1671	James II and VII; 1633–1701 r. 1685–1688	Mary of Modena; 1658–1718	Sophia of Hanover; 1630–1714	Ernest Augustus, Elector of Hanover; 1629–1698
James Scott, Duke of Monmouth (illegitimate); 1649–1685	William III; 1650–1702 r. 1689–1702	Mary II; 1662–1694 r. 1689–1694	Anne; 1665–1714 r. 1702–1714	James Francis Edward Stuart "the Old Pretender"; 1688–1766	Louisa Maria Stuart; 1692–1712	George I 1660–1727 r. 1714–1727
(no children)	Prince William, Duke of Gloucester; 1689–1700	Charles Edward Stuart "the Young Pretender"; 1720–1788	Henry Benedict Stuart "Cardinal Duke of York"; 1725–1807	George II; 1683–1760 r. 1727–1760

== Notes ==
George I of Great Britain House of Hanover Cadet branch of the House of Welf Born: 28 May 1660 Died: 11 June 1727
Regnal titles
Preceded by Ernest Augustus	Duke of Brunswick-Lüneburg (Calenberg); Elector-designate of Hanover; 23 January 1698 – 28 August 1705	Inherited Brunswick-Lüneburg-Celle
Preceded by Himself as Duke of Brunswick-Lüneburg (Calenberg); George William as Duke of Brunswick-Lüneburg-Celle	Duke of Brunswick-Lüneburg; Elector-designate of Hanover; 28 August 1705 – 7 September 1708	Title of elector recognised
New title	Elector of Hanover; 7 September 1708 – 11 June 1727	Succeeded by George II
Preceded by Anne	King of Great Britain and Ireland; 1 August 1714 – 11 June 1727	Succeeded by George II
