= Charles Jean-Baptiste Fleuriau =

French statesman

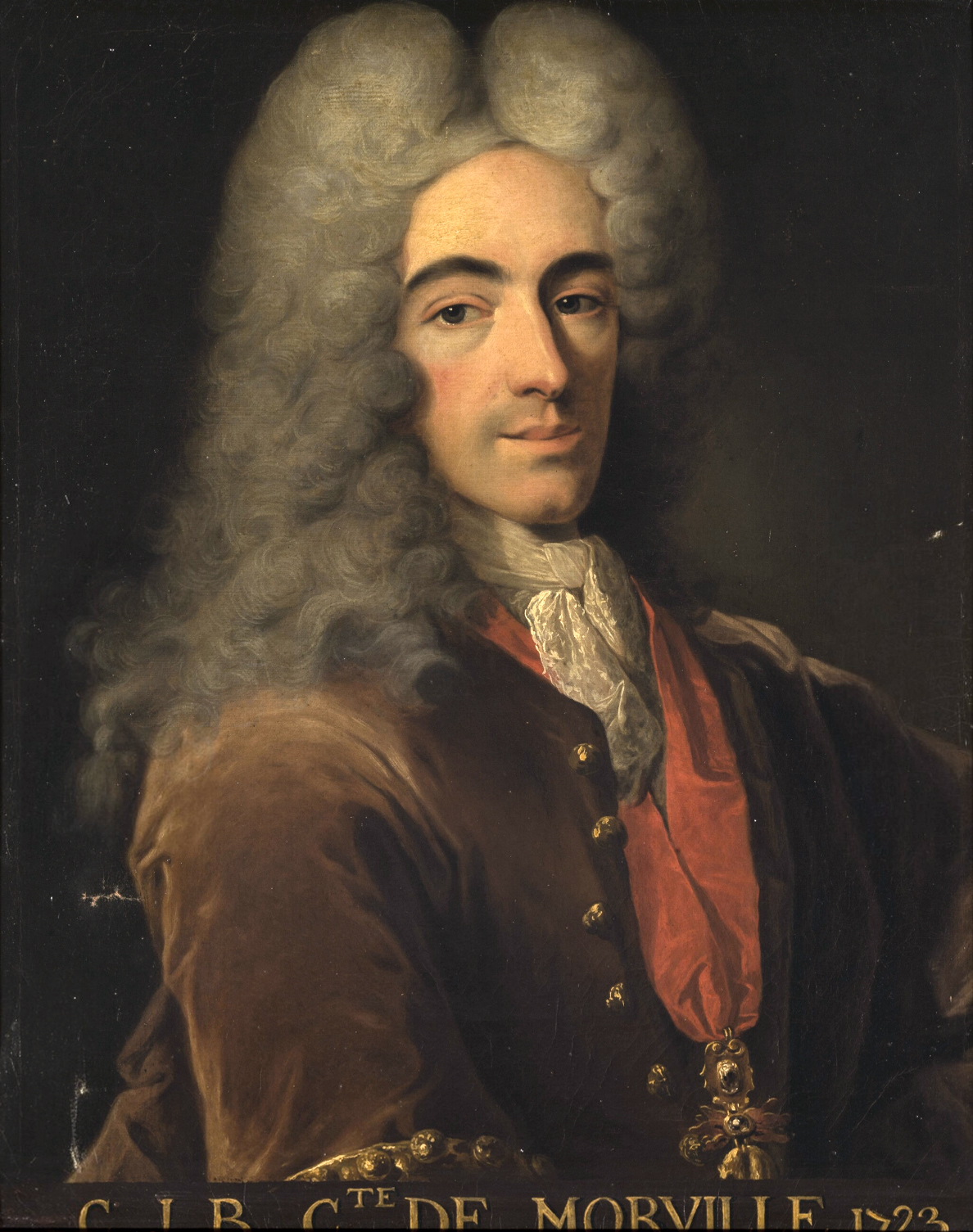
Charles Jean-Baptiste Fleuriau, comte de Morville

Charles Jean-Baptiste Fleuriau, comte de Morville (30 October 1686, in Paris – 2 February 1732) was a French statesman.

Son of Joseph Fleuriau d'Armenonville, he was ambassador to Holland, then Secretary of State for the Navy from 28 February 1722 to 16 August 1723.

When cardinal Dubois entered his death throes, the duke of Orléans sent Fleuriau de Morville to Versailles to lay hands on Dubois's papers and, in reward, named him Secretary of State for Foreign Affairs on 16 August 1723. He represented the King of France at the Congres de Cambrai in 1724, and remained in this post until 19 August 1727.
