= Mère Cardine =

French brothel madam

Mère Cardine ("Mother Cardine"), was a French brothel madam. She waged a legal battle against the royal decree that closed the brothel district in Paris in 1560, thereby delaying the decree's implementation for six years. Both in her own time and long thereafter, she appeared in pamphlets and satirical literature as the archetype of a brothel madam.

== Life and career ==
Mère Cardine was known as the "Governess of Hueleu": she managed a brothel business that is reported to have included not one but several houses in the brothel quarter of Paris on the streets Grand-Hurleur and Petit-Hurleur. These streets were called Heuleu or Hue-leu, which was possibly because the clients seen going there were mocked.

=== The 1560 Ordinance ===
Prostitution was formally banned in France in 1254. In practice, it was tolerated within the army as well as just outside of the city gates. In Paris, a brothel distinct had formed by the 1367 ordinance, which limited it (thereby allowing it) to a special part of the city. In 1560, a royal ordinance abolished the prostitution district in Paris.

Mère Cardine opposed the decree and launched a long legal process that lasted for six years. She was evidently rich, since she was able to fund such a long legal process, and when she was finally personally convicted in the legal court of Châtelet, she had contacts that prevented the verdict from being effectuated. Many other brothel keepers and owners of houses that kept brothels, drected petitions to the civil lieuntenant of Châtelet, the Prost of Paris and to the king himself.

In a letter patent of the 12 February 1566, the king finally ordered the city court to proceed with the verdict and implement it without further delay. The verdict was made public by the cty trumpeteers at the entry to the two streets of Heuleu, giving the prostitutes one day to evacuate the buildings. There were to be no more legal brothels in Paris again until the introduction of the regulated prostitution in 1804, though in reality by the 18th century, the ban was no longer implemented.

== Aftermath ==
Mère Cardine was a well known figure in French satire and pamphlets about prostitution and its consequences, such as venereal illnesses and human trafficking, both during her own lifetime and for decades afterward, and described as the Queen of Hell and compared to Cerberus. She was long used in literature as the typical brothel madam in Paris.
