= Uxelles =

- Commune
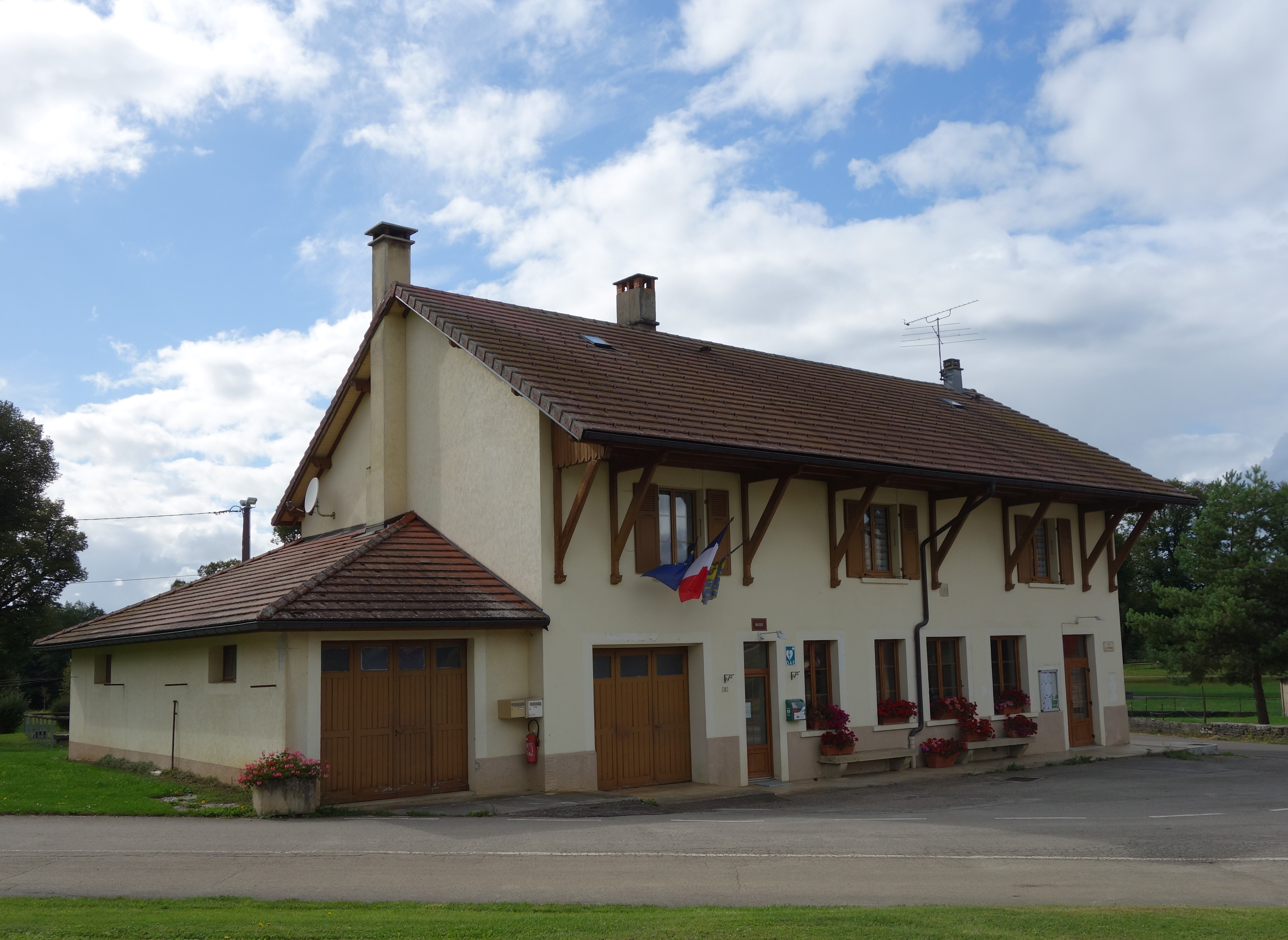
- The town hall in Uxelles
- Location of Uxelles
- Location within France Location within Bourgogne-Franche-Comté
- Coordinates: 46°36′11″N 5°47′32″E
- Country: France
- Region: Bourgogne-Franche-Comté
- Department: Jura
- Arrondissement: Lons-le-Saunier
- Canton: Saint-Laurent-en-Grandvaux

Government
  - Mayor (2020–2026): François Bailly
- Area^{1}: 5.27 km^{2} (2.03 sq mi)
- Highest elevation: 686 m (2,251 ft)
- Lowest elevation: 570 m (1,870 ft)
- Population (2023): 63
  - Density: 12/km^{2} (31/sq mi)
- Time zone: UTC+01:00 (CET)
  - Summer (DST): UTC+02:00 (CEST)
- INSEE/Postal code: 39538 /39130
- ^{1} French Land Register data, which excludes lakes, ponds, glaciers > 1 km^{2} (0.386 sq mi or 247 acres) and river estuaries.

Uxelles (French pronunciation: [yksɛl]) is a commune in the Jura department in the Bourgogne-Franche-Comté region in eastern France.

== Population ==
Historical population
Year	Pop.	±% p.a.
1968	47	—
1975	35	−4.12%
1982	47	+4.30%
1990	44	−0.82%
1999	39	−1.33%
2007	55	+4.39%
2012	46	−3.51%
2017	55	+3.64%
2023	63	+2.29%
Source: INSEE

== See also ==
- Communes of the Jura department
