= Cellamare conspiracy =

The Cellamare conspiracy of 1718 (French: Conspiration de Cellamare) was a conspiracy against the Regent of France, Philippe d'Orléans (1674–1723) that aimed to depose him of his position and place Philip V of Spain as the new regent of France. Concocted in Spain, the plot was the brainchild of Antonio del Giudice, Prince of Cellamare.

== Background and plot ==
Antonio del Giudice was named the Spanish Ambassador to the French Court in 1715 during the reign of King Louis XIV; Louis XIV died in September that year and his successor, Louis XV, aged five, was put under the care of the Duke of Orléans who was a nephew (as well as son-in-law) of the late Louis XIV. Antonio del Giudice went to France during the Regency of Philippe d'Orléans.

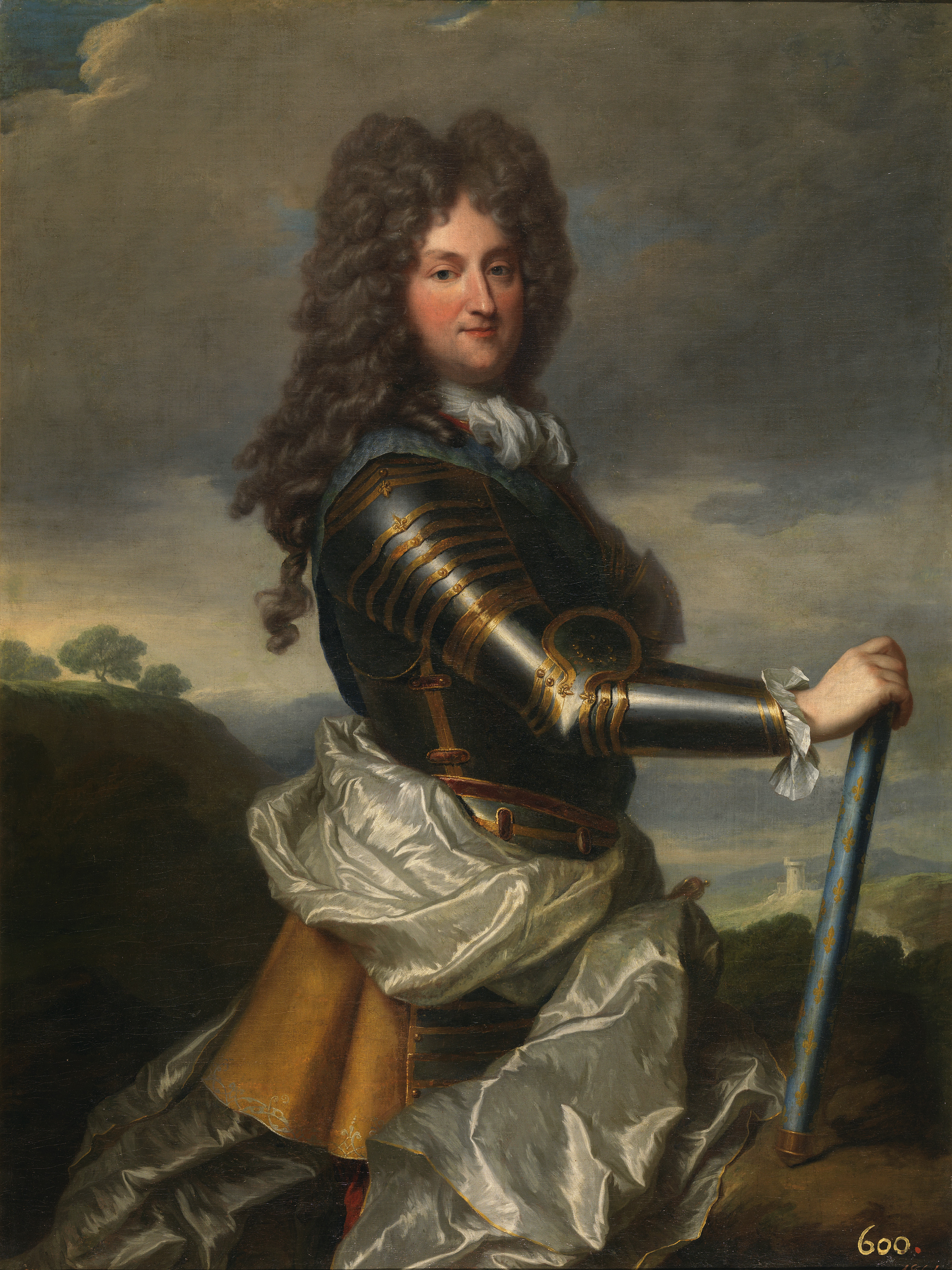
Philippe d'Orléans, against whom the plot was directed

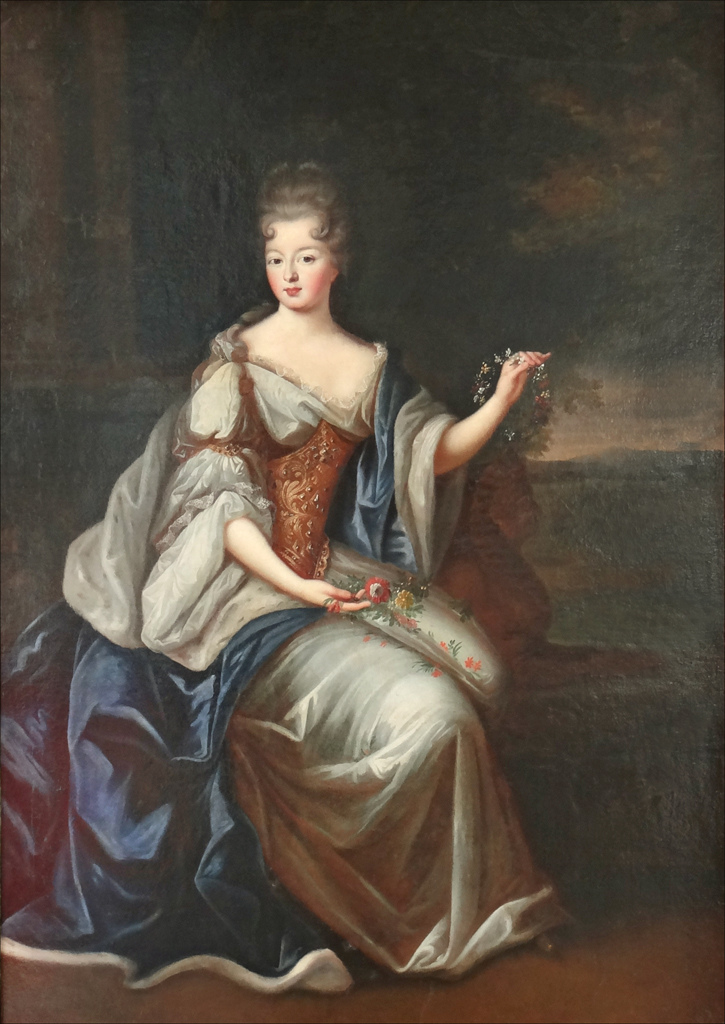
Madame du Maine, a ringleader of the plot

At the instigation of Guillaume Dubois, the Secretary of State for Foreign Affairs, France formed the Quadruple Alliance with Great Britain, the Netherlands, and the Holy Roman Empire to oppose the possible personal union between France and Spain, should the five-year-old Louis XV die. Spain was then ruled by Louis XV's uncle, Philip V of Spain, who had been king of Spain since the death of Charles II in 1700. The War of the Spanish Succession had resulted in the Treaty of Utrecht of April 1713; that treaty underlined that neither Philip nor his descendants could inherit the French throne, he having agreed to this previously.

The Prince of Cellamare and his embassy wanted to depose Philippe d'Orléans and make Philip V the Regent for his nephew. The plan was greatly supported by some of Philippe d'Orléans's most notorious enemies, namely Louis Auguste, Duke of Maine and his wife, Louise Bénédicte de Bourbon. Louise had entered into correspondence with Spanish Prime Minister Giulio Alberoni, a favourite of Spanish Queen Elisabeth Farnese, and was trying to place her husband on the throne.

With the support of the Spanish ambassador, a plot to carry out the transferral was soon woven into the entourage of the duchess. According to the memoirs of the duchess's lady-in-waiting, Baroness de Staal, Melchior de Polignac and the Duke of Richelieu were part of the plot.

The Duke of Richelieu was then having a romantic affair with one of the Regent's daughters, Charlotte Aglaé d'Orléans. The baroness's memoirs said that the duke and duchess of Maine had wanted to call a meeting of the États généraux on the matter.

The correspondence between the duchess of Maine and Alberoni was later intercepted by the police after information from Madeleine Fillon, and so was reported to the regent who acted swiftly; on 9 December, the Prince of Cellamare was arrested and sent back to Spain; Alberoni was arrested on 5 December 1718 at Poitiers. The duchess was exiled to Dijon while her husband was imprisoned in the fortress of Doullens in Picardy. The Duke of Richelieu was imprisoned in the Bastille where he was later visited by his lover, Charlotte Aglaé d'Orléans, dressed in disguise.

However, the guilty members of the plot were all pardoned by 1720 and allowed to return to their residences.

On 9 January 1719, France declared war on Spain, following in the footsteps of Great Britain who had done so a couple of weeks earlier, on 27 December 1718.

Two years later, the aims of the Cellamare conspiracy were revived in the Pontcallec conspiracy, four leaders of which were executed.

== Sources ==
- The current information was taken from the present Conspiration de Cellamare on French Wikipedia.
